= Angeln =

Peninsula on the Baltic coast of Jutland

Coordinates: 54°40′N 9°40′E

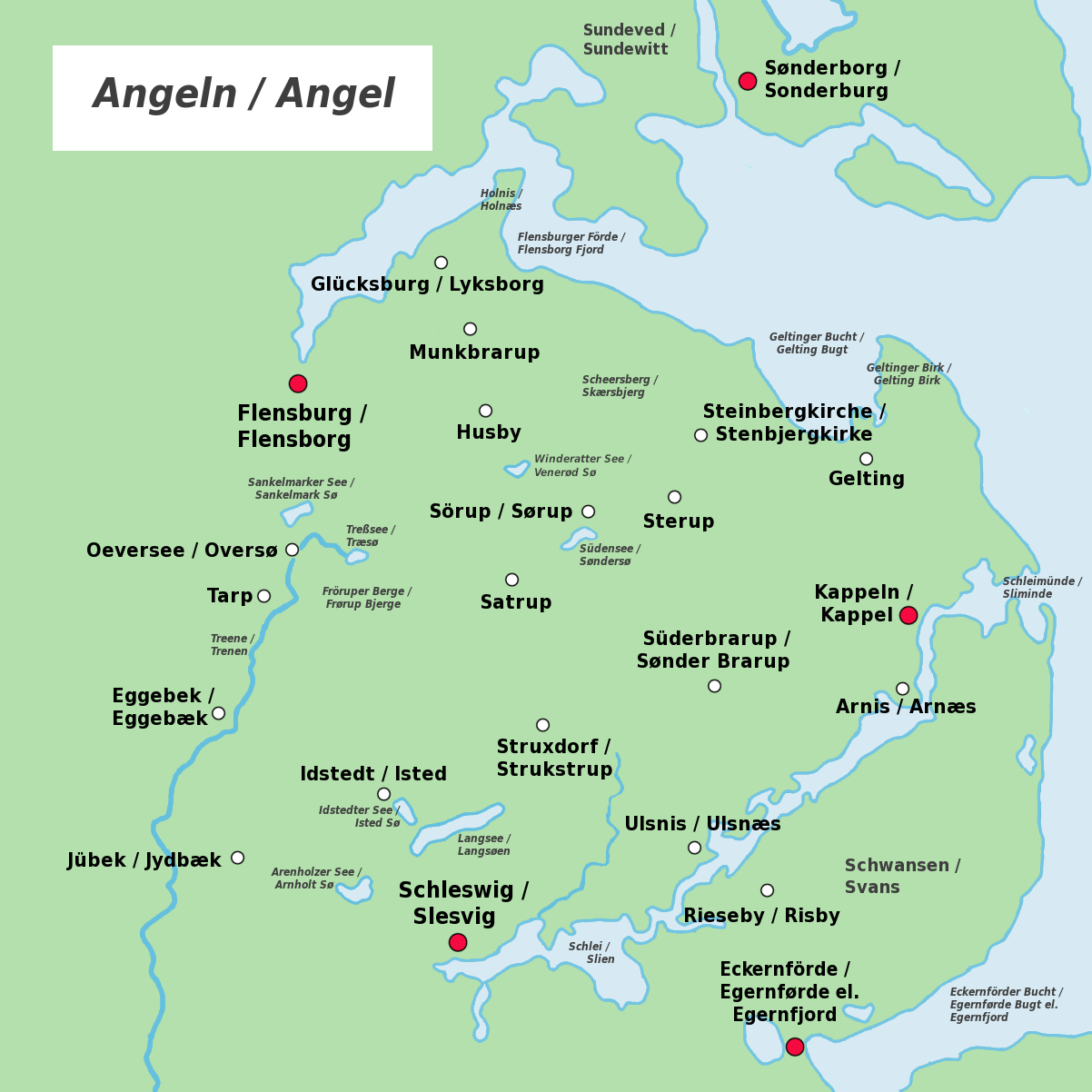
Bilingual map of Angeln

Angeln (pronounced [ˈaŋl̩n]; Danish: Angel) is a peninsula on the eastern coast of Jutland, in the Bay of Kiel. It forms part of Southern Schleswig, the northernmost region of Germany. The peninsula is bounded on the north by the Flensburg Firth, which separates it from Sundeved and the island of Als in Denmark, and on the south by the Schlei, which separates it from Schwansen. The landscape is hilly, dotted with numerous lakes. The largest towns are Flensburg, Schleswig and Kappeln.

Angeln is notable for being the putative home of the Angles, a Germanic tribe that migrated to Great Britain during the Age of Migrations and founded the kingdoms of Mercia, Northumbria and East Anglia. The Angles would ultimately give their name to England.

Glücksburg Castle in Glücksburg and Gottorf Castle in Schleswig were the original seats of two historically important dynasties, the House of Glücksburg and the House of Holstein-Gottorp.

== Etymology ==
The place-name is first attested in Widsith, an Old English poem dating to the 6th or 7th century. It has been linked to the Germanic roots *angulaz ("hook") and *angw- ("narrow"), and may have originated as a name for the Schlei. It is unclear whether the ancient Angeln corresponded to the region now denoted by the name or whether it was of greater extent.

== Geography ==
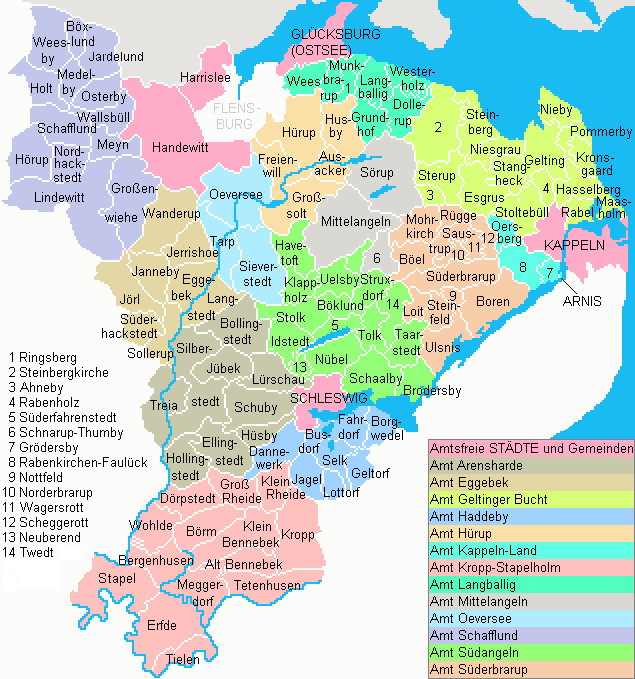
District of Schleswig-Flensburg

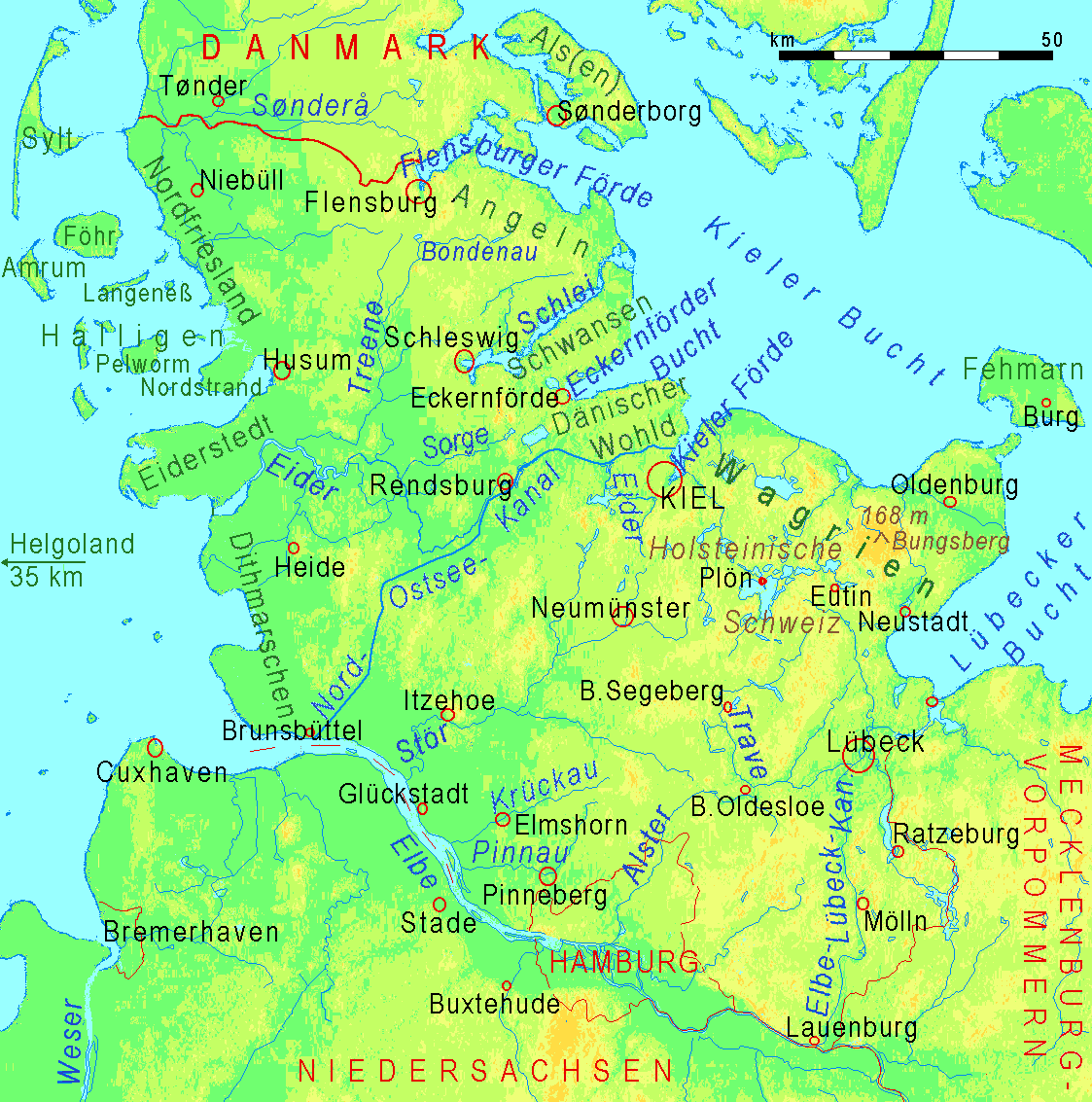
Physical map of Schleswig-Holstein, Angeln in the northeast

Angeln is one of four peninsulas lining the Baltic coast of Schleswig-Holstein, along with Schwansen, Dänischer Wohld and Wagria. These peninsulas are all part of the Schleswig-Holstein Morainic Uplands (Ger. Schleswig-Holsteinisches Moränenhügelland), that were formed during the Weichselian glaciation, and are therefore hilly and dotted with several glacial lakes.

The Angeln lakes are subdivided into the North Angeln Lake Group (Ger. Nordangeliter Seengruppe) and the South Angeln Lake Group (Südangeliter Seengruppe). The River Treene with its main headstreams Bondenau and Kielstau rises in Angeln. Although rising on the Angeln Peninsula in the Baltic Sea, the Treene flows towards the North Sea, being the main tributary of the River Eider. The Eider is considered the historical southern border of the Danish Realm, as well as the historical border line between Danish and Low German.

The eastern part of the peninsula is called the Angeln Uplands, while the western part is called Luusangeln (de). This designation comes from the Angeln Danish word for "bright", lus (Standard Danish lys), and indicates the predominantly light colour of the widespread sand-rich podzols there. Luusangeln constitutes a transition zone from the Angeln Uplands in the east, to the Schleswig Geest west of Angeln, and its appearance resembles a landscape park. The Schleswig Geest in turn merges into the tidal marshes of North Frisia. The northernmost part of Angeln is formed by the Holnis Peninsula, which projects into the Flensburg Firth and separates the inner firth (Innenförde) from the outer firth (Außenförde).

Apart from Flensburg, which is an independent town, the Angeln Peninsula belongs to the district of Schleswig-Flensburg, Germany's northeasternmost district (seat: Schleswig). This comparatively rural district has approximately 204,761 inhabitants (as of 31 December 2023).

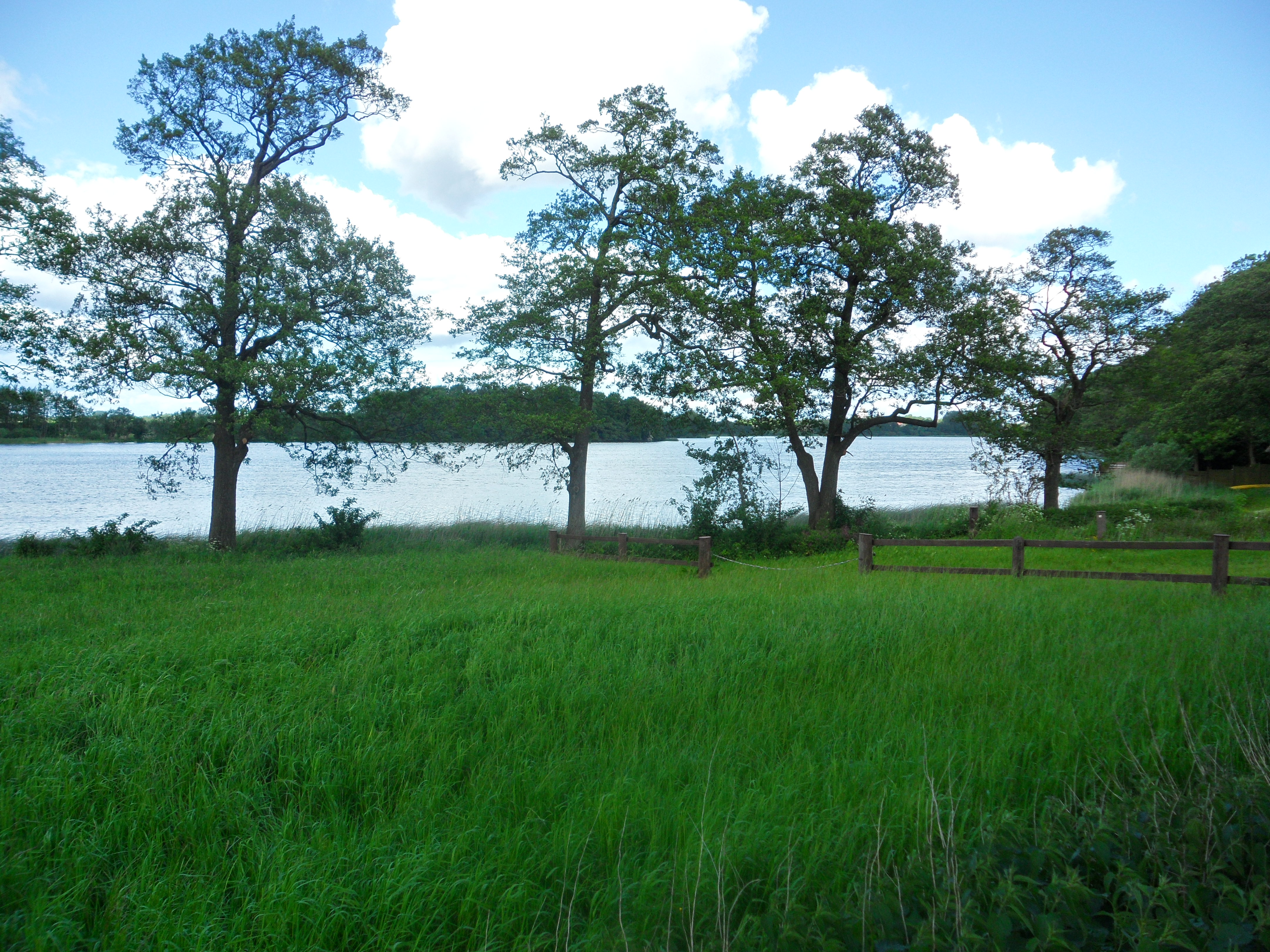
Südensee, a glacial lake in Angeln

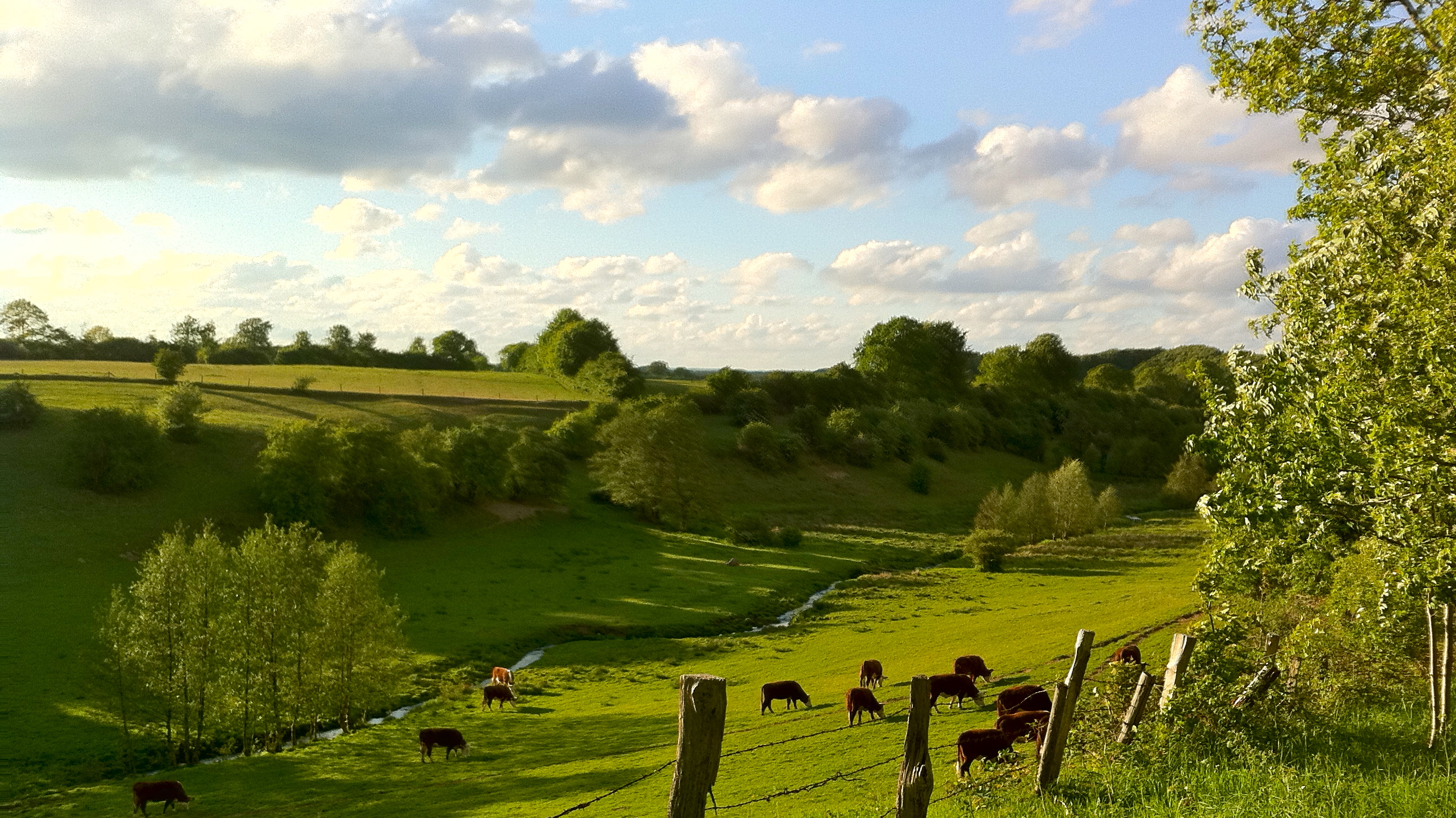
Valley of the Munkbrarupau near Munkbrarup

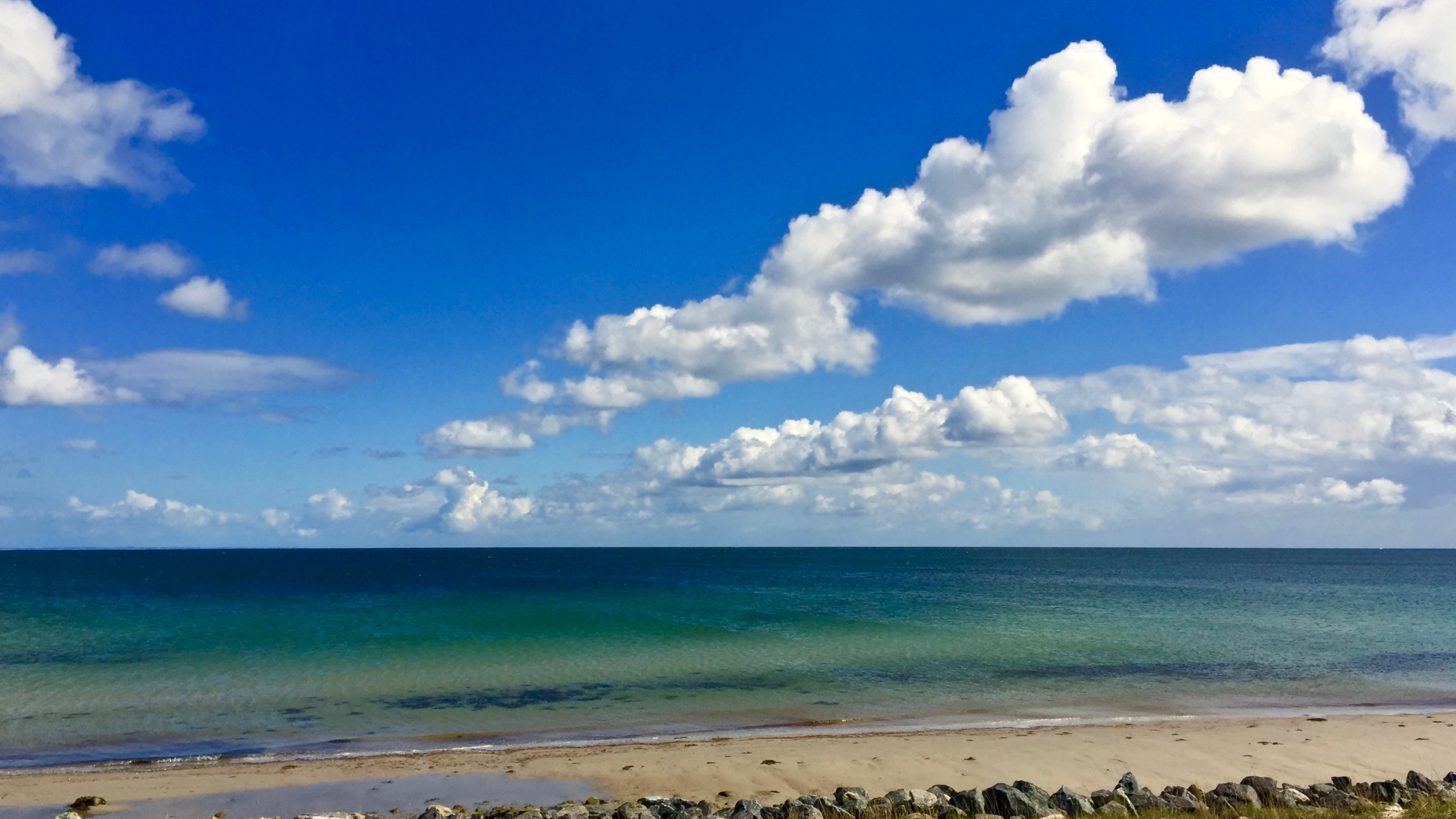
Beach of Nieby

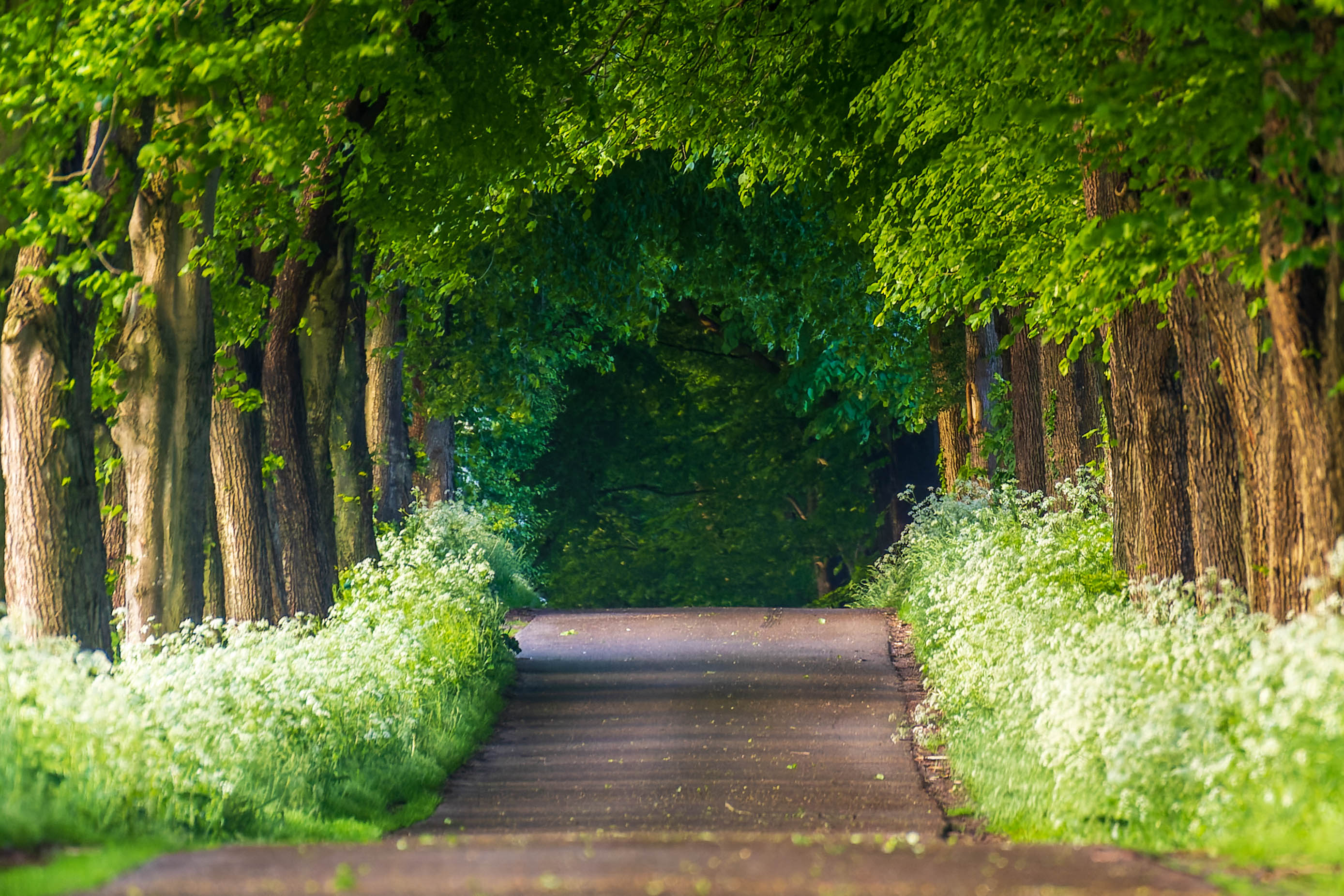
Avenue in Schaalby

=== Lakes ===
The largest North Angeln lakes are:

- Sankelmarker See (Sankelmark Sø)
- Südensee (Søndersø)
- Winderatter See (Venerød Sø)
- Treßsee (Træsø)
- Havetofter See (Havetoft Sø)
- Munkbrarupau (Brarup Å)

The largest South Angeln lakes are:

- Langsee (Schleswig) (Langsøen)
- Arenholzer See (Arnholt Sø)
- Idstedter See (Isted Sø)
- Reethsee (Rørsø)
- Bocksee (Buksø)
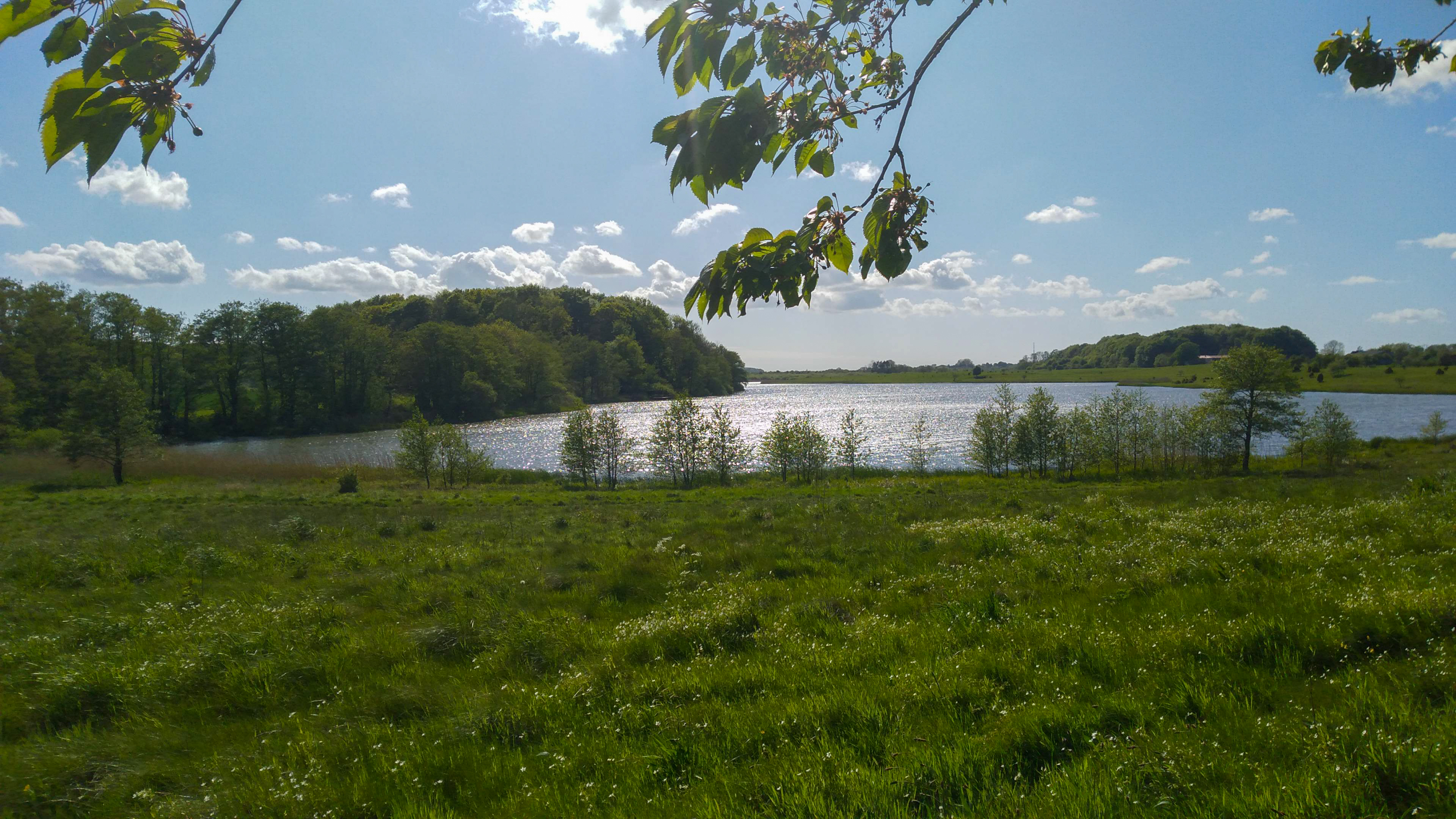
Winderatter See

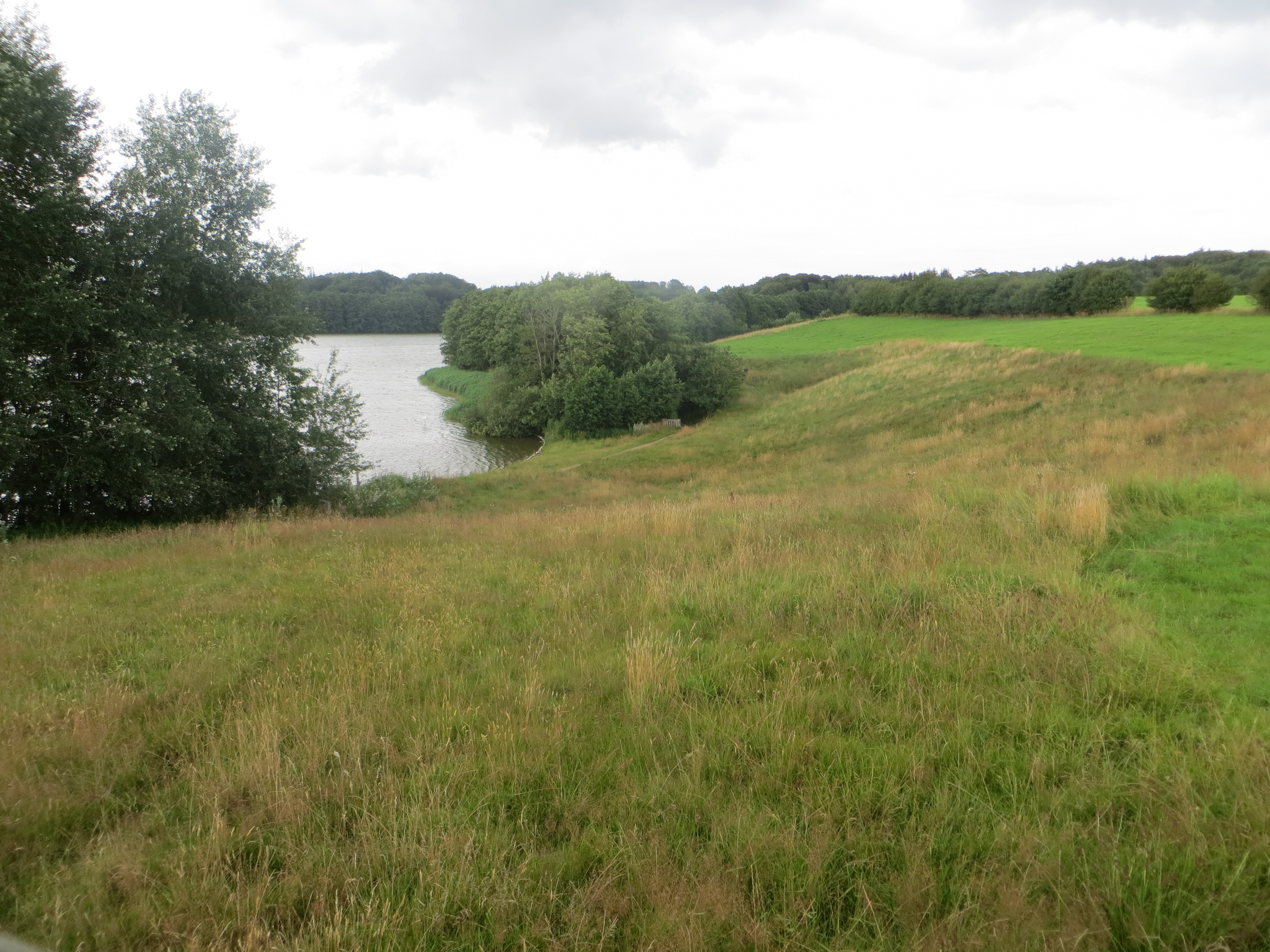
Sankelmarker See

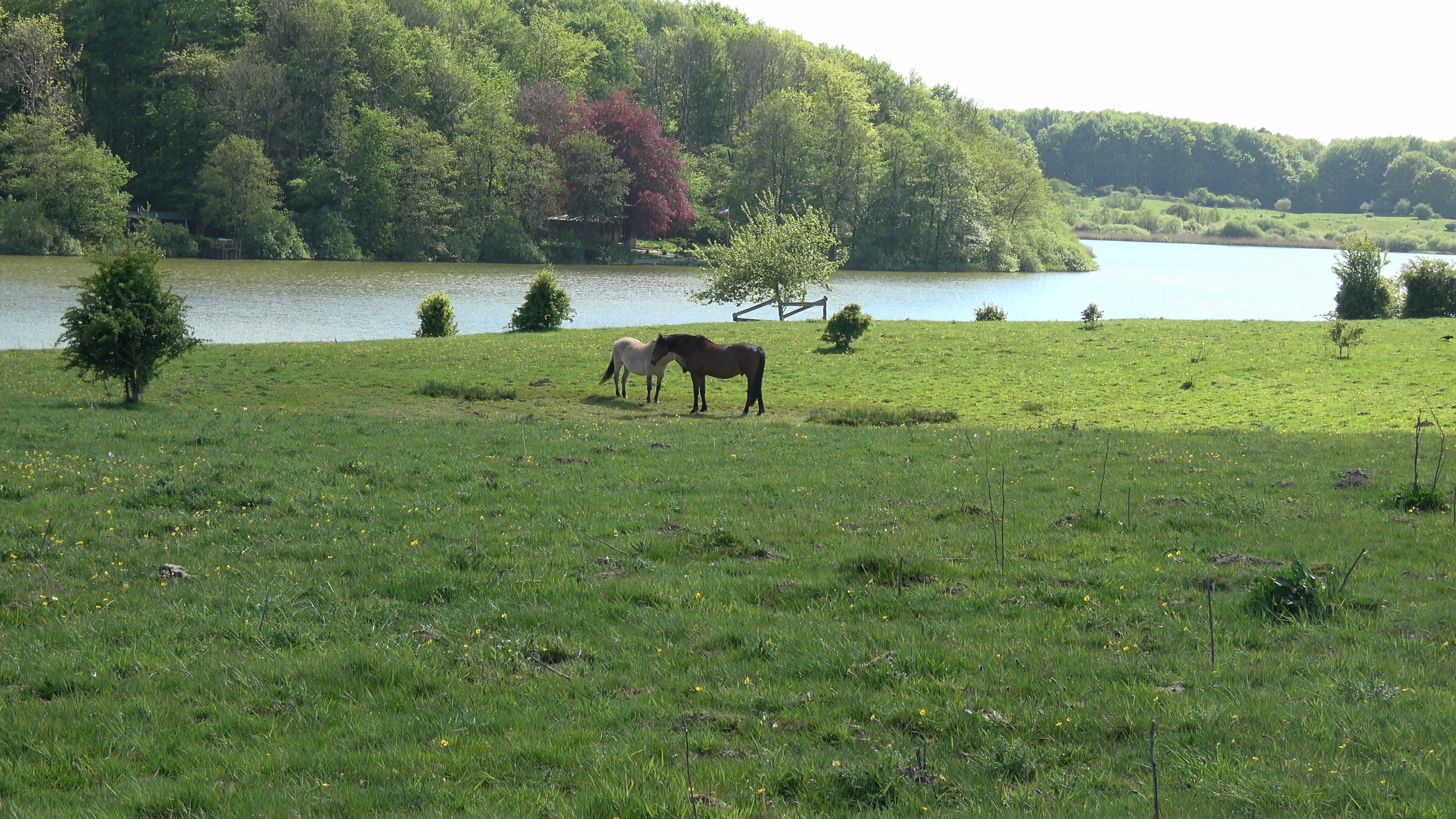
Winderatter See

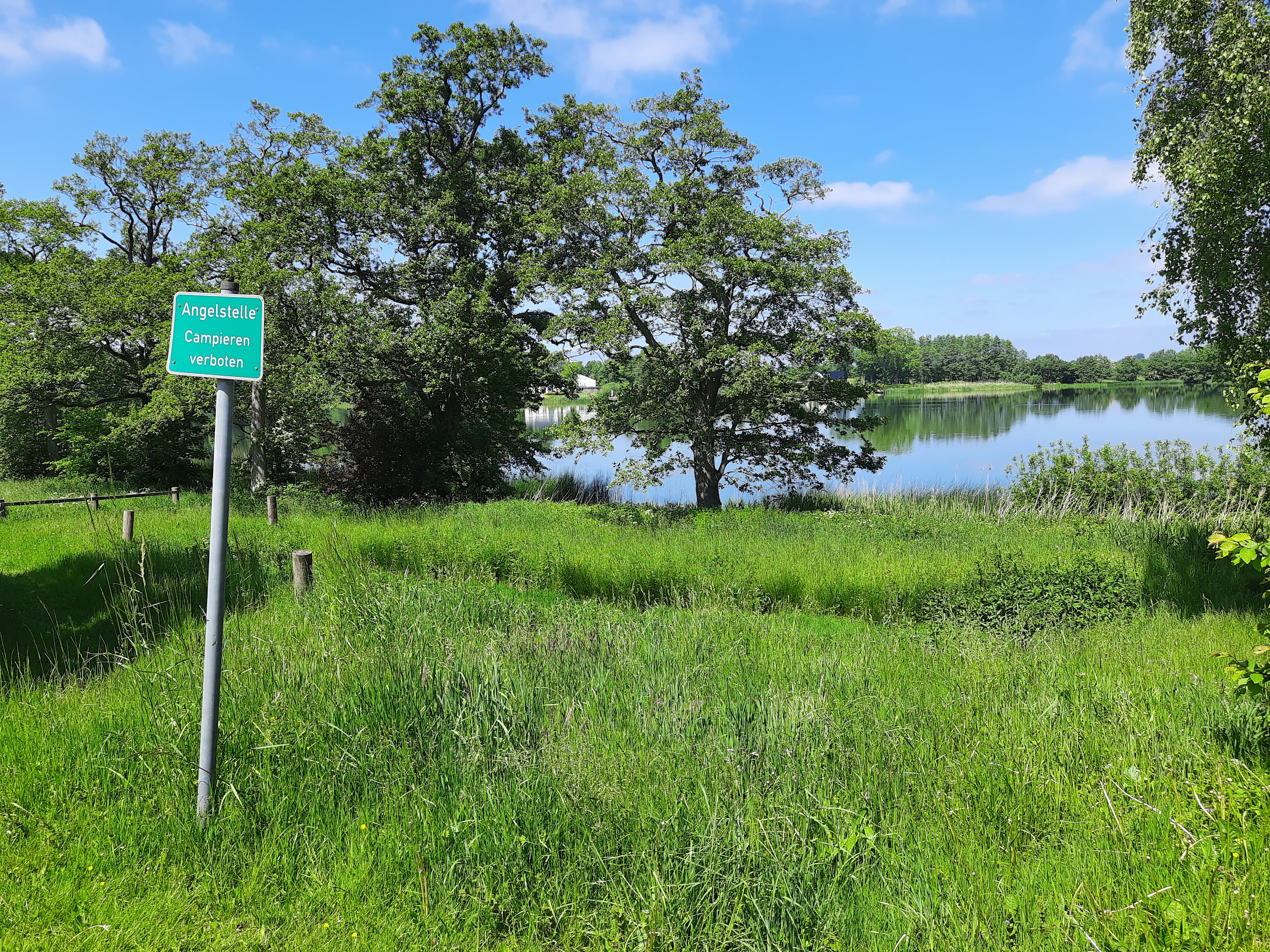
Angelstelle (angling spot) sign in Angeln (Südensee)

=== Rivers ===
The chain of hills running across Angeln between Husby and Kappeln constitutes the drainage divide between the Baltic and North Seas. East of it, small streams mostly called Auen flow towards the Baltic. West of it, most streams flow towards the Treene and later the Eider and hence into the North Sea.

The Treene is the longest tributary of the Eider, and its two headstreams, Bondenau and Kielstau, rise in and flow through Angeln. The sources of the Bondenau are in Mohrkirch and in Sörup-Sörupholz. At Mittelangeln-Bondebrück the Südensee Au joins the Bondenau. The Kielstau rises in Sörup-Schwensby, passes through the Winderatter See and flows into the Bondenau at Großsolt, just before the Bondenau enters the Treßsee. Upon leaving the lake the river takes on the name Treene and leaves Angeln to the west. It enters the Eider at Friedrichstadt, which in turn enters its extensive estuary, the Purrenstrom, at Tönning.

The largest river system that flows entirely in Angeln from its sources to its mouth is the system of the Loiter Au (also called Füsinger Au). It is formed by the confluence of the Boholzer Au (which is called Wellspanger Au in its upper course) and the Oxbek (whose upper reaches are also called Mühlenau, and whose longest tributary is the Flaruper Au), at a place called Kreuzau in Süderbrarup-Brebelholz. After the confluence, the river flows in a southerly direction, and after approximately 18 kilometers, it flows into the Kleine Breite of the Schlei at Winningmay (municipality of Schaalby), east of Schleswig.

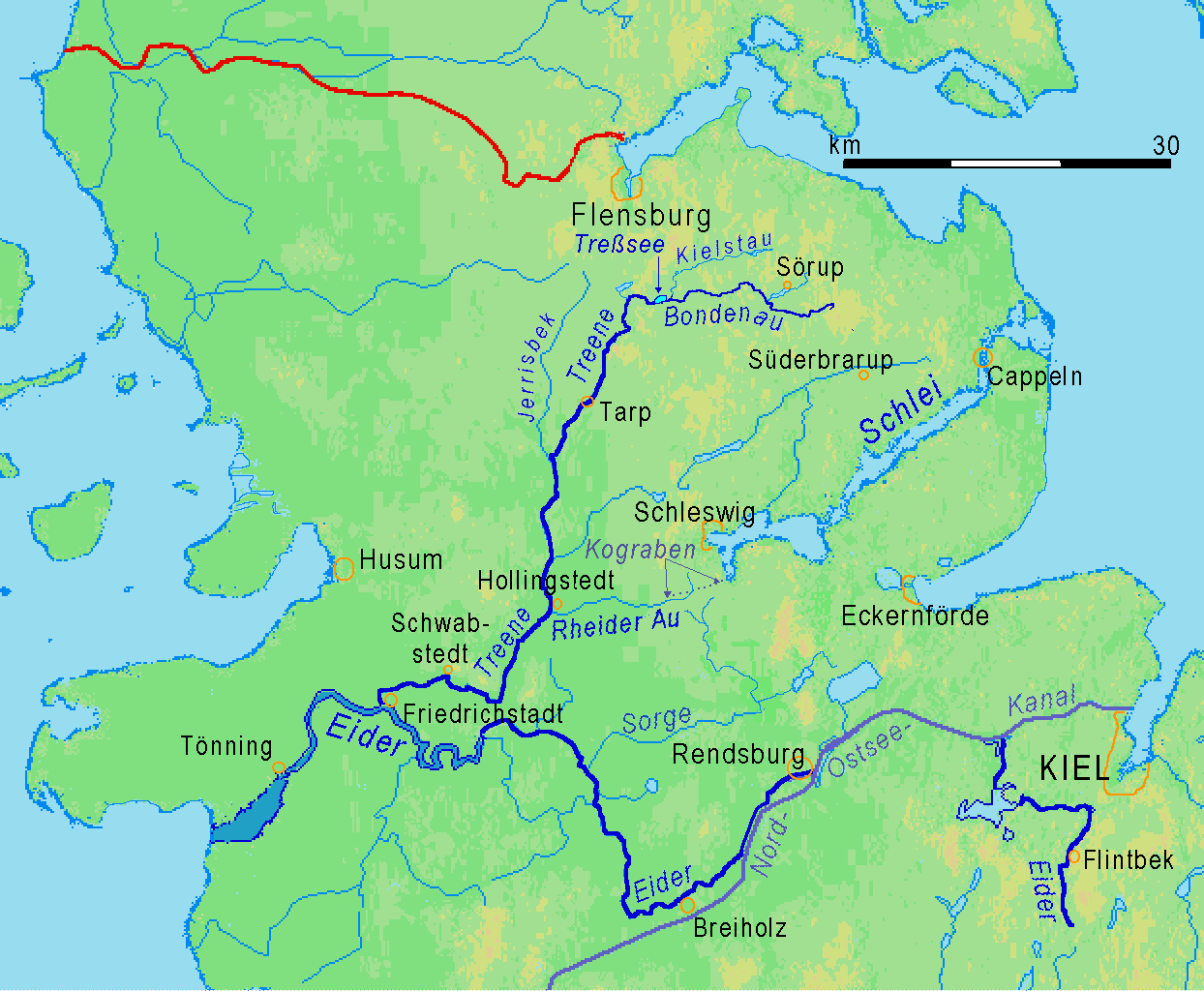
Map of the longest rivers in northern Schleswig-Holstein

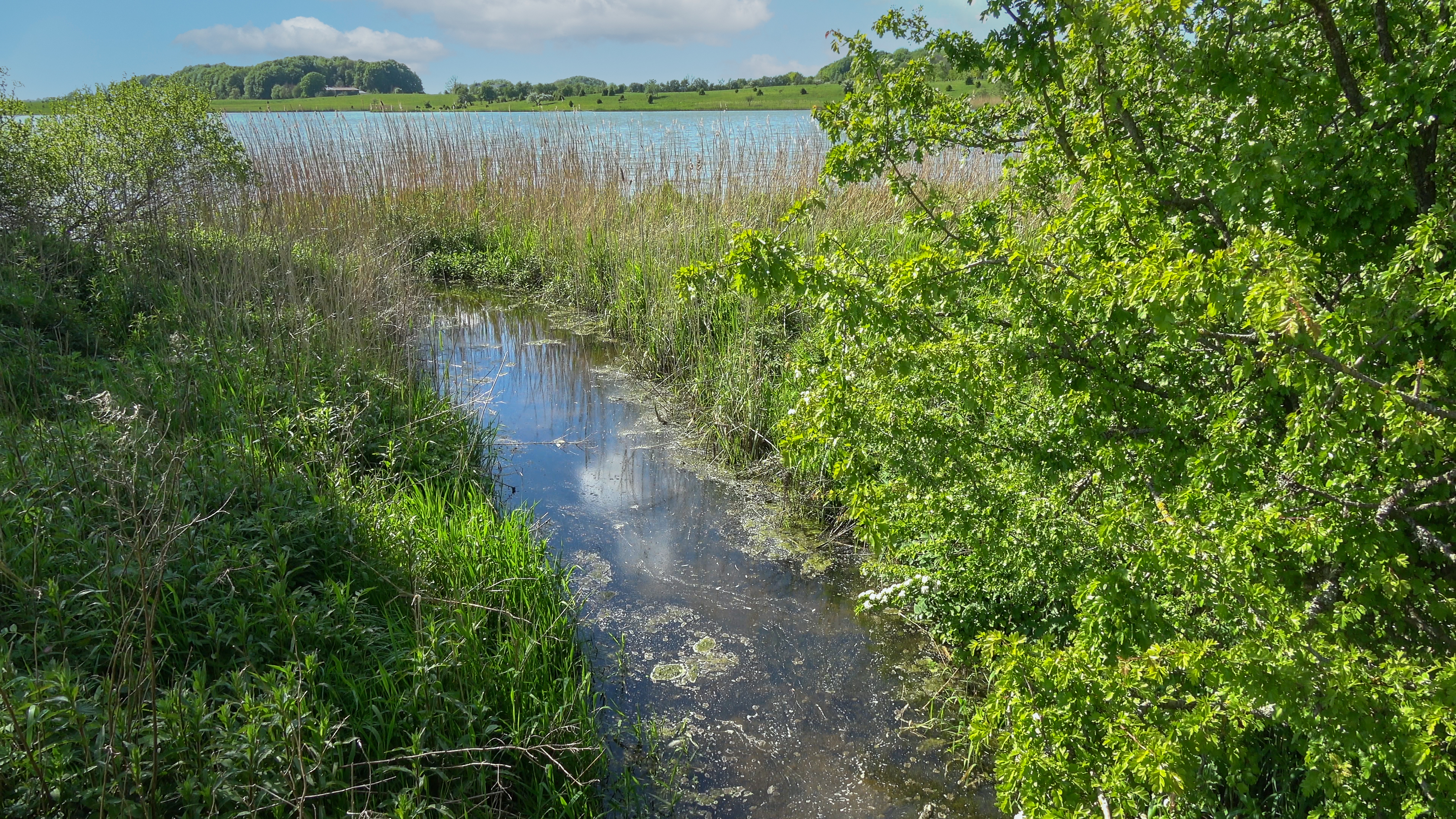
The Kielstau entering the Winderatter See

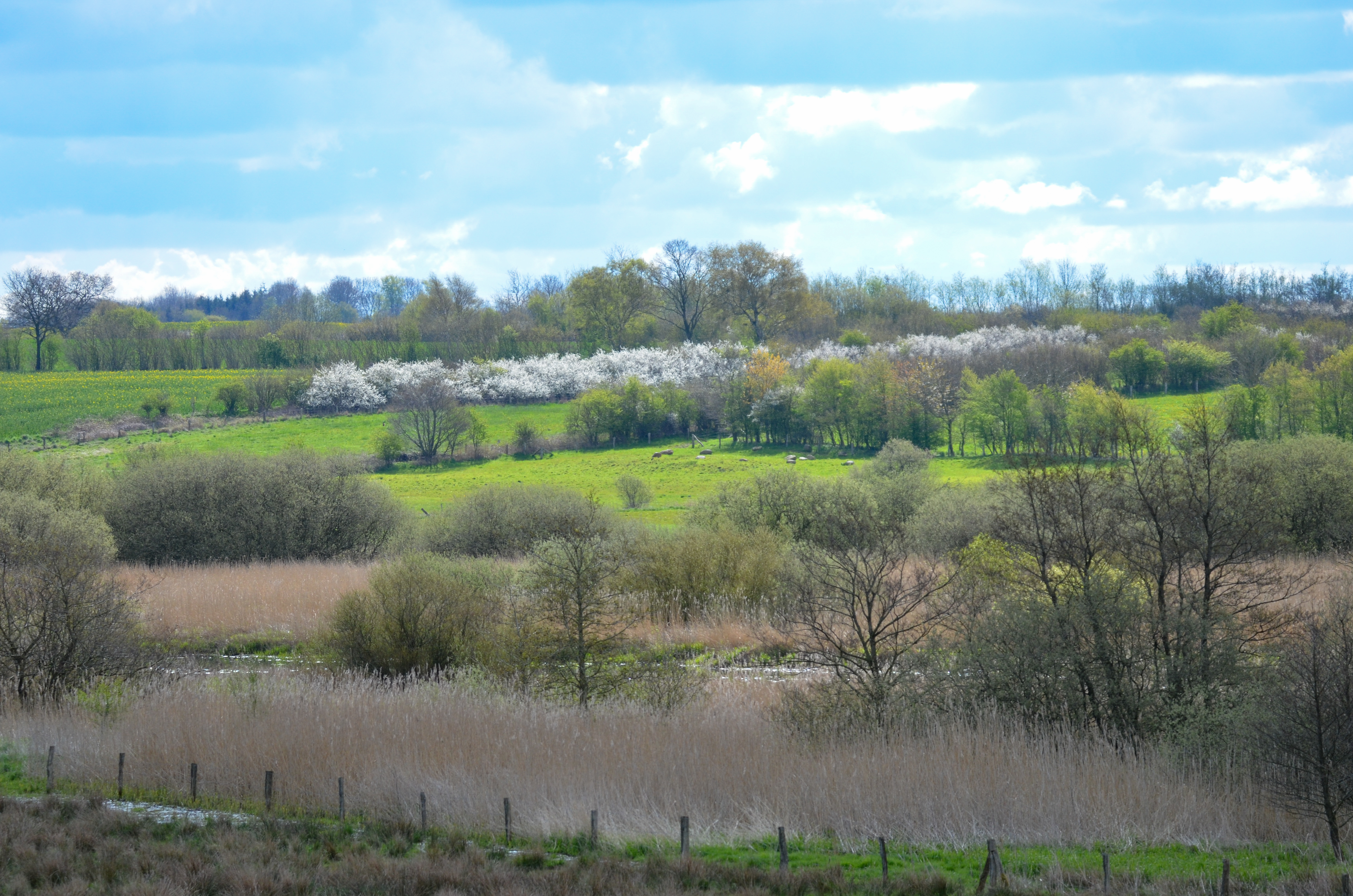
The Treene valley just west of the Treßsee

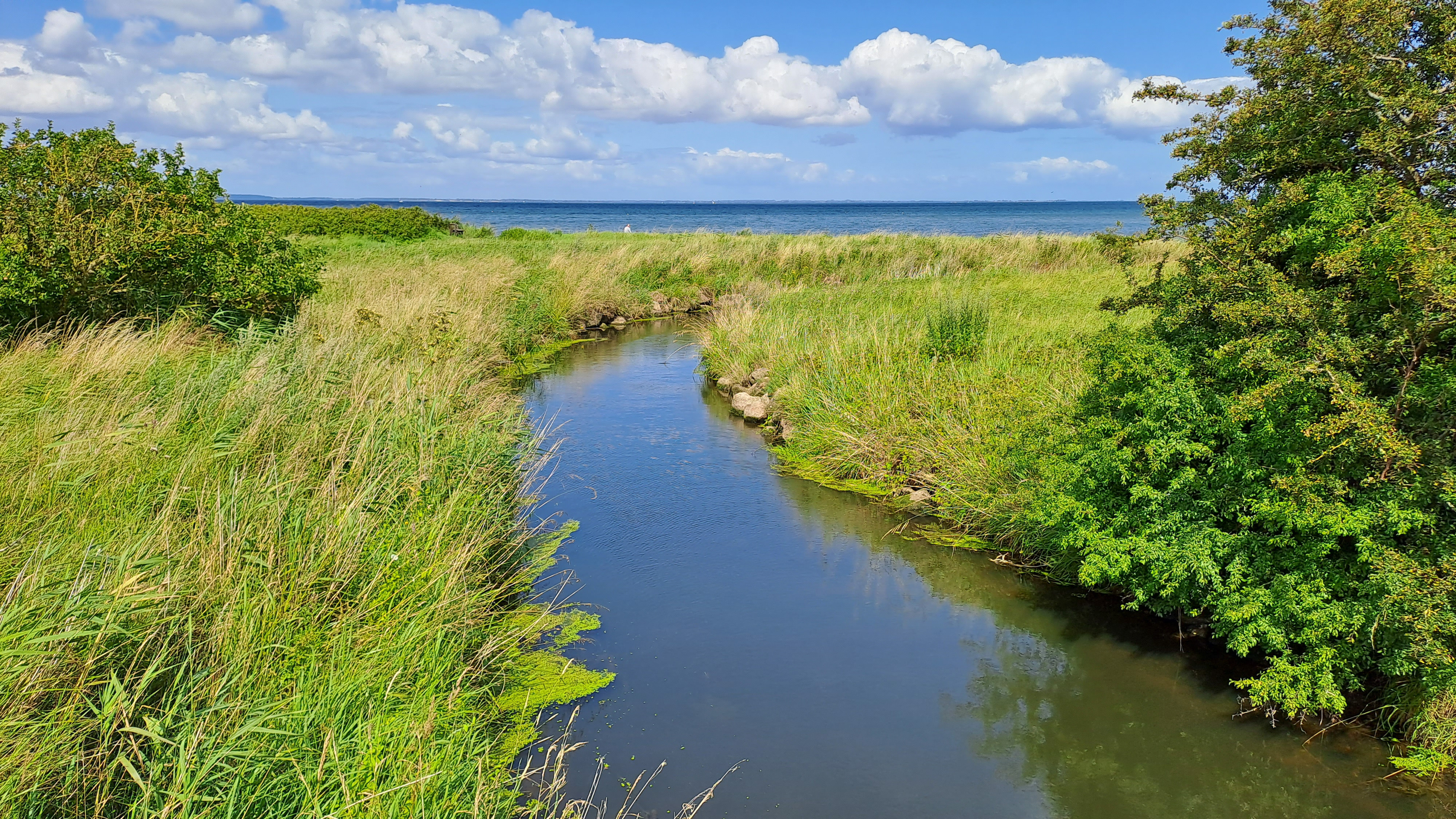
The Lippingau flowing towards the Baltic

=== Nature reserves ===
There are 10 officially designated nature reserves (Naturschutzgebiete) in Angeln:

- Geltinger Birk (Gelting Birk)
- Holnis (Holnæs)
- Hechtmoor (Hegemose)
- Höftland Bockholmwik und angrenzende Steilküsten (Höftland Bockholmwick and adjacent steep coasts)
- Obere Treenelandschaft (Upper Treene Landscape)
- Os bei Süderbrarup (Sønderbrarup Ås) (Esker near Süderbrarup)
- Pugumer See und Umgebung (Pugum Sø) (Pugumer See and surroundings)
- Reesholm/Schlei
- Tal der Langballigau (valley of the Langballigau)
- Schleimünde (Sliminde) (mouth of the Schlei)

There is also one nature park, Naturpark Schlei. The Haithabu-Dannewerk nature reserve lies just southwest of Angeln. It stretches along the Danevirke and around the Viking settlement of Hedeby, which constitute a UNESCO World Heritage Site.

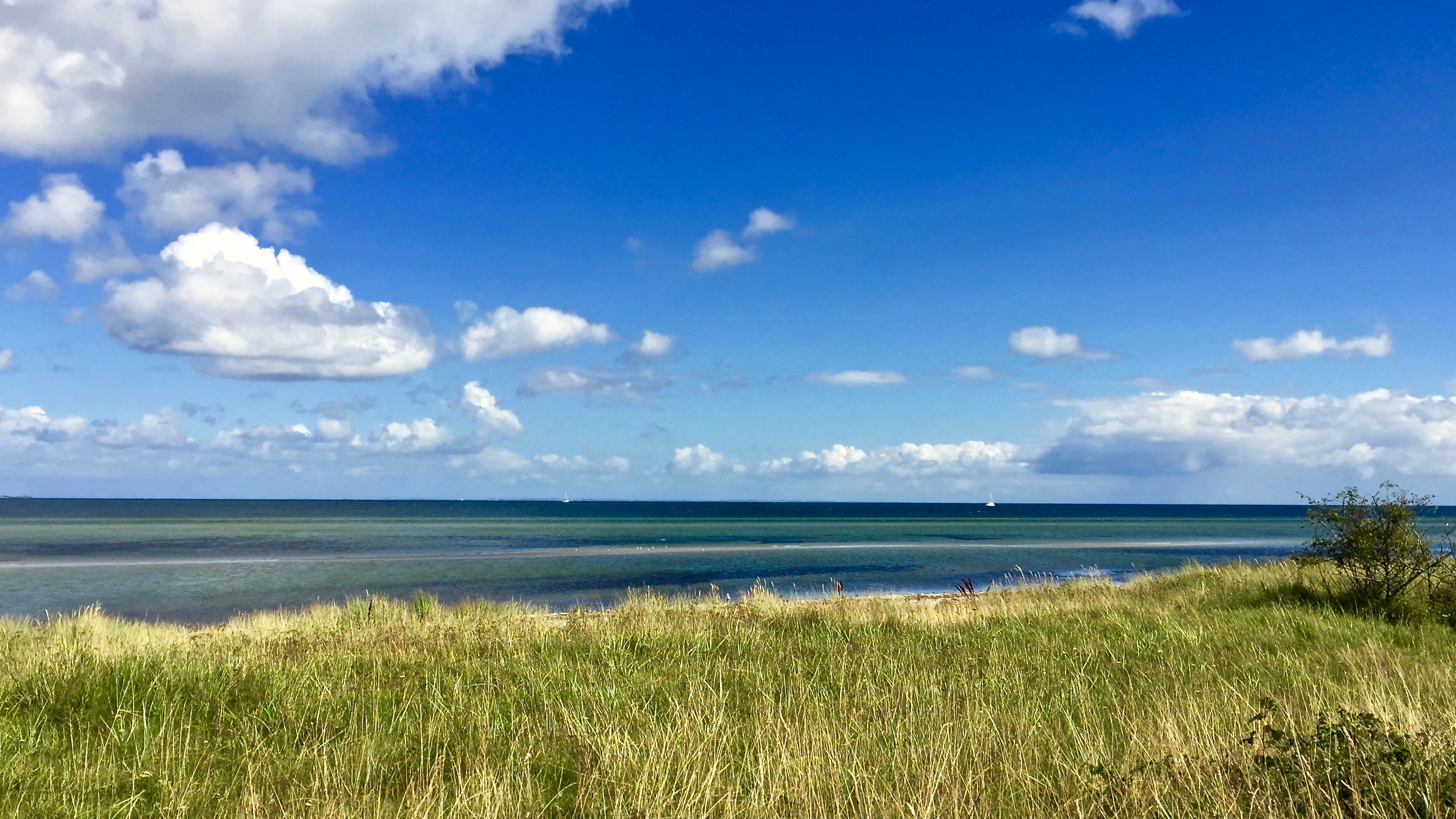
Coast of the Geltinger Birk

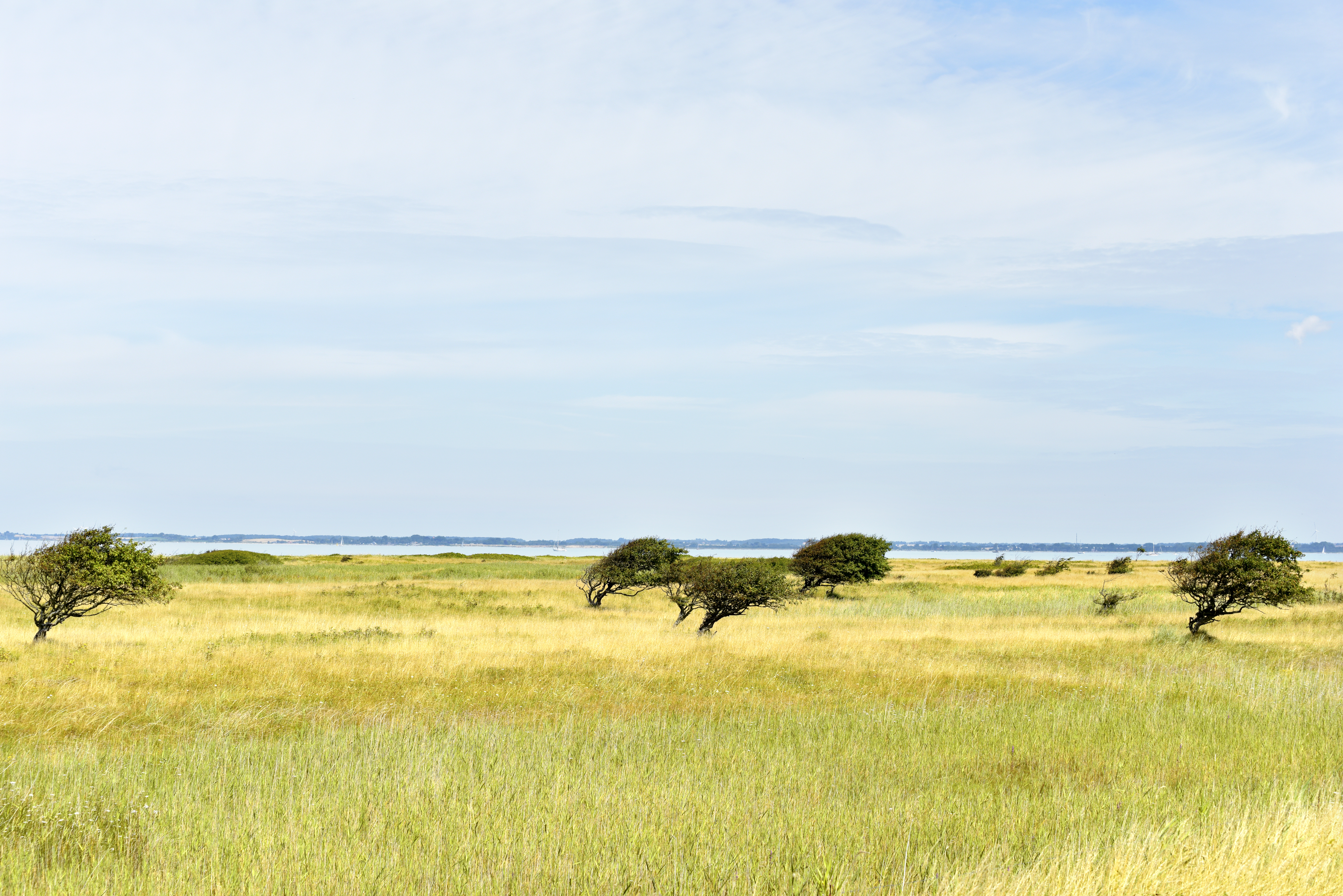
Landscape of the Geltinger Birk

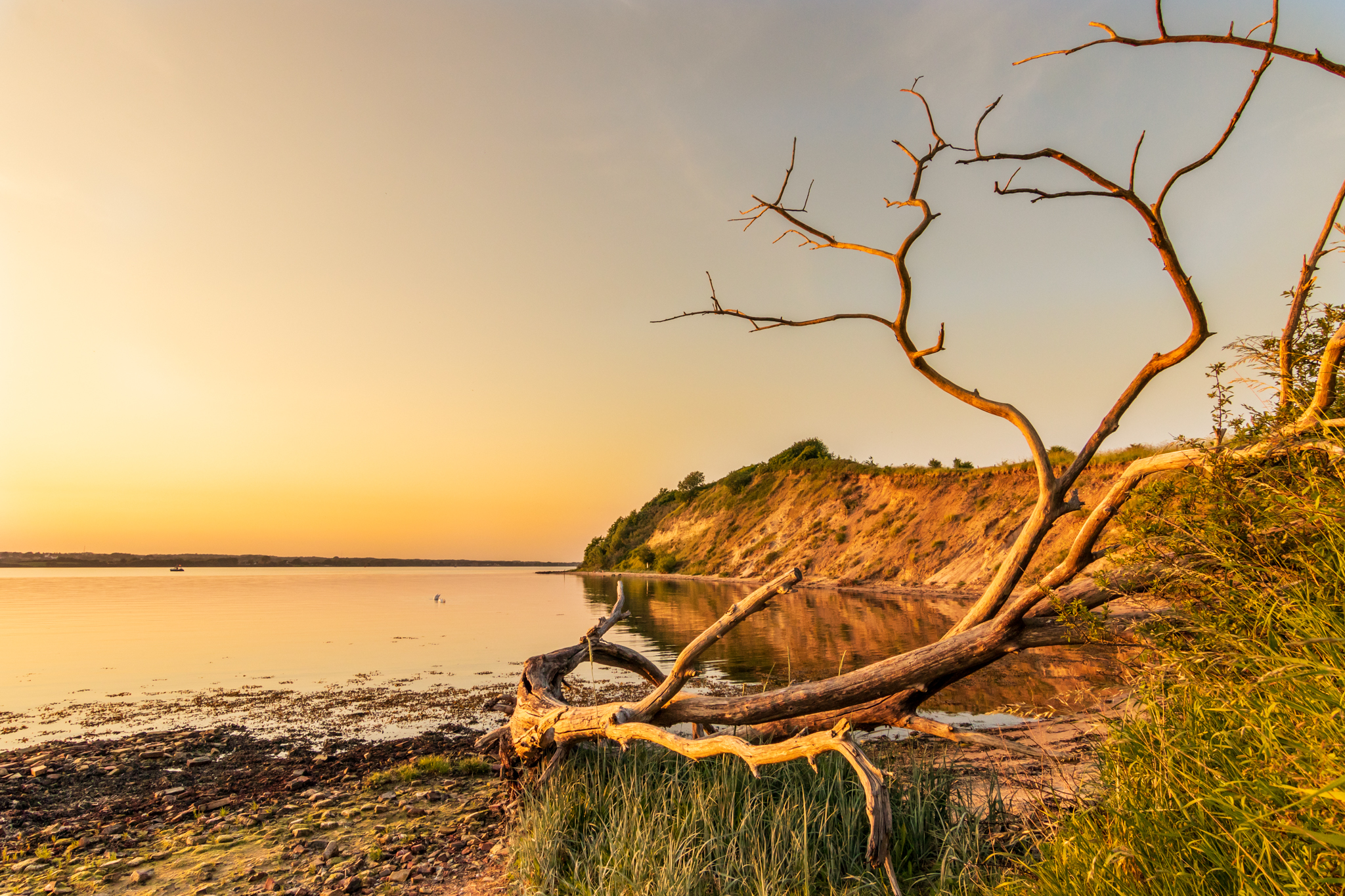
Coast of the Holnis peninsula

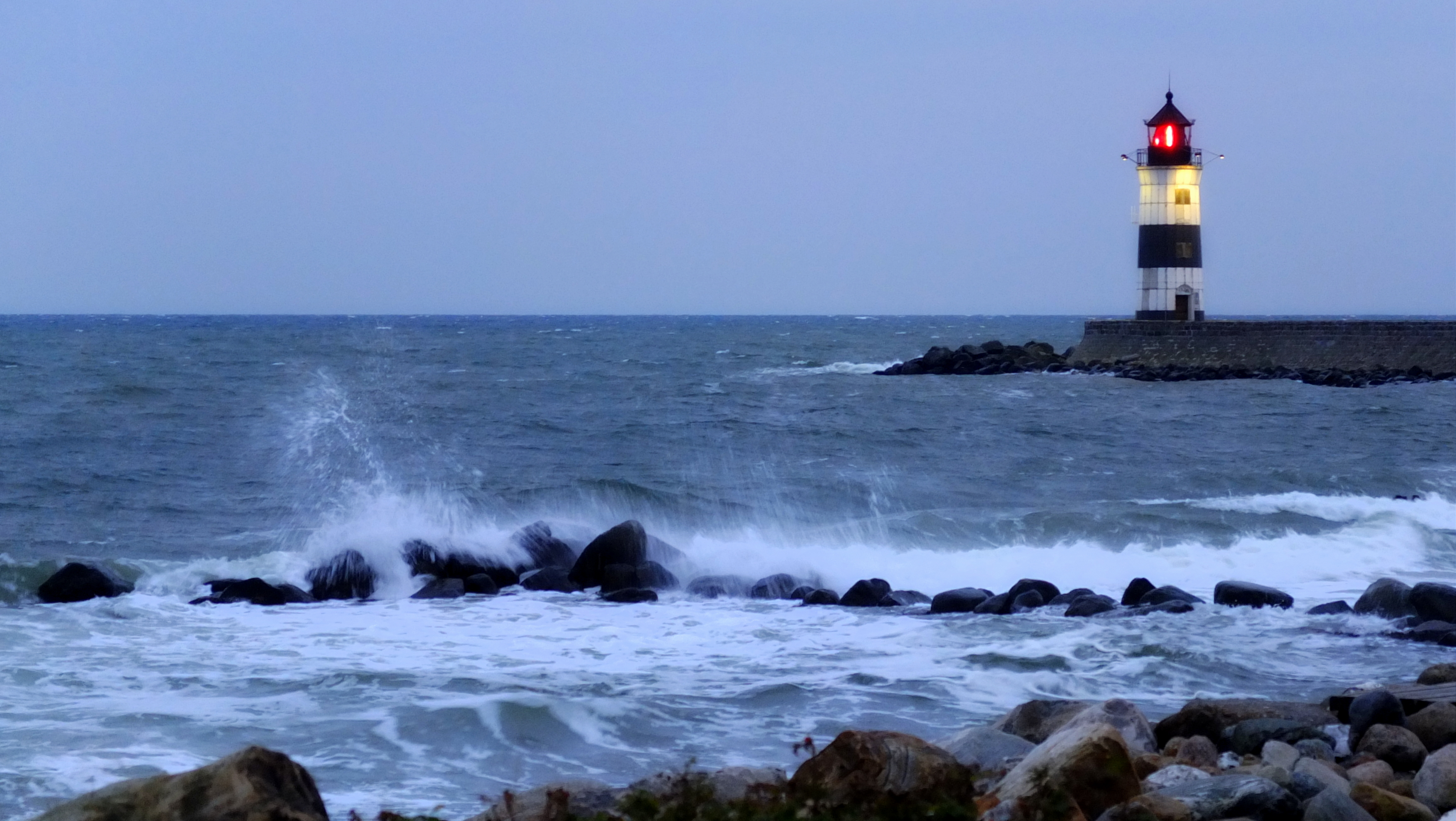
Schleimünde lighthouse

=== Cities ===
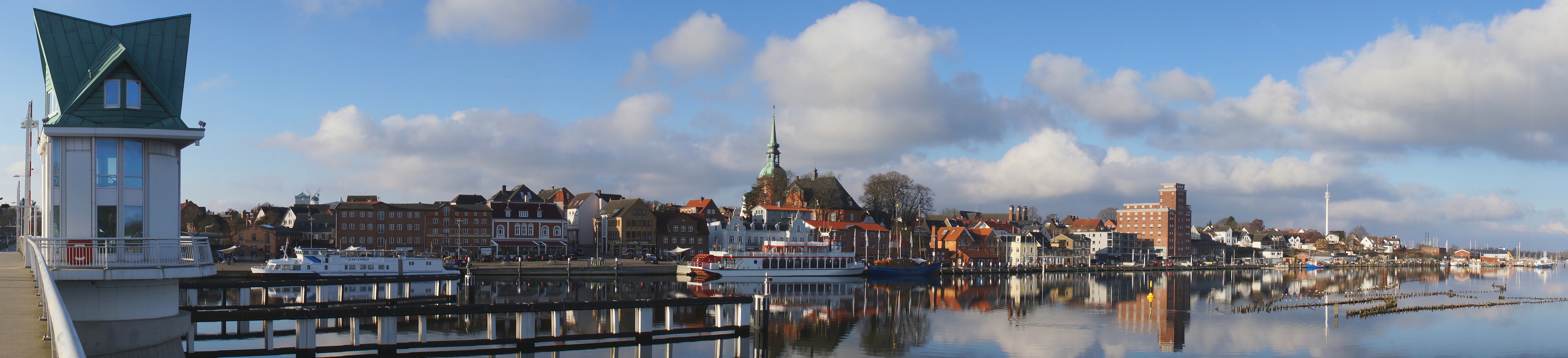
View of the harbour of Kappeln

There are five cities in Angeln. All other settlements are just municipalities, all belonging to an Amt, which is a collection of municipalities administratively classified as between the local and the county government. The only exception is the city of Arnis, which belongs to the Amt of Kappeln-Land.

Flensburg: The largest city touching Angeln territory is Flensburg (pop. 92,550). The city is called Flensborg in Low German and Danish, Flensborre in South Jutlandic, and Flansborj or Flensborag in North Frisian. Only about half of the city is considered part of Angeln, namely the eastern boroughs of Engelsby, Fruerlund, Jürgensby, Mürwik, Sandberg and Tarup, not in Angeln are the boroughs of Altstadt (Innenstadt), Friesischer Berg, Neustadt, Nordstadt, Südstadt, Weiche and Westliche Höhe. The Angeln districts alone have a population of around 46,000 inhabitants, which is enough to make Flensburg the by far most populous city in the region.

Schleswig: The second-largest city is Schleswig (pop. 25,832), which belongs almost entirely to Angeln, including the city centre. It is called Sleswig in Low German, Slesvig in Danish, and used to be called Slasvjig in Angeln Danish. There are just two boroughs that do not belong to Angeln because they are located on the adjacent Schwansen Peninsula: St. Jürgen and Klosterhof. To compensate for the loss of political and administrative functions as former capital of the Duchy of Schleswig and later the Province of Schleswig-Holstein, Schleswig became the seat of the Schleswig-Holsatian Higher Regional Court, the State Archives, the State Museum of Art and Cultural History and the Archaeological State Museum (the latter two being located in Gottorf Castle) between 1947 and 1948. Schleswig is therefore a cultural and the justicial centre for the state of Schleswig-Holstein.

Kappeln (Danish: Kappel) (pop. 8,607) is the third-largest city on Angeln territory. Although most of the city's area has been on the Schwansen Peninsula since the incorporation of Olpenitz in 1970, most of the districts and the city centre belong to Angeln. The Angeln boroughs are: Dothmark, Ellenberg, Kappeln (core city), Mehlby, Sandbek and Stutebüll. The boroughs in Schwansen are: Kopperby and Olpenitz. In Kappeln, the region's largest urban development project is being carried out, in the course of which the former Olpenitz naval base is being converted into the "Olpenitz Baltic Sea Resort" (de:Ostseeresort Olpenitz).

Glücksburg (Ostsee): The fourth-largest city of Glücksburg (Ostsee) (pop. 6,377) is the largest city lying entirely in Angeln. It is called Glücksborg in Low German and Lyksborg in Danish. It is the northernmost city in Germany, as List on Sylt, that is known as northernmost settlement of the country, is just a village and municipality. The core area of the city consists of the boroughs of Bremsberg (Bremsbjerg), Sandwig (Sandvig) with Quellental (Kildedal), and Ulstrupfeld (Ulstrupmark). The entire area of the Holnis Peninsula was incorporated into Glücksburg.

Arnis: With less than 300 inhabitants, Arnis (Danish: Arnæs) (pop. 273) is the least populous city in Germany and, at 0.45 square kilometres (0.17 sq mi), also the smallest city in terms of area. The city extends on a densely built-up small peninsula in the middle of the Schlei.

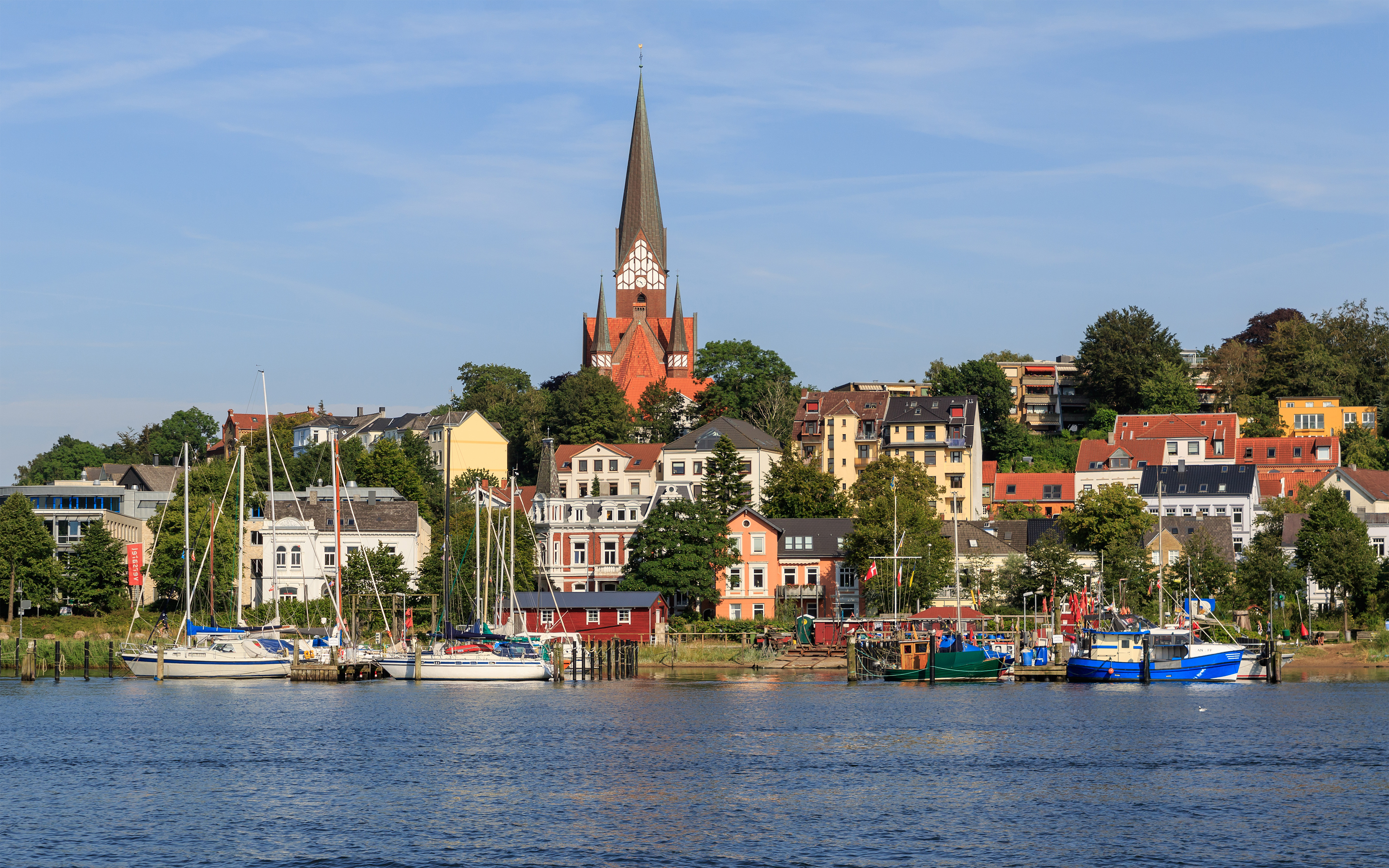
Flensburg is the largest town in Angeln. View of the borough of Jürgensby (Jørgensby) on the Angeln side of the Flensburg Firth.

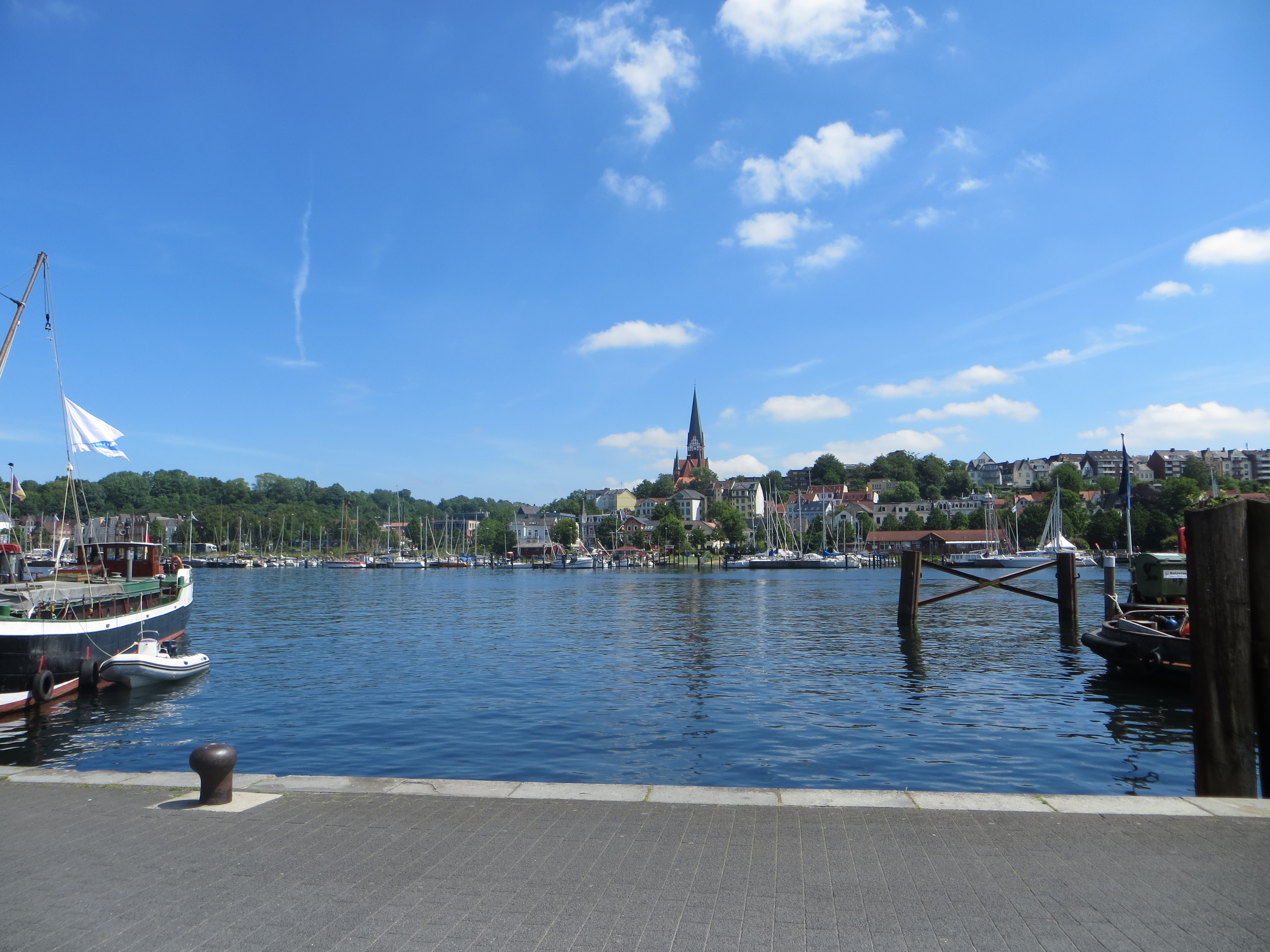
Another view of Jürgensby and the harbour of Flensburg.

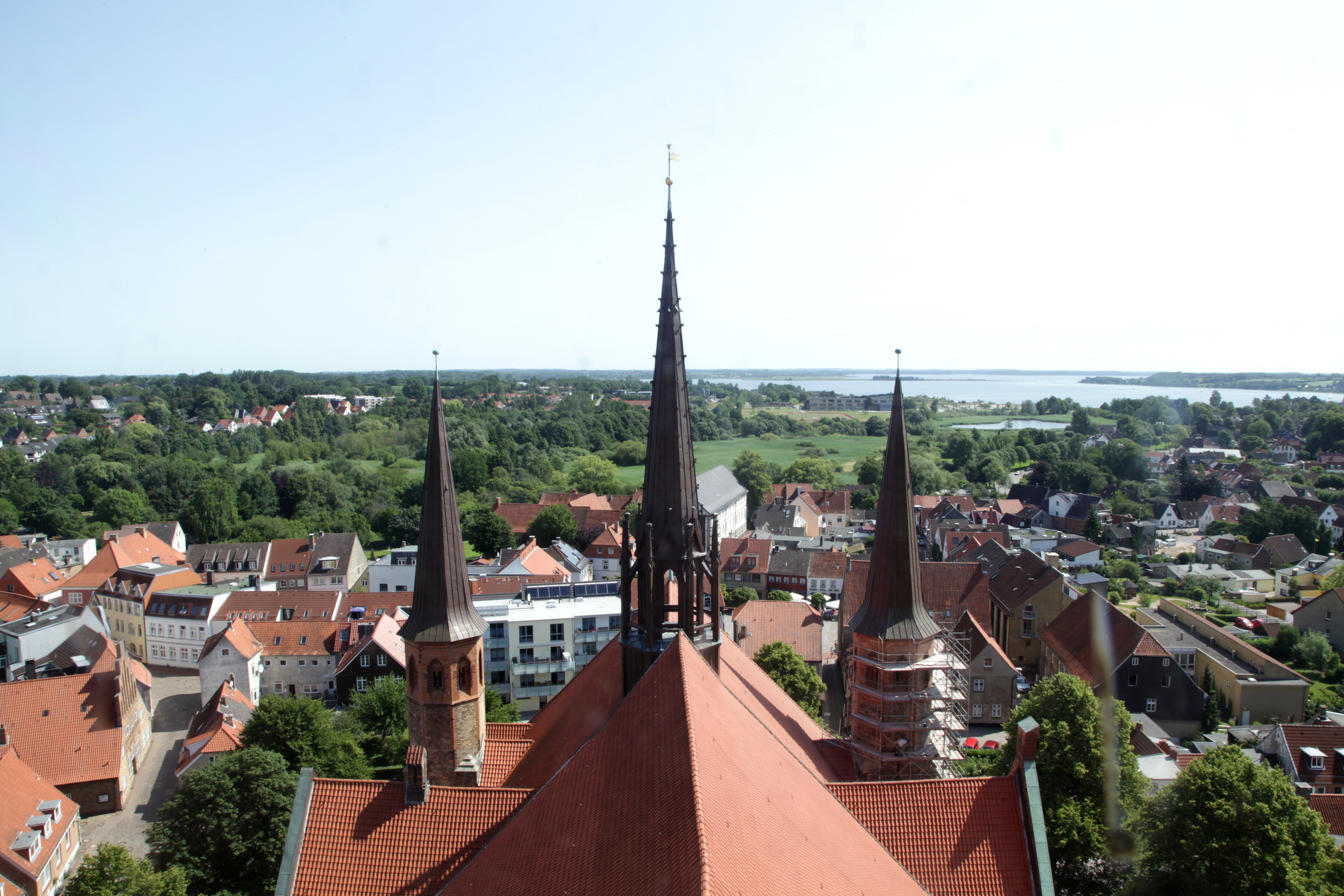
View from Schleswig Cathedral

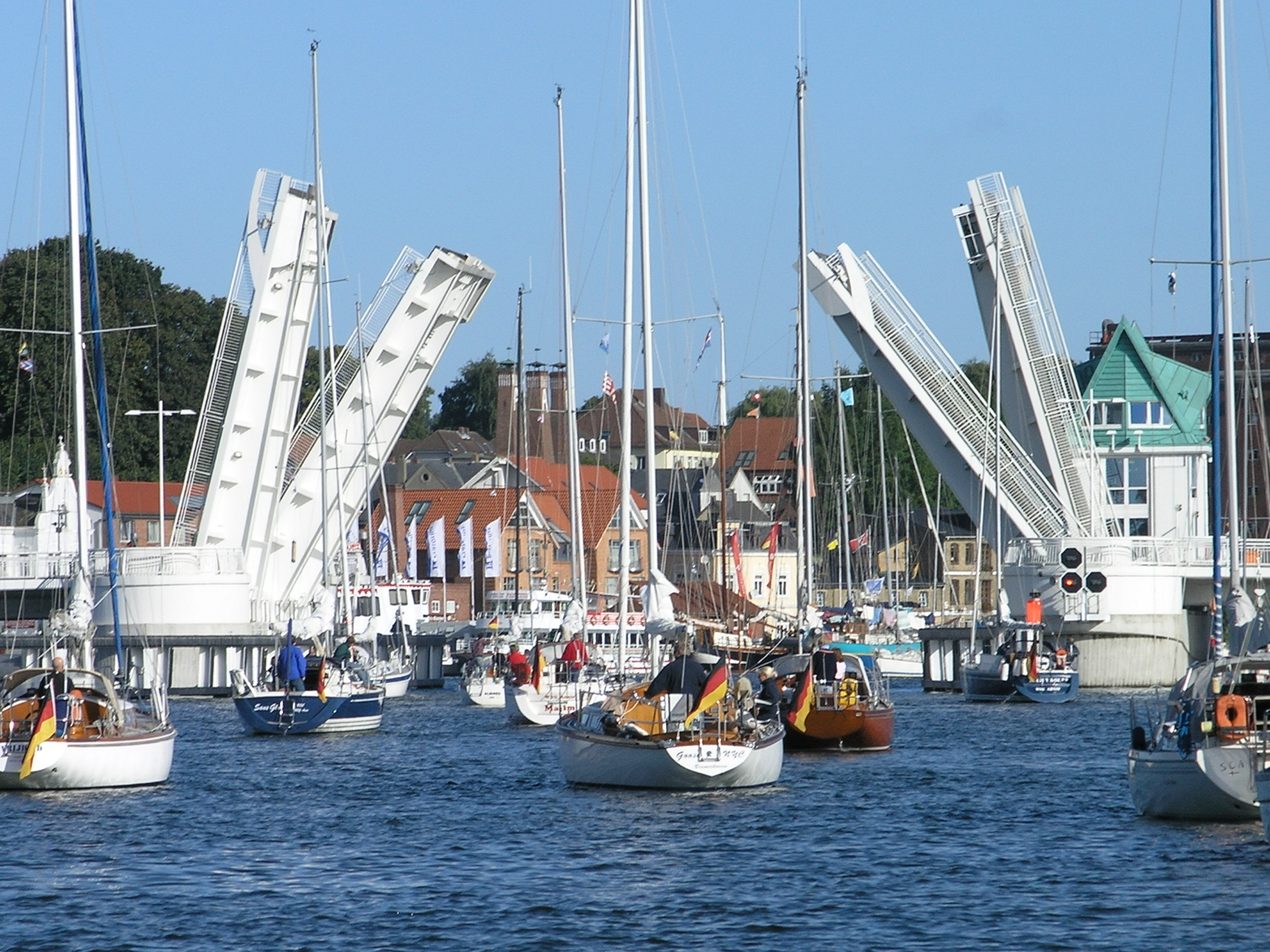
View of the Schlei Bridge in Kappeln

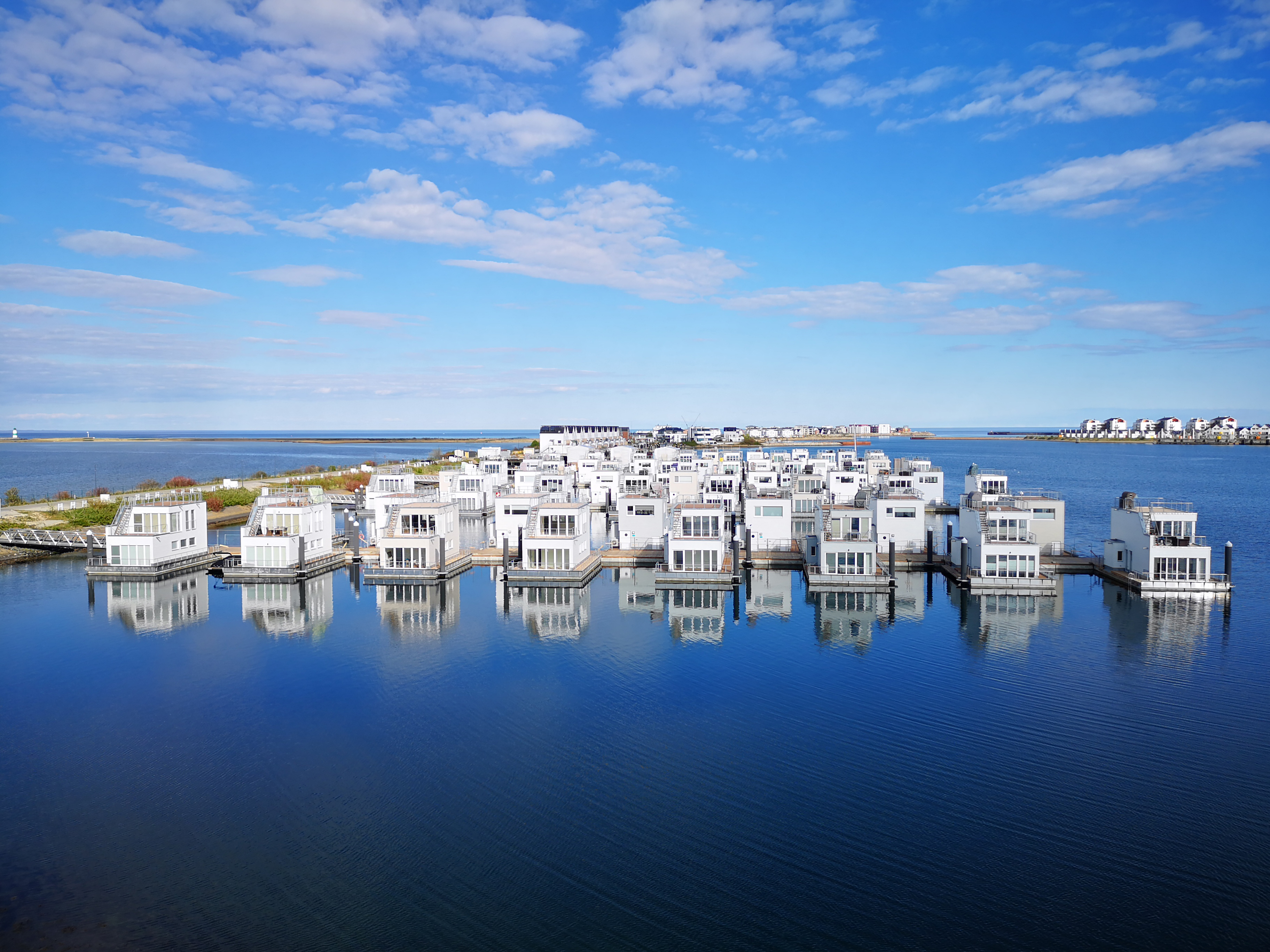
View of the Baltic Sea Resort in Kappeln-Olpenitz

== Transport ==
=== Rail ===
The Neumünster–Flensburg railway runs along the western edge of Angeln, and connects the two largest Angeln cities of Flensburg and Schleswig via the stations of Tarp and Jübek. In the south, it merges into the route to Hamburg, and in the north into the route to Fredericia.

Angeln is crossed by the Kiel–Flensburg railway, that runs from the Schleswig-Holsatian capital of Kiel to Flensburg and connects the Baltic Sea ports of Kiel, Eckernförde and Flensburg. After leaving Kiel, it crosses the Kiel Canal on the Levensau High Bridge, and then runs via Eckernförde and across the Schwansen Peninsula in the direction of the Schlei. It crosses the Schlei on the Lindaunis Bridge - a bascule bridge that has been broken for many years and is to be replaced by a new structure by 2027 - between the stations Rieseby in Schwansen, and Lindaunis, which is the first station in Angeln. It then runs across Angeln in the direction of Flensburg via the stations Süderbrarup, Sörup and Husby. An additional stop is to be set up in Flensburg-Tarup.

At Süderbrarup station, the "Angeln Steam Railway" (Angelner Dampfeisenbahn) (de) branches off from the Kiel–Flensburg line. It runs from Süderbrarup to Kappeln via Wagersrott, Scheggerott, Rabenkirchen, Faulück and Arnis-Grödersby. Some journeys carried out with railbuses do not end in Süderbrarup, but continue all the way to Flensburg.

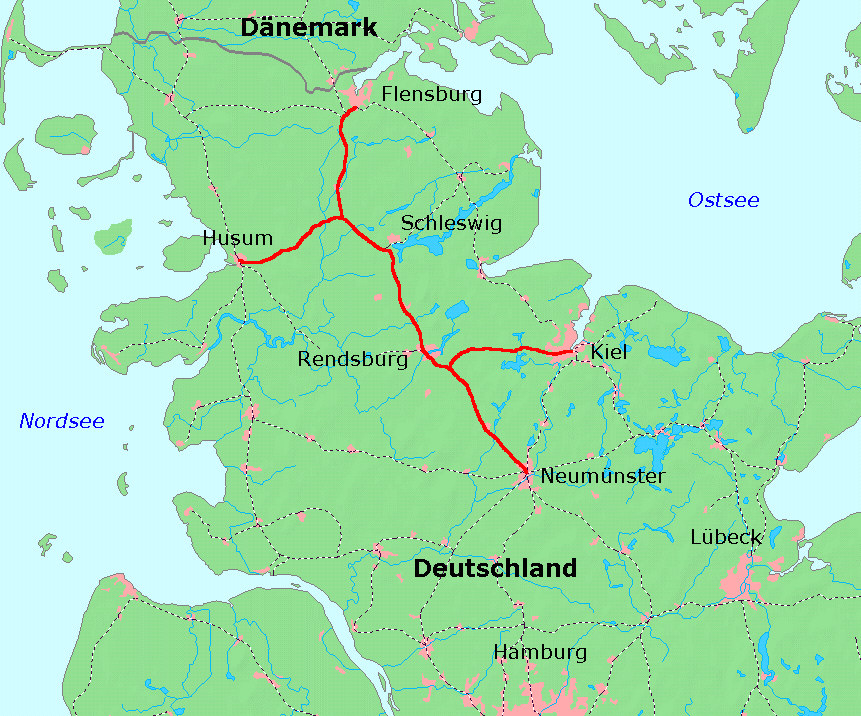
The Neumünster–Flensburg railway

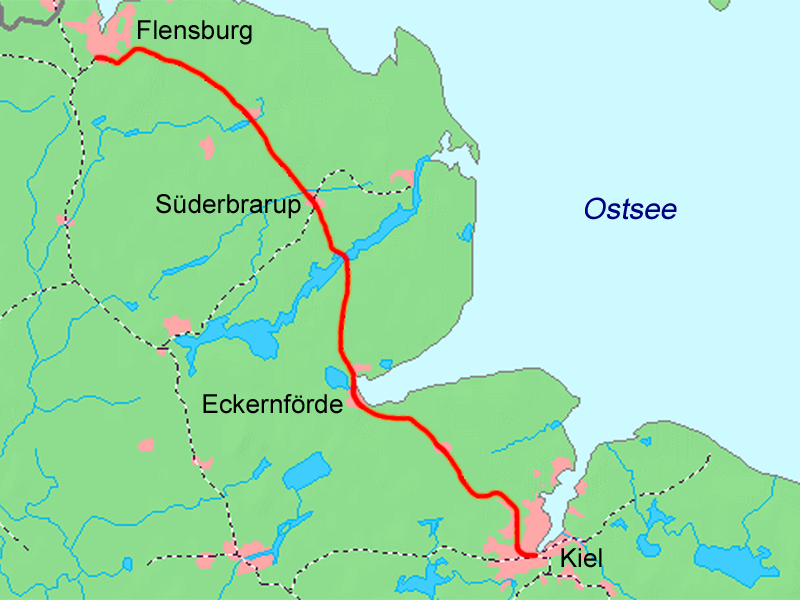
The Kiel–Flensburg railway

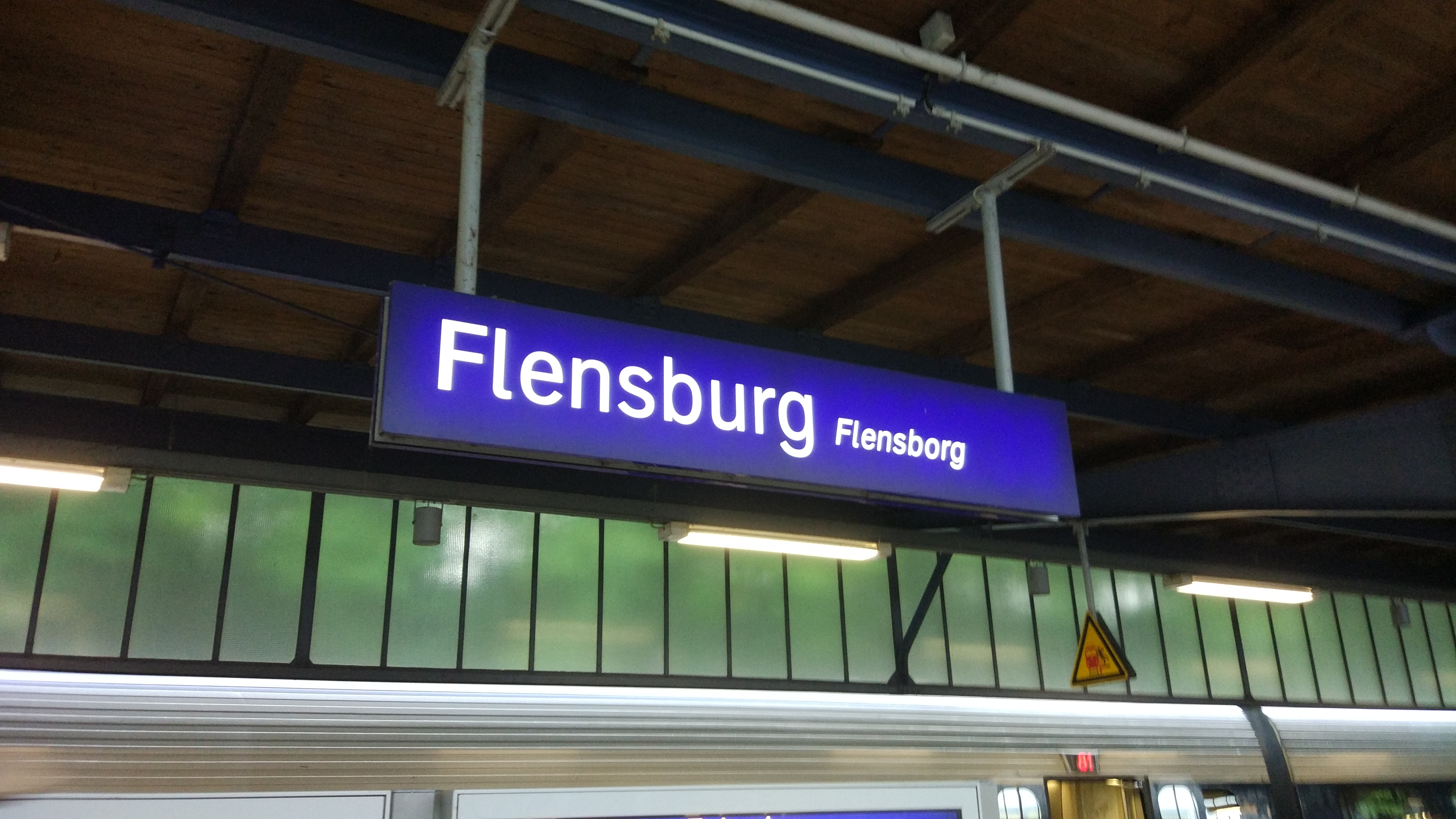
Bilingual German/Danish signage at Flensburg train station

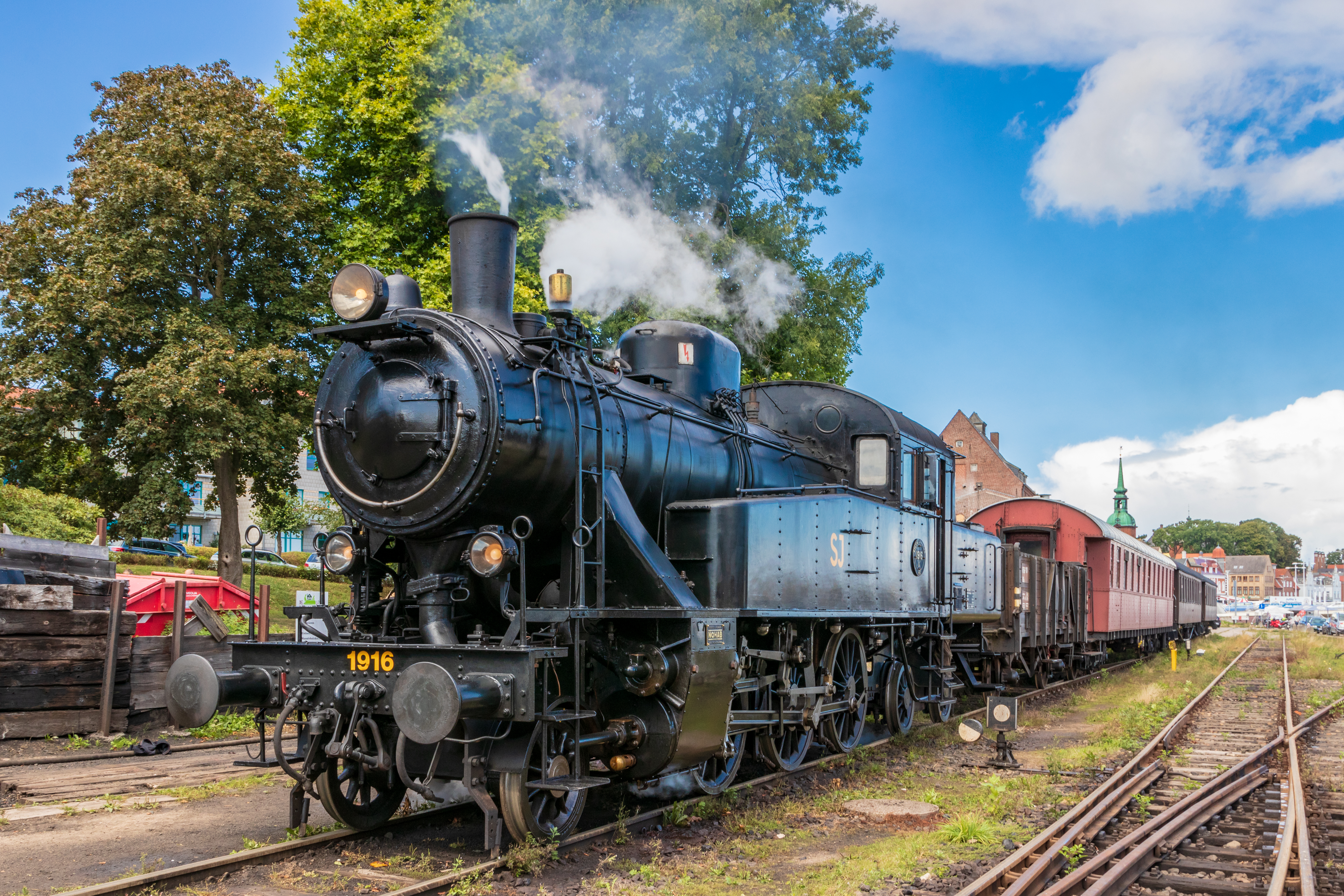
The Angeln Steam Railway at Kappeln

=== Road ===
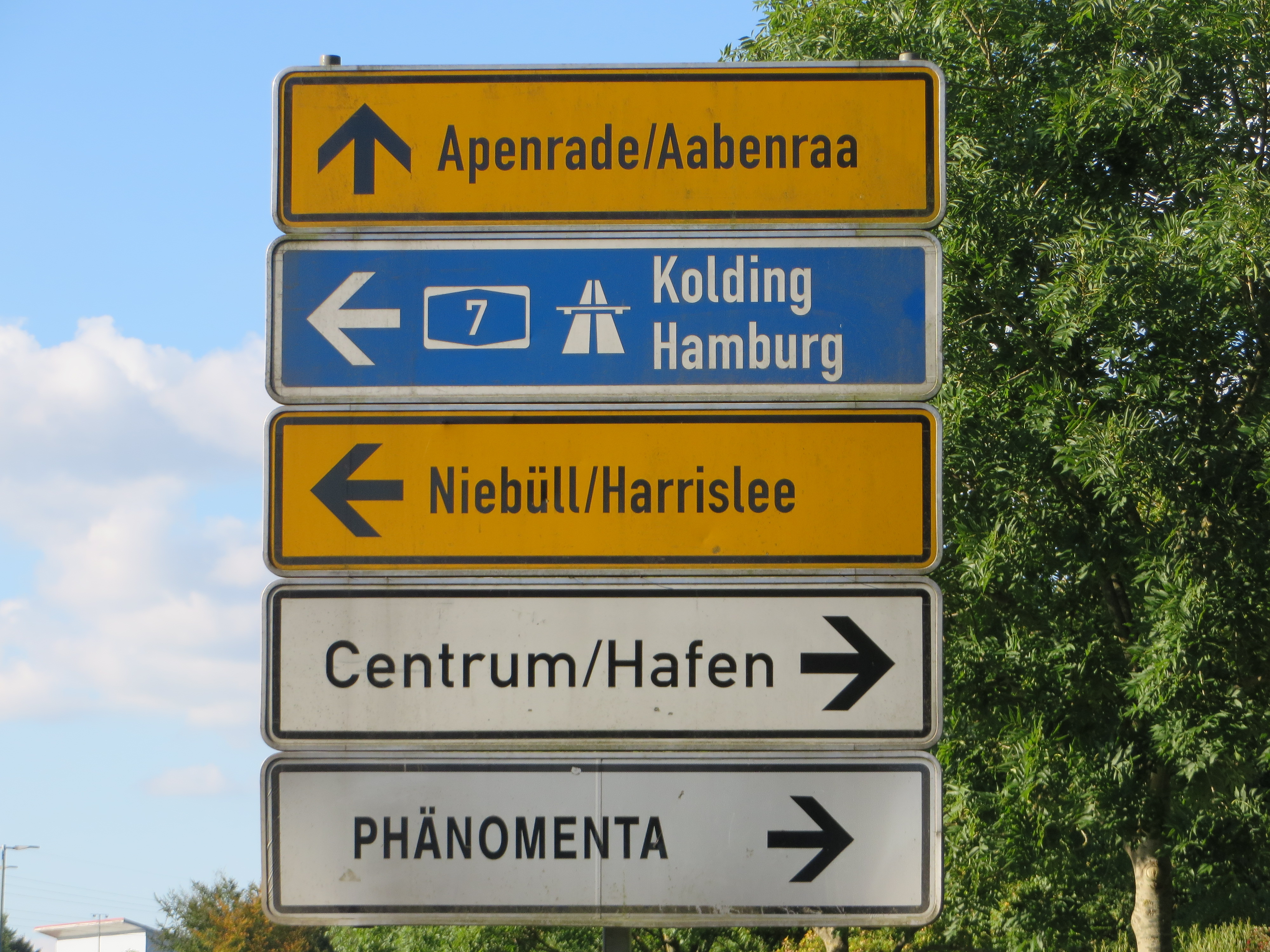
Signposts to the motorway 7 near Harrisleer Kreuz

The Bundesautobahn 7 (Federal Motorway 7, from Grenzübergang/Grænseovergang Ellund (D)/Frøslev (DK) to Grenzübergang Füssen (D)/Vils (AT)) runs along the western edge of Angeln, and connects Flensburg to Schleswig. Exits along the Angeln Peninsula are "Flensburg/Harrislee", "Flensburg", "Tarp" and "Schleswig/Schuby". It merges into the Danish Sønderjyske Motorvej (E45) in the direction of Kolding in the north.

== Languages ==
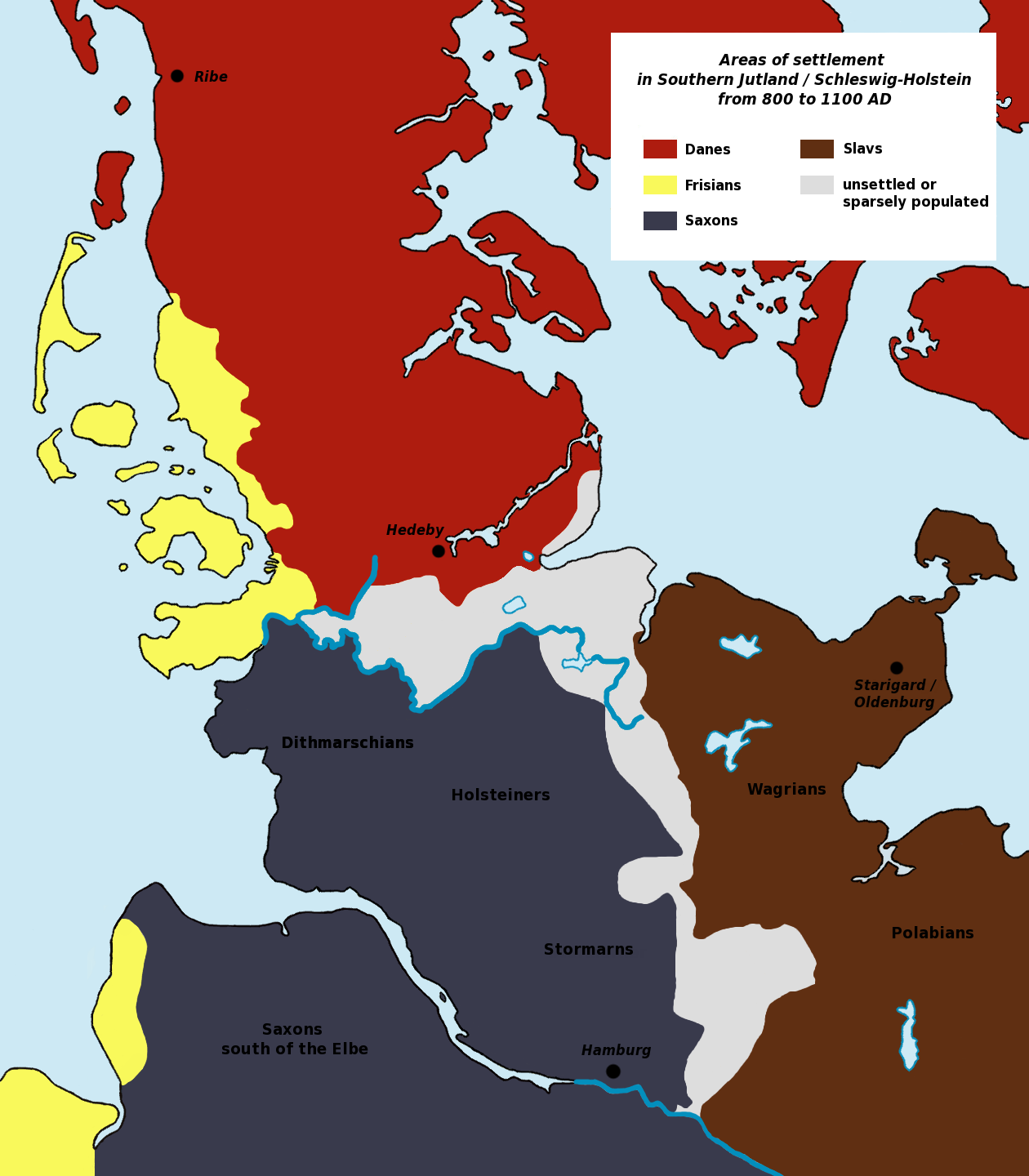
Linguistic map of Schleswig-Holstein in the Middle Ages

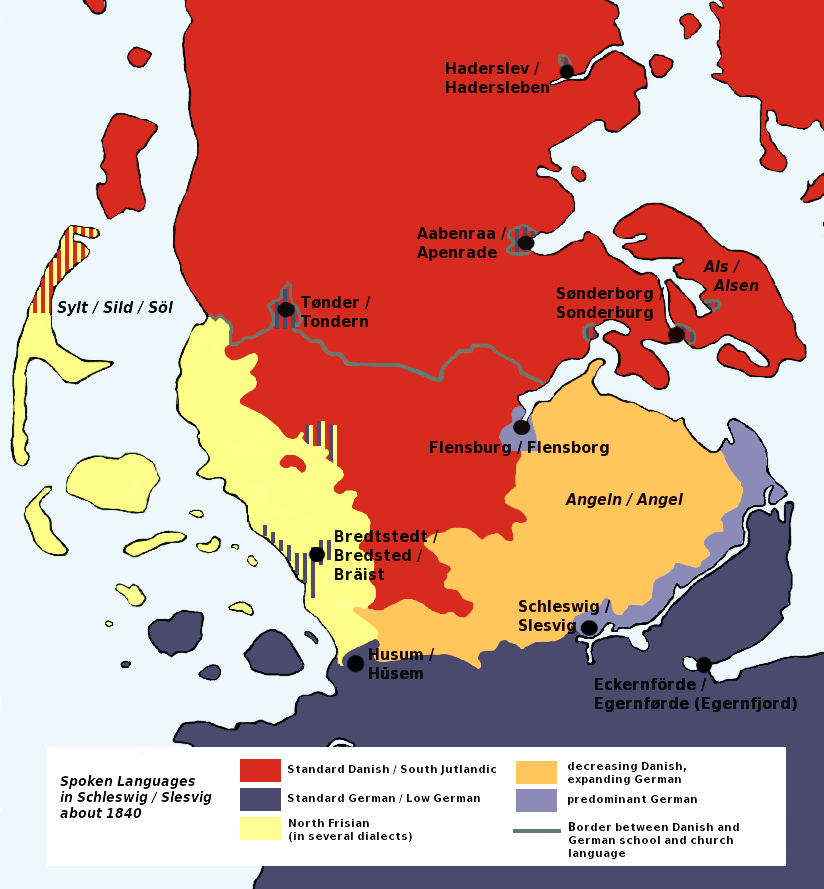
Linguistic map of Schleswig-Holstein in the 19th century, showing the growth of German

The language most spoken in Angeln is German. However the peninsula is also part of the language area of Danish and Low German. The latter is more closely related to English than German is, since it was not affected by the High German consonant shift.

Before the 9th century Angeln was inhabited by the Angles, who spoke a West Germanic dialect that would later evolve into English. A language shift to North Germanic occurred following the departure of the Angles, when the peninsula was occupied by Danes. Danish became the main language of the region between the 9th and 19th centuries. In the 19th century another language shift occurred and the predominant language changed from the North Germanic Danish to the West Germanic Low German. Low German has since been gradually superseded by a variety of Standard German with Low German traits.

The variety of Danish indigenous to Angeln was Angel Danish, a dialect of South Jutlandic (the southernmost variety of Danish spoken on the Jutland peninsula, formerly spoken as far south as Eckernförde).

Danish continues to be spoken in Angeln by a minority but the dialects spoken nowadays are Southern Schleswig Danish, which are not dialects of the previously indigenous South Jutlandic but (Low) German-influenced dialects of Standard Danish. The cities with the largest Danish-speaking minorities are Flensburg, Schleswig and Glücksburg.

Many Angeln place-names are of Danish origin, including those ending in -by (town), such as Brodersby, Nieby and Husby, and -rup (hamlet), such as Sörup, Sterup and Tastrup.

== History ==
=== Early history ===
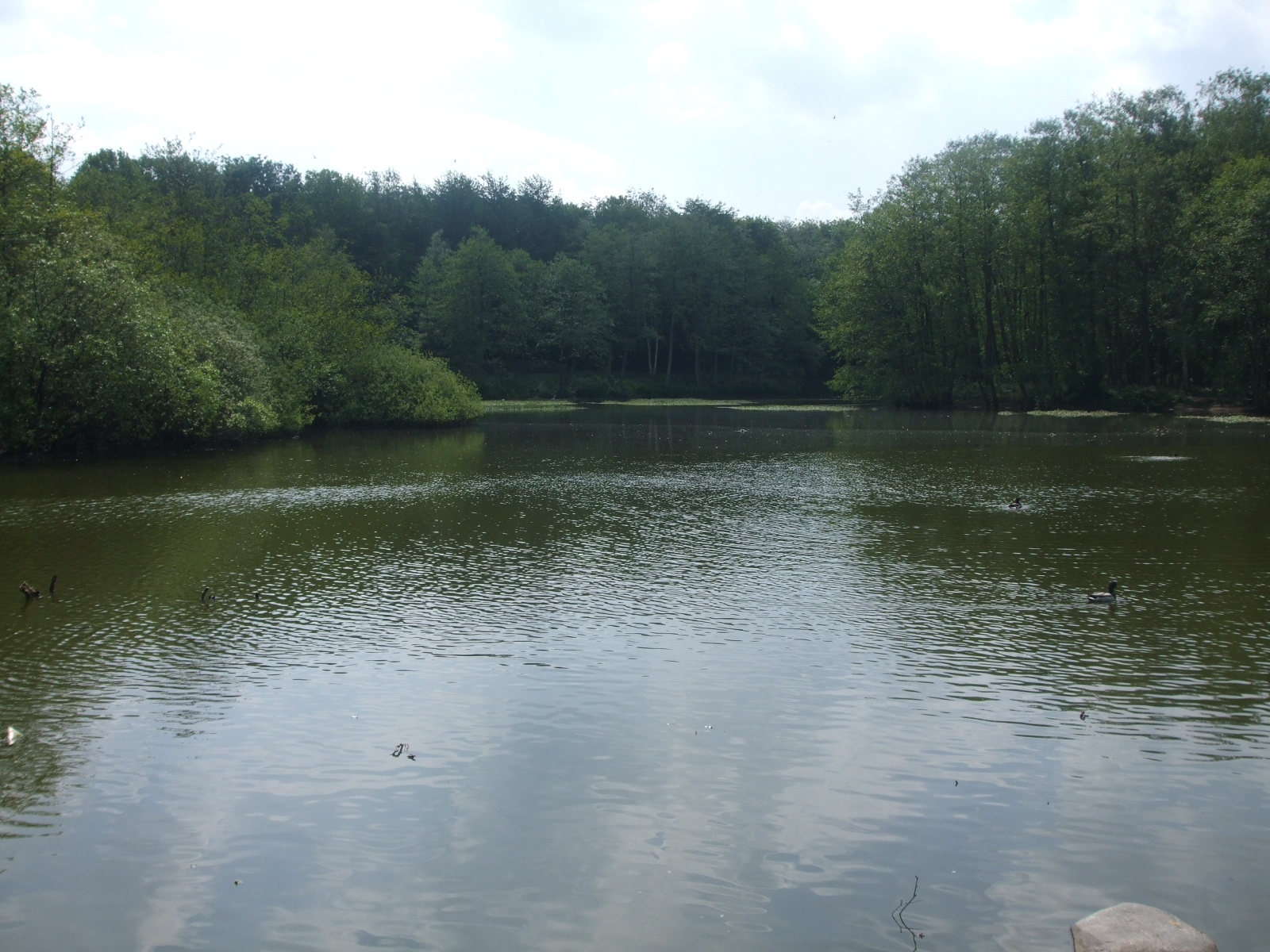
Thorsberg Moor

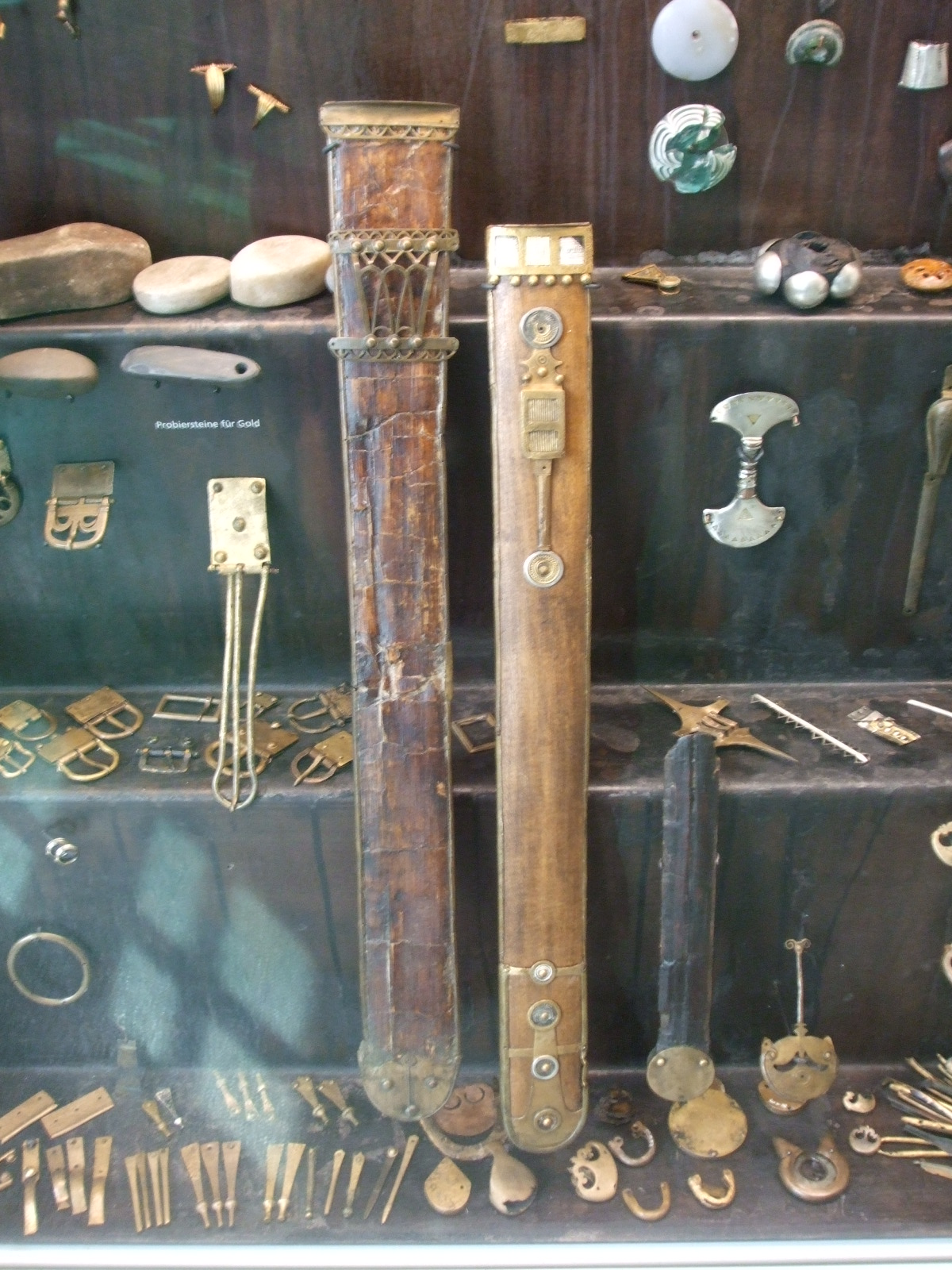
Archaeological objects found in Thorsberg Moor, now at Gottorf Castle, Schleswig

The region was home to the Germanic Angles, some of whom, together with Saxons and Jutes, left their homeland to migrate to the island of Great Britain in the 5th and 6th centuries.

==== Thorsberg Moor as most important Angeln archaeological site ====
Thorsberg moor is a peat bog in the municipality of Süderbrarup. This inconspicuous body of water is an important archaeological site and was a Germanic sacrificial bog from the times of the Roman Empire. In the period from the 1st century to the early 5th century objects were sacrificed in several phases in Thorsberg Moor, presumably by members of the West Germanic tribe of the Angles. Numerous important and rich cultural and historical finds were made in the bog in the 19th century, some of which are on display at the Schleswig-Holstein State Museum of Art and Cultural History in Gottorf Castle in Schleswig and at the National Museum of Denmark in Copenhagen. The current name of the bog does not allow the assumption that the sanctuary was already consecrated to the god Thor at the time of the Angles. Rather, the naming is based on early medieval Danish influence, especially in the Viking Age. With the migration of most Angles to Britain came widespread discontinuity in settlement and cultural structure in Angeln. Whilst it is possible that the early-medieval Danish settlers did worship Thor, the name is more likely to be traced back to a hill with a Viking-Age burial ground and finds, the Thorsberg.

==== Emigration of the Angles to Britain ====
The settlement density in Angeln apparently decreased dramatically in the 5th and 6th centuries and many villages fell into disrepair. A sharp decline in grain pollen suggests that fields were deserted. Locations with heavy clay soils were abandoned first. Since more pollen was found at some locations of the Schleswig Geest (the region neighbouring Angeln), it is assumed that the climate had changed. Increased rainfall could explain this move to the sandy geest areas. Another reason for leaving settlements near the coast is believed to be attacks from the sea. This initially regional migration would also explain another phenomenon: it is now considered likely that between the end of the settlement period of the Angles in Angeln and their arrival in eastern and central England up to 100 years passed. The Angles would have initially moved west, to the Schleswig Geest, before leaving their home completely.

For the years 449–455 the Anglo-Saxon Chronicle, written around 890, describes how Vortigern, a British king, invited the Angles to come and receive land in return for helping him defend his realm against marauding Picts. Those successful Angles sent word back that good land was available and that the British were "worthless". A wholesale emigration of Angles and kindred Germanic peoples followed, after which, says the Chronicle, Angeln "has ever since remained waste betwixt the Jutes and Saxons."

The Chronicle, commissioned by Alfred the Great, drew on earlier oral traditions and on the few written fragments available. The best of these, written around 730, was by the monk Bede, whose history of English Christianity contains the following brief account of the origin and distribution of the Angles:

From the Angles, that is, the country which is called Angulus, and which is said, from that time, to remain desert to this day, between the provinces of the Jutes and the Saxons, are descended the East Angles, the Midland Angles, Mercians, all the race of the Northumbrians, that is, of those nations that dwell on the north side of the River Humber, and the other nations of the English.

— Bede's Ecclesiastical History of the English People, Book I, Chapter XV, 731 A.D.

The phrase "north of the Humber" refers to the northern kingdom of Northumbria, which included most of northern England and part of southern Scotland. Mercia was located in central England and broadly corresponds to the English Midlands.

This account can be related to the evidence of archaeology, notably the distribution of types of fibulae, or brooches, worn by both men and women in antiquity. Eastern and northern Britain were settled by groups wearing cruciform brooches, of the style in fashion at the time in coastal Scandinavia, Denmark, and Schleswig-Holstein south to the lower Elbe and east to the Oder, as well as a pocket in coastal Friesland.

=== Later history ===
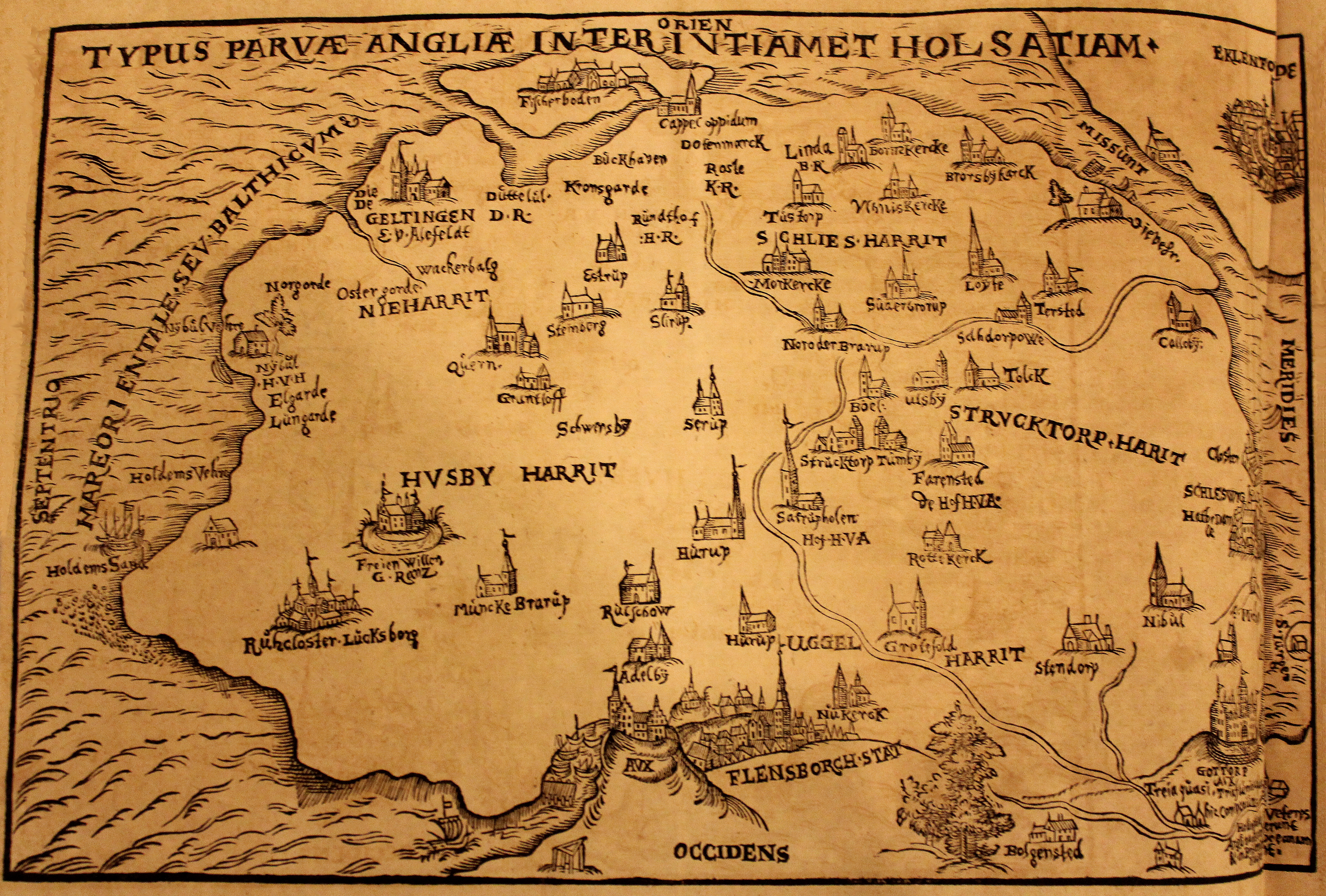
16th-century map of Angeln, oriented eastwards

It is assumed that by around 550 AD the peninsula was only very sparsely populated, or at least that the population had declined significantly. The fact that the name Angeln persisted for the area could indicate that a small portion of the original population remained. After 600 AD, Jutes and Danes settled on the peninsula, a fact still evident in many place names in Angeln ending in -by and -rup, meaning "village" and "settlement," respectively. South of the Eider River, such Nordic place names occur only sporadically. In the 10th century the chronicler Æthelweard reported that the most important town in Angeln was Hedeby. Even today, many Angeln residents identify as belonging to the Danish minority. However, the (Low) German language began to spread increasingly in modern times; in the course of the 19th century, Angel Danish was completely replaced by German and Standard Danish. The last record of the dialect was made in northern Angeln in the 1930s.

== Coat of arms and flags ==
The unofficial coat of arms of Angeln was designed by Hans Nicolai Andreas Jensen and appeared for the first time in 1847. It consists of nine fields, all but one of which represent the historic Danish hundreds (Danish: herreder, German: Harden) of Angeln:

- Husbyharde (Husby Herred): stylized house
- Munkbrarupharde (Munkbrarup Herred): Saint Lawrence griddle
- Nieharde (Ny Herred): star and crescent
- Schliesharde (Slis Herred): herring and waves
- Eastern Angeln was not part of a hundred, but was directly subordinate to the sovereign. It was only converted into the Kappelner Harde (Kappel Herred) in 1853, and is therefore symbolized by two Schleswig lions.
- Struxdorfharde (Strukstrup Herred): stylized oak
- Satrupharde (Satrup Herred): scythe
- Mohrkirchharde (Mårkær Herred): tau cross
- Füsingharde (Fysing Herred): crossed keys

In the original draft of the coat of arms, the hundred of Husby was symbolically represented by two crossed arrows with a heart in front of them. From 1906 at the latest, the stylized house corresponding to the old hundred seal appeared instead. The original version of the coat of arms can therefore still be found occasionally. The Uggelharde, which only partially lay in Angeln, is not represented in the arms.

Two unofficial flags are in use, one showing the colours of Schleswig-Holstein and the other showing the Nordic cross from the flag of Denmark.

Angeln coat of arms

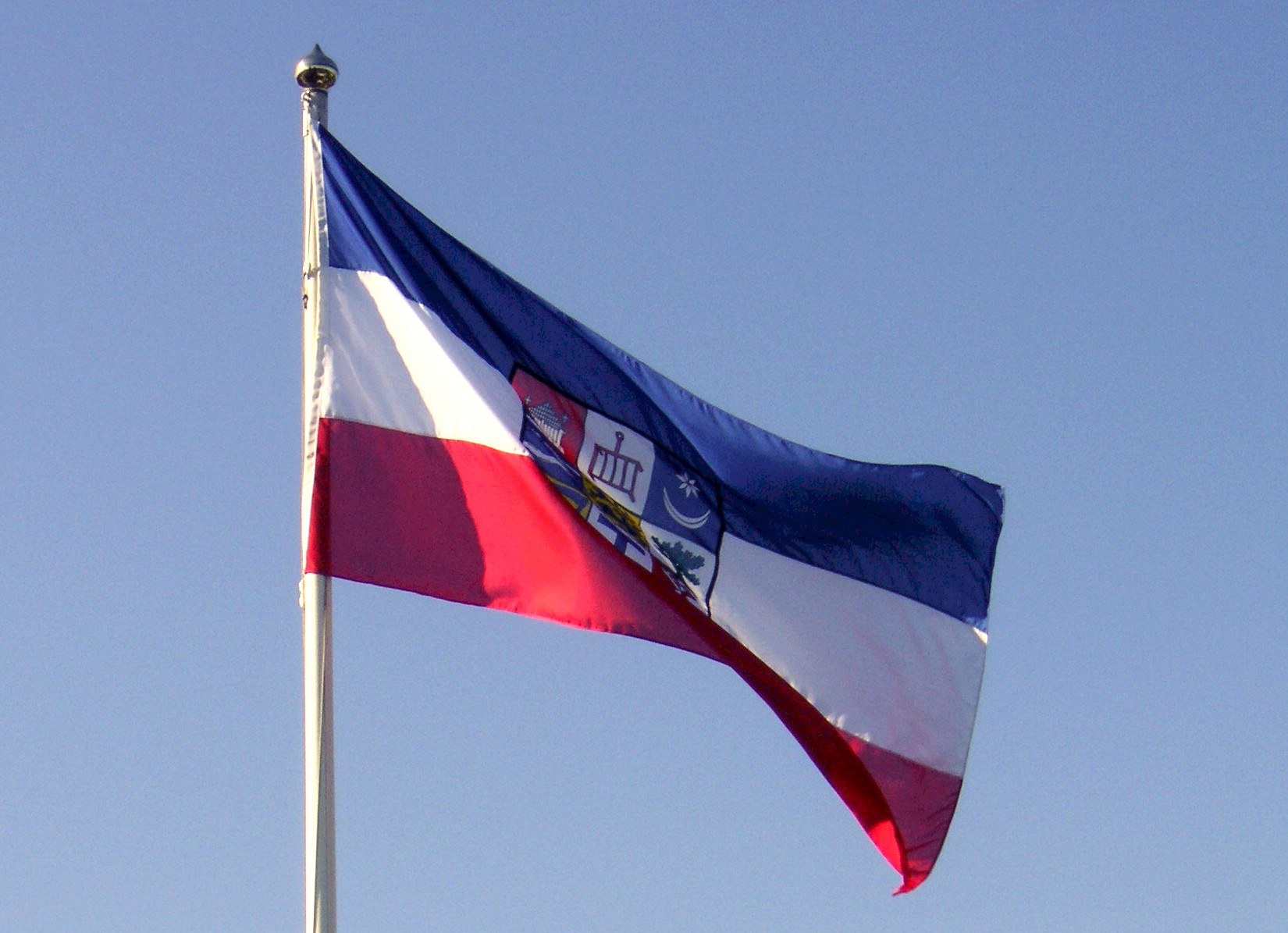
Angeln flag

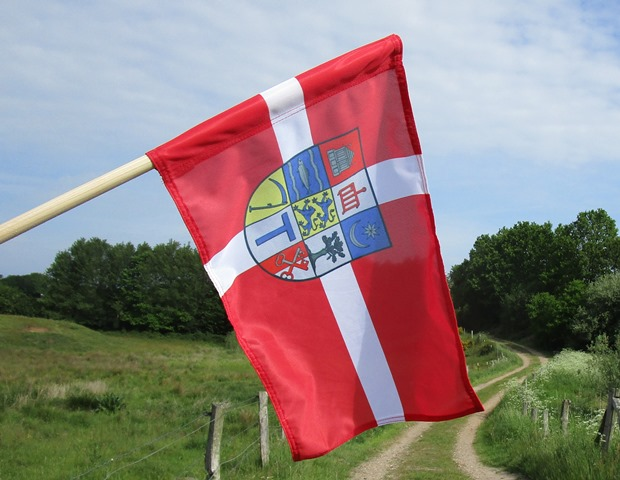
Danish-style flag

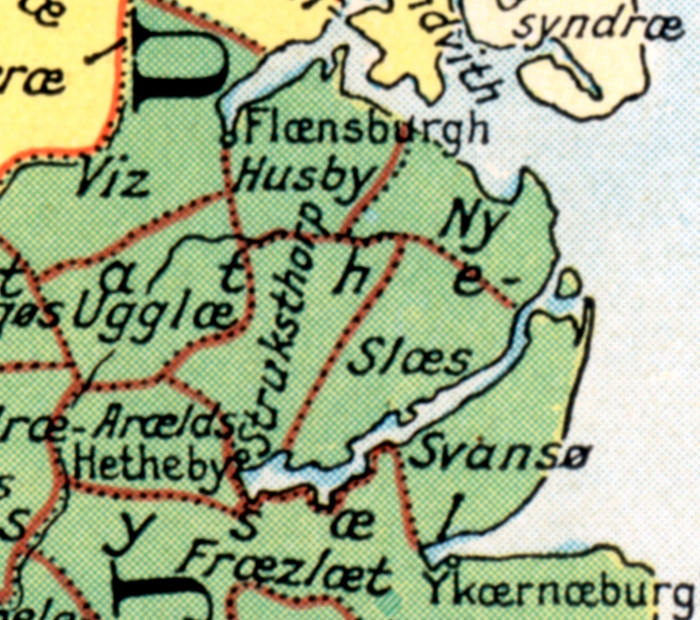
Former subdivision of Angeln into herreder

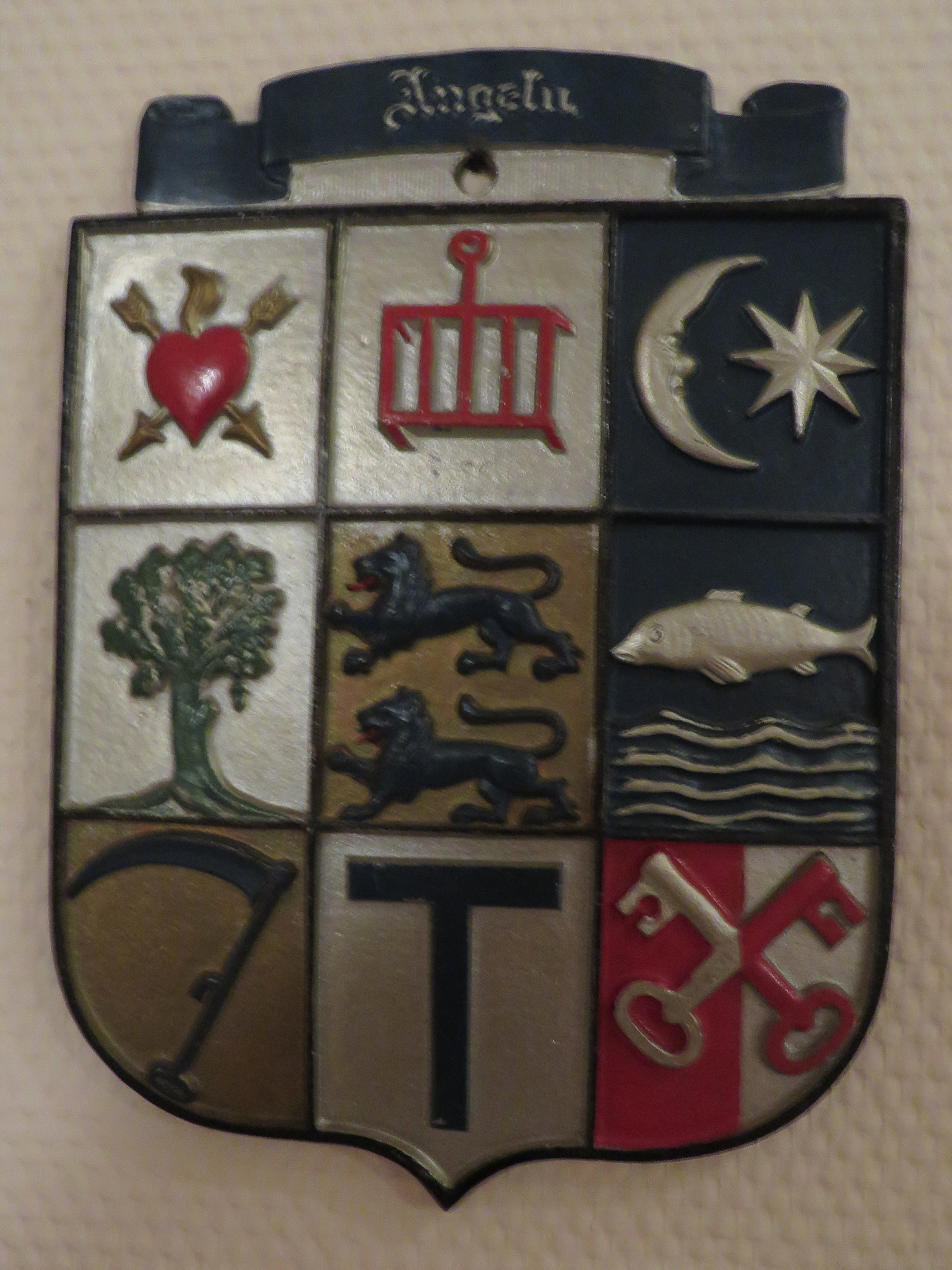
Angeln coat of arms as it appeared from 1847 to 1906

== Economy ==
=== Naval Academy Mürwik ===
The Naval Academy Mürwik in Flensburg-Mürwik is the officer training school of the German Navy. German naval officers have been trained there since 1910. Naval officers receive their general military training at the MSM. Malbork Castle, a former Teutonic Knights' fortress, was supposedly the architectural model at the request of Kaiser Wilhelm II. The building complex with its red brick facades is prominently situated on the Flensburg Fjord and is therefore also known as the Rote Burg an der Förde ("Red Castle on the Fjord") and the Rotes Schloss am Meer ("Red Palace by the Sea"). The Osbek stream flows through a ravine on the south side. Other buildings for the MSM were erected in the surrounding area, including the Naval Water Tower and the Flensburg-Mürwik Naval Hospital.

The Sonwik harbor district is the civilian-inhabited, waterfront part of the Flensburg-Mürwik naval base district, which also includes the Mürwik Naval Academy. The 12.5-hectare area largely comprises the facilities of the former Flensburg-Mürwik naval base. It belongs to the Mürwik district and consists primarily of the Sonwik Marina, bordered by 20 nationally acclaimed waterfront buildings, and a waterfront promenade lined with former naval buildings in the North German Brick Neo-Gothic style.

=== Seaside Resorts ===
Angeln boasts several seaside resorts, most of which are officially recognized as health resorts. These are from northwest to southeast: Harrislee-Wassersleben (formerly Sostie; Danish: Harreslev-Sosti; where the Baltic Sea reaches its westernmost point), Glücksburg-Sandwig (Lyksborg-Sandvig), which is the location of the Strandhotel Glücksburg, also known as "White Castle by the Sea", Munkbrarup, Langballig (Langballe), Westerholz (Vesterskov), Steinbergkirche (Stenbjergkirke), Steinberg (Stenbjerg), Niesgrau (Nisvrå), Gelting, Nieby (Nyby), Pommerby, Kronsgaard, Hasselberg (Hasselbjerg) and Maasholm (Masholm).

=== Tolk-Schau ===
The Tolk-Schau (lit. 'Tolk-Show') is a family amusement park in Tolk, near the city of Schleswig. It is primarily aimed at families with children up to about eleven years old. The Tolk-Schau originated in the 1960s from a tourist attraction designed as a fairytale forest and is therefore still often referred to locally as the "fairytale park". The park covers an area of 30 hectares.

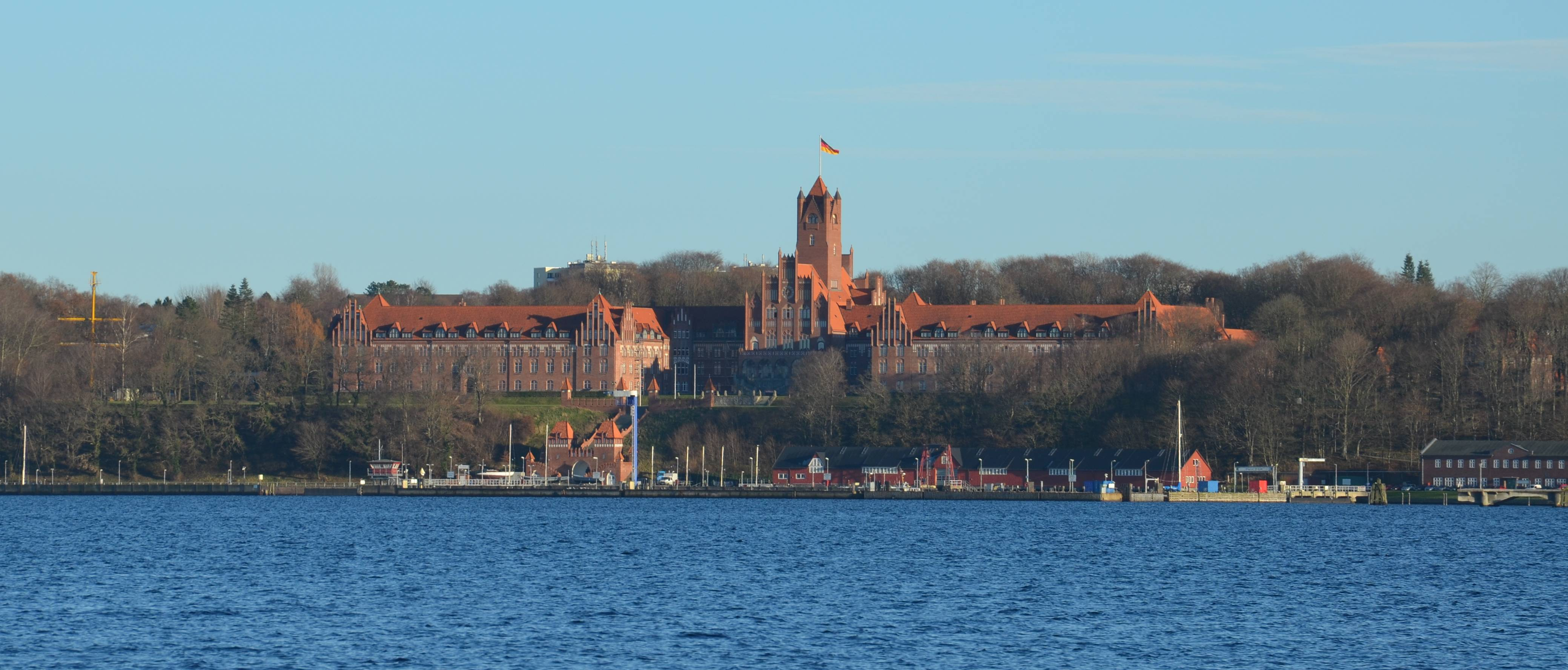
Naval Academy Mürwik

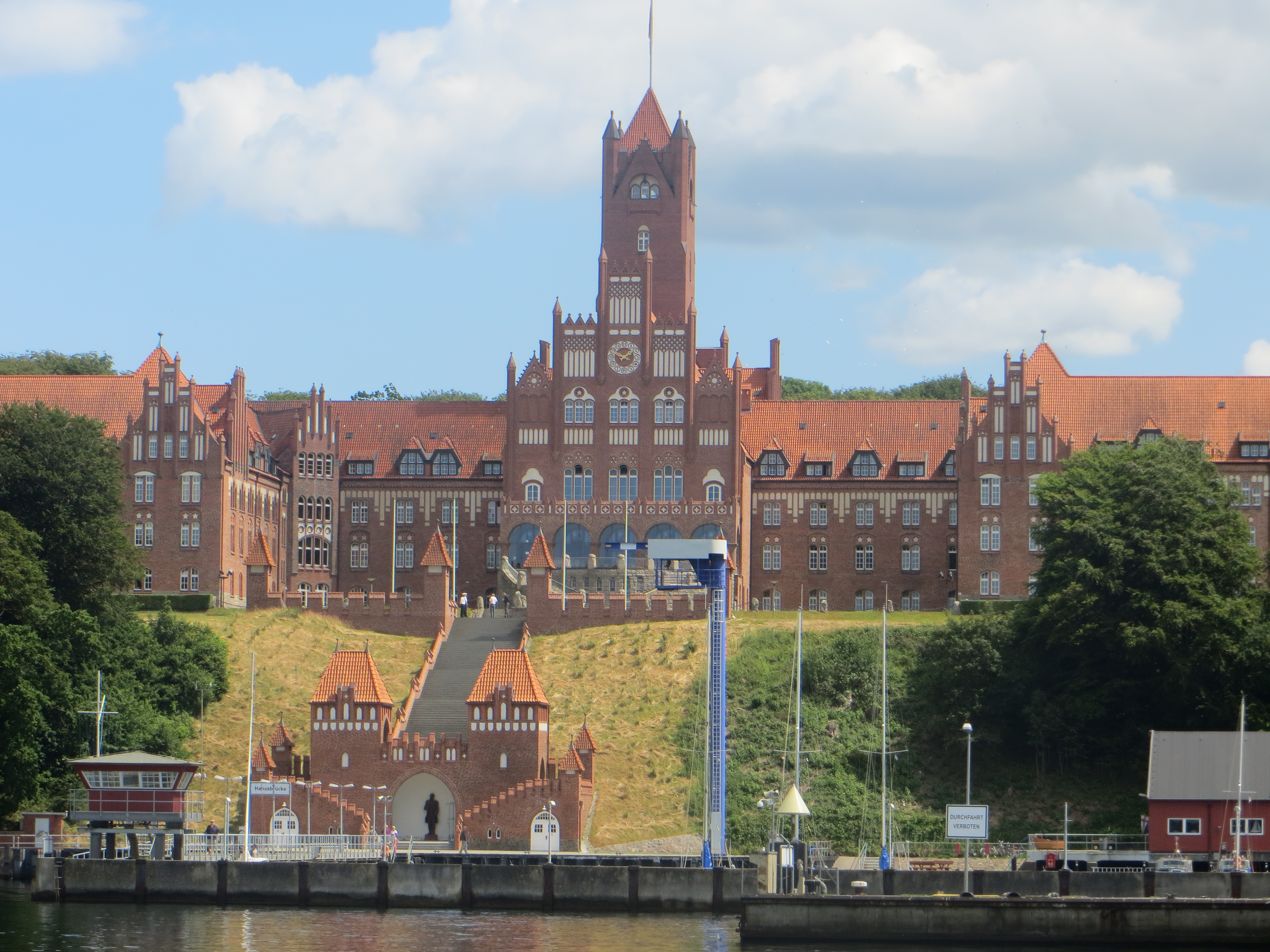
Naval Academy Mürwik

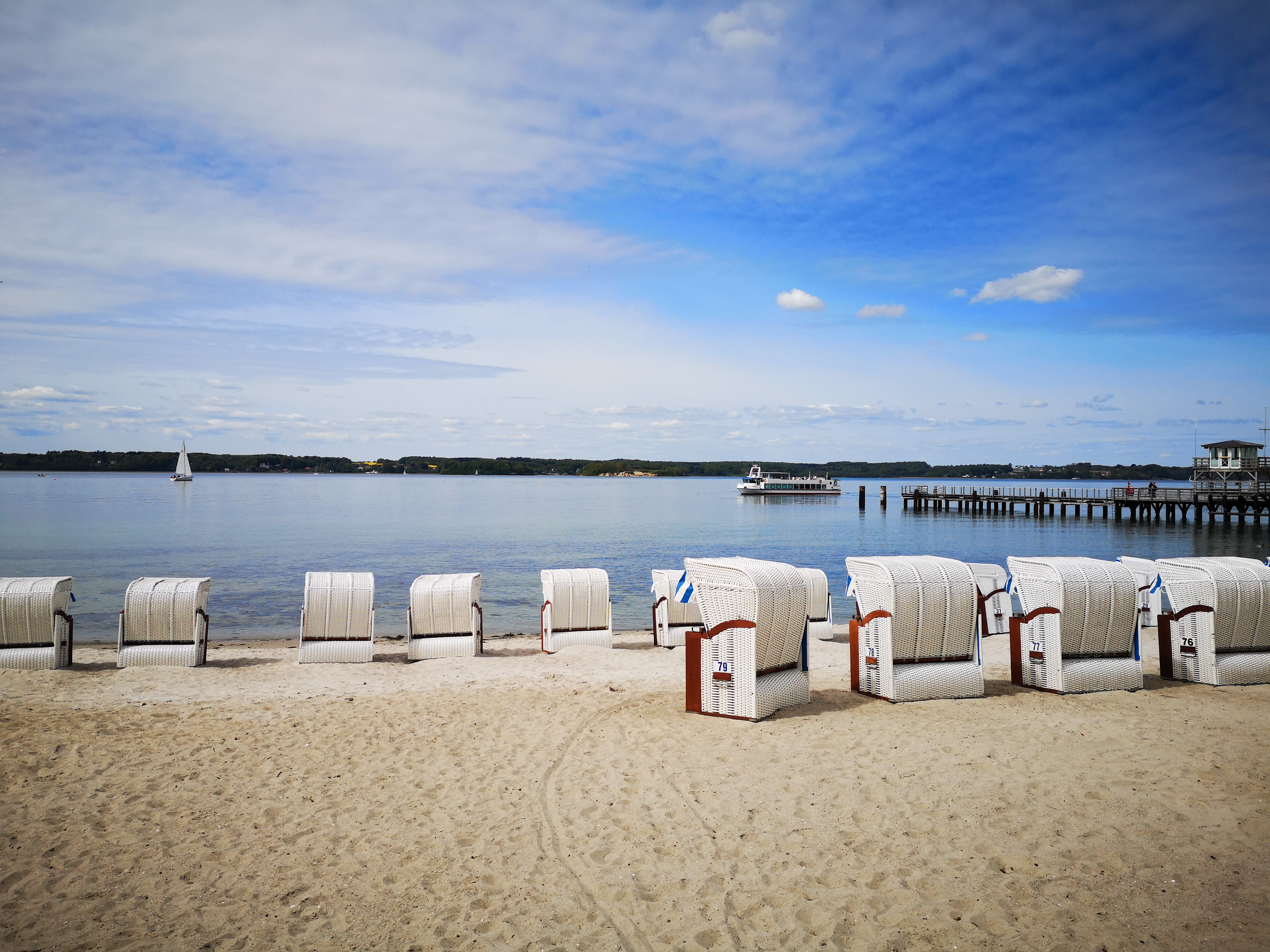
Glücksburg-Sandwig beach

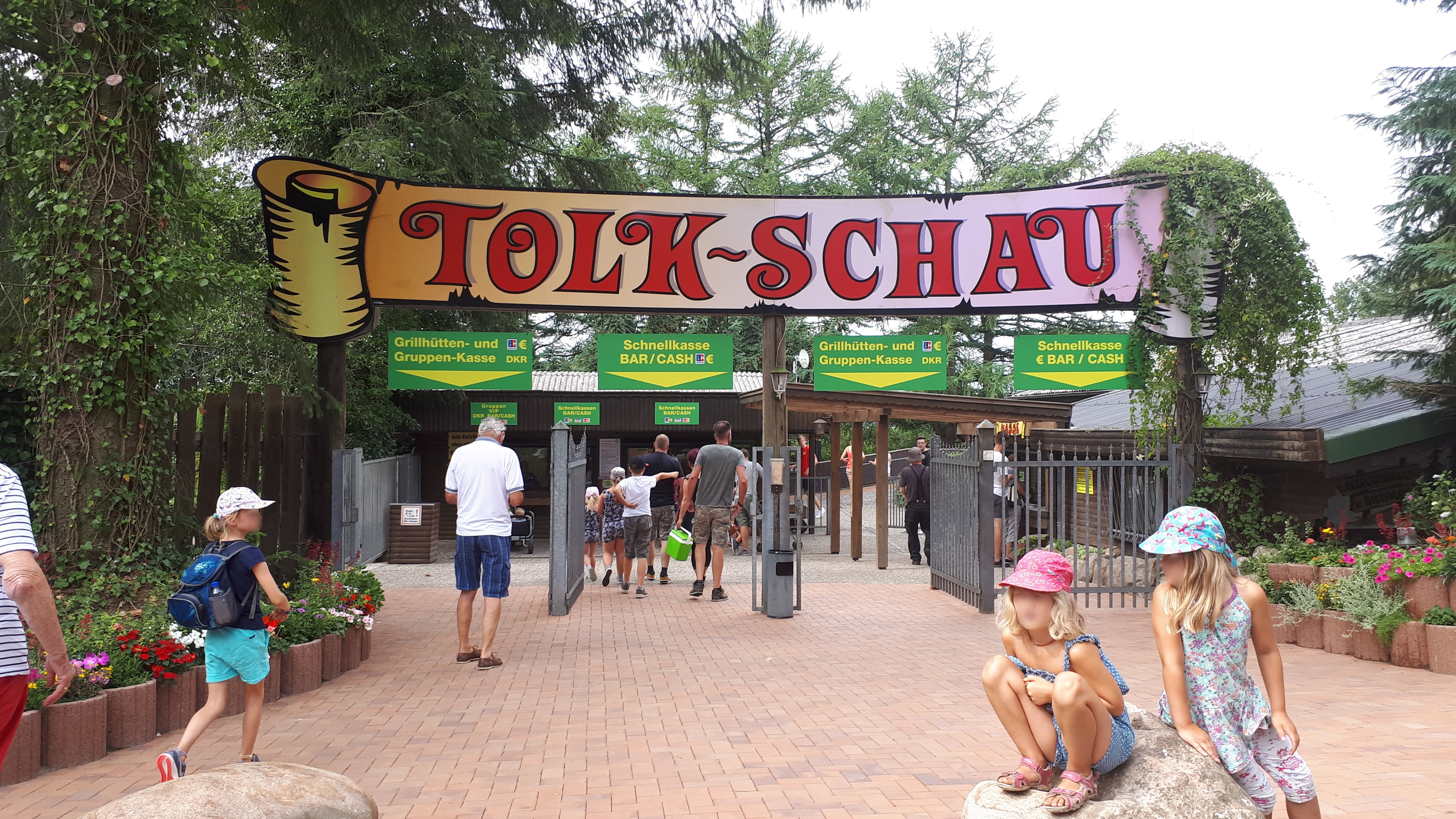
The entrance portal of the Tolk-Schau

== Architecture ==
=== Churches ===
The Angeln peninsula boasts an unusually high density of Romanesque churches dating from the 12th and early 13th centuries, most of which were built of fieldstone, but some of which were constructed of brick. This is the result of a building program undertaken by the Diocese of Lund, which aimed to provide the entire Angeln region with churches. The churches in Ulsnis and Sieverstedt are considered the oldest, those in Brodersby-Goltoft and Havetoft the most original, the one in Grundhof the largest, and the one in Sörup the most architecturally significant. Besides the fieldstone and brick churches, the churches built from precisely hewn granite blocks stand out, presumably constructed by craftsmen from the Schleswig Cathedral workshop. Typical features of the region include the nave, which in most churches is entered from the south side through the former men's entrance, and a chancel that is lower (recessed) in comparison to the nave. Instead of stone church towers, which were added to some churches in later centuries, many Angeln churches still have freestanding bell towers called Glockenstapel, the oldest of which is preserved in Norderbrarup, or low wooden bell towers attached directly to the church. Glockenstapel (lit. 'bell stacks') are bell towers that are particularly common in the marshlands of Schleswig-Holstein, in Angeln, and in neighboring Denmark, as well as in parts of Sweden. These often wooden bell towers usually stand freely next to churches and are not structurally connected to them. They are generally shorter than typical church towers.

One of the most visited and famous churches in Angeln is Schleswig Cathedral. It houses the Bordesholm Passion Altarpiece (Bordesholmer Passionsaltar), also known as the Brüggemann Altarpiece (Brüggemannaltar), a 12.6 m (41.3 ft) high winged altarpiece crafted by Hans Brüggemann between 1514 and 1521. Originally the main altarpiece of the Bordesholm monastery church, it has stood in the choir of Schleswig Cathedral since 1666. This altarpiece, from the transitional period between the Late Gothic and Renaissance periods, is considered one of the most important altarpieces in Germany, both for its artistic design and its comprehensive iconographic program.

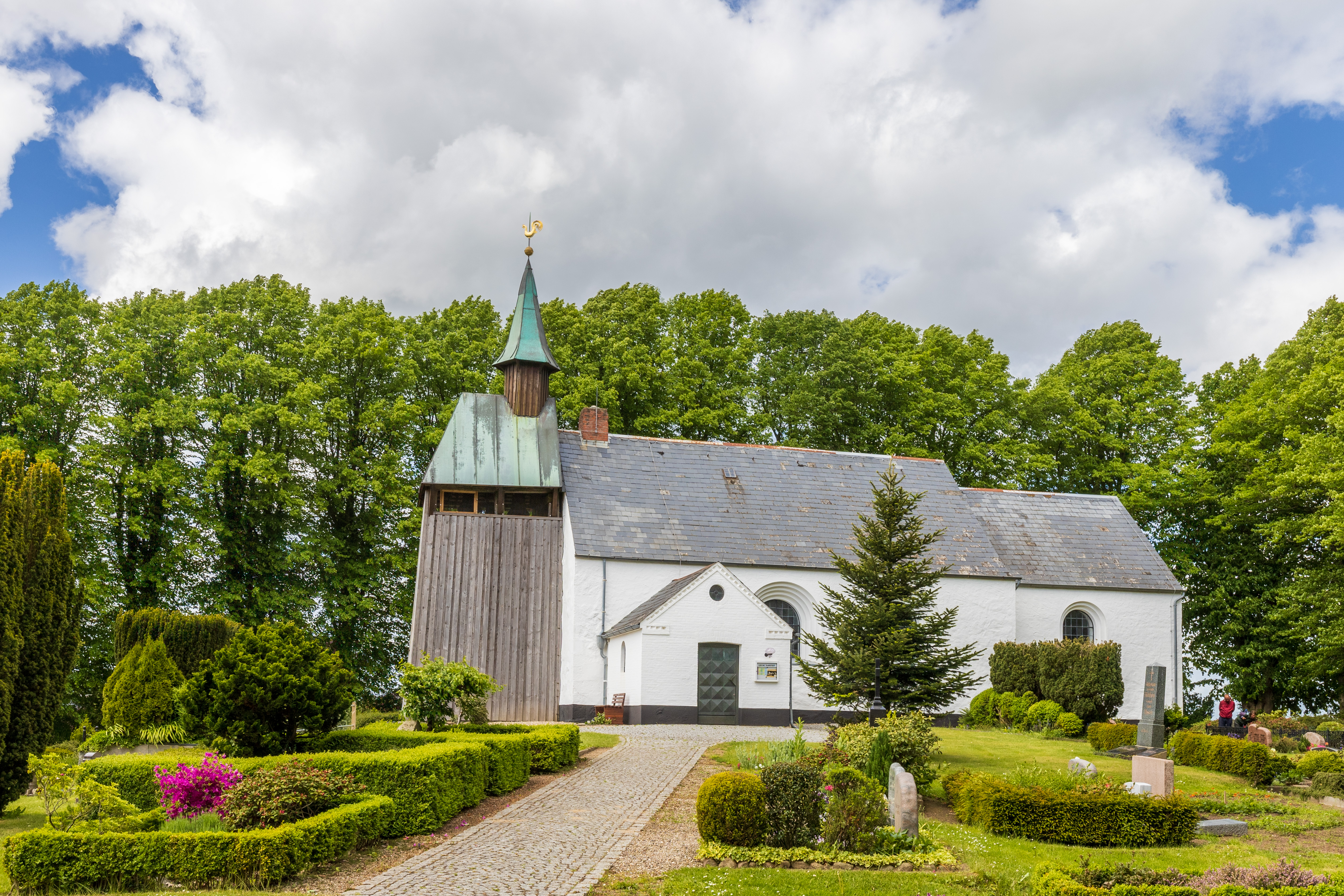
St.-Annen-Kirche, Taarstedt

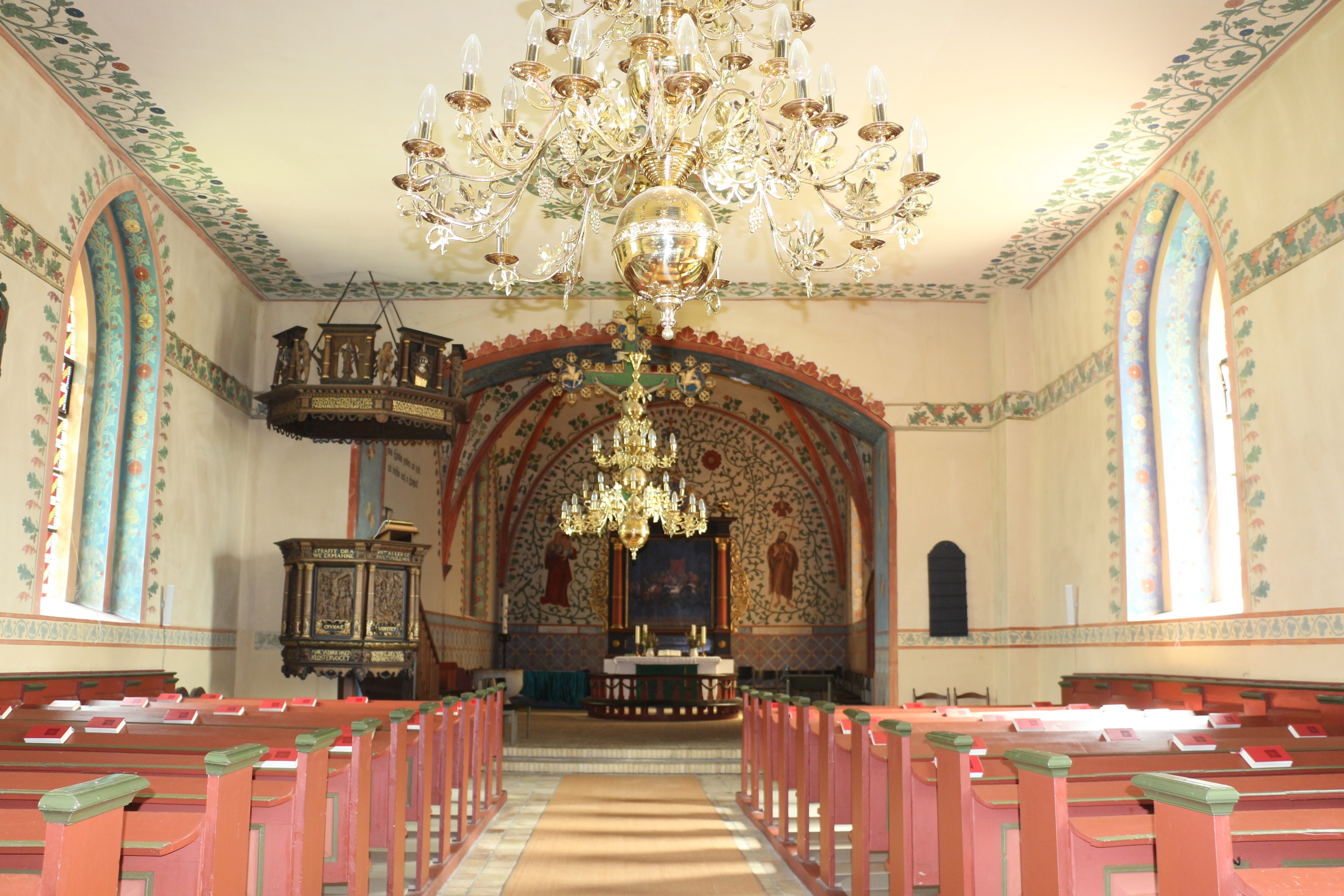
Interior of Marienkirche Schaalby-Kahleby

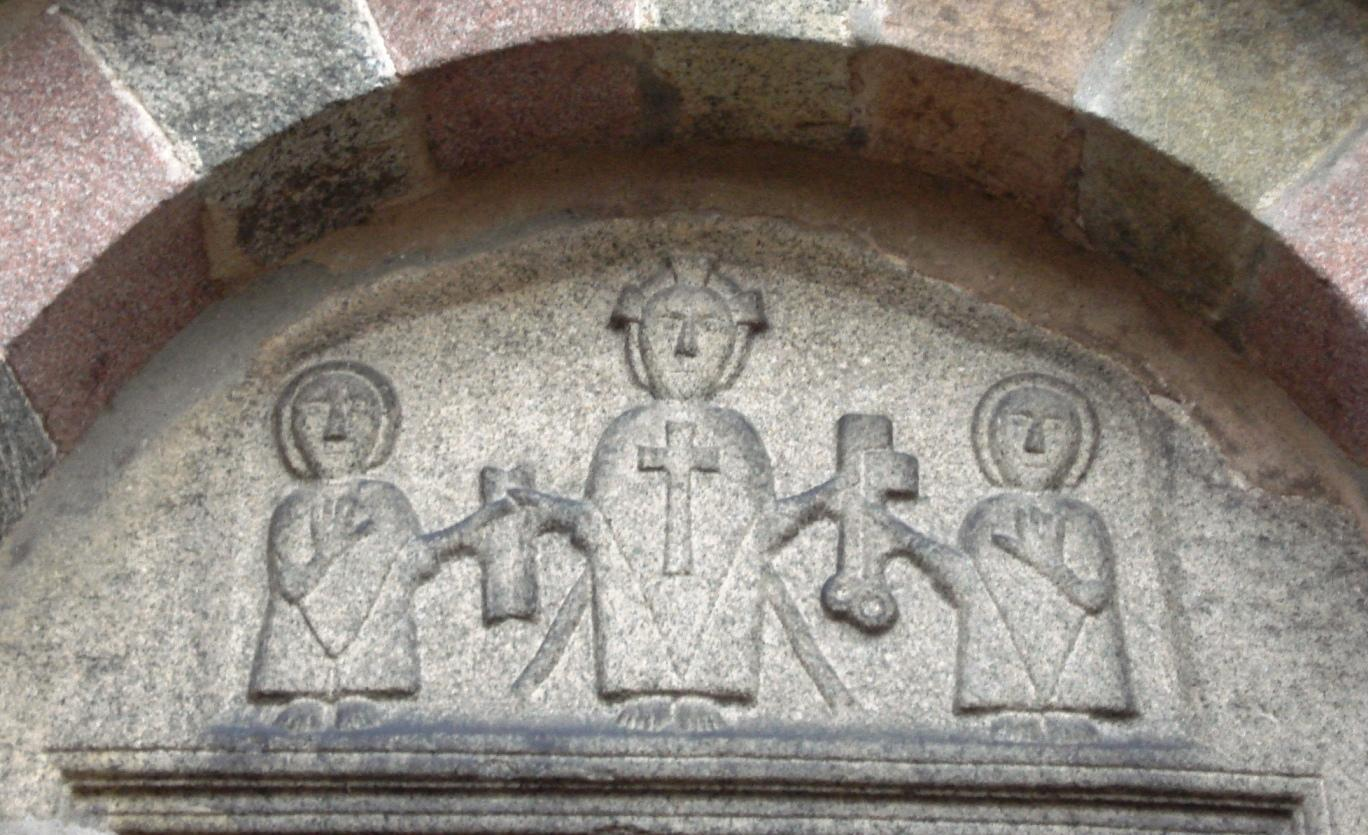
Detail above the portal of Marienkirche Sörup

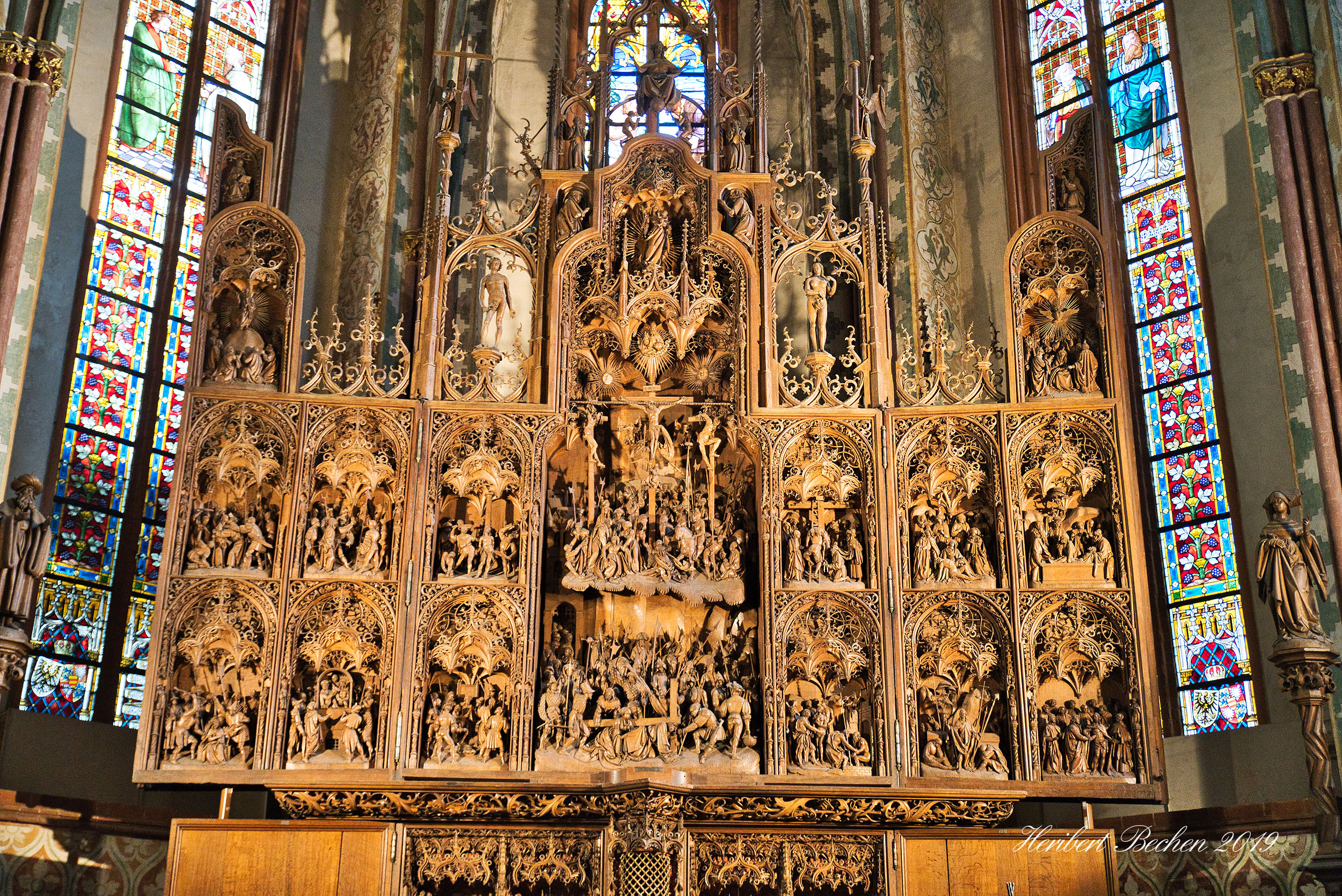
The Bordesholm Passion Altarpiece in Schleswig Cathedral

=== Castles ===
Gottorf Castle in Schleswig is one of the most important secular buildings in Schleswig-Holstein. Over its more than eight-hundred-year history, it has been rebuilt and expanded several times, transforming from a medieval castle to a Renaissance fortress and finally to a Baroque palace. It gave its name to the ducal House of Schleswig-Holstein-Gottorp, from which, among others, four Swedish kings (see House of Holstein-Gottorp (Swedish line)) and several Russian tsars (see House of Romanov) emerged in the 18th century. The castle was owned by the Danish royal family and the Dukes of Schleswig. After Denmark annexed the Gottorf portion of the Duchy of Schleswig in 1713, the castle served as the seat of the Royal Danish Governor of Schleswig, and subsequently as a barracks. Today, it houses two Schleswig-Holstein state museums as well as the Schleswig-Holstein State Museums Foundation. North of the castle, the Neuwerk Garden, one of the first Baroque terraced gardens in Northern Europe, has been reconstructed in recent years.

Glücksburg Castle is one of the most important Renaissance castles in Northern Europe; the moated castle is located in Glücksburg on the Flensburg Fjord and is one of the most famous sights in Schleswig-Holstein. It houses a museum and is open to visitors. Glücksburg served as the ancestral seat of the ducal lines of the House of Glücksburg; the family members are related to almost all European dynasties. For a time, the castle was the residence of the Danish royal family.

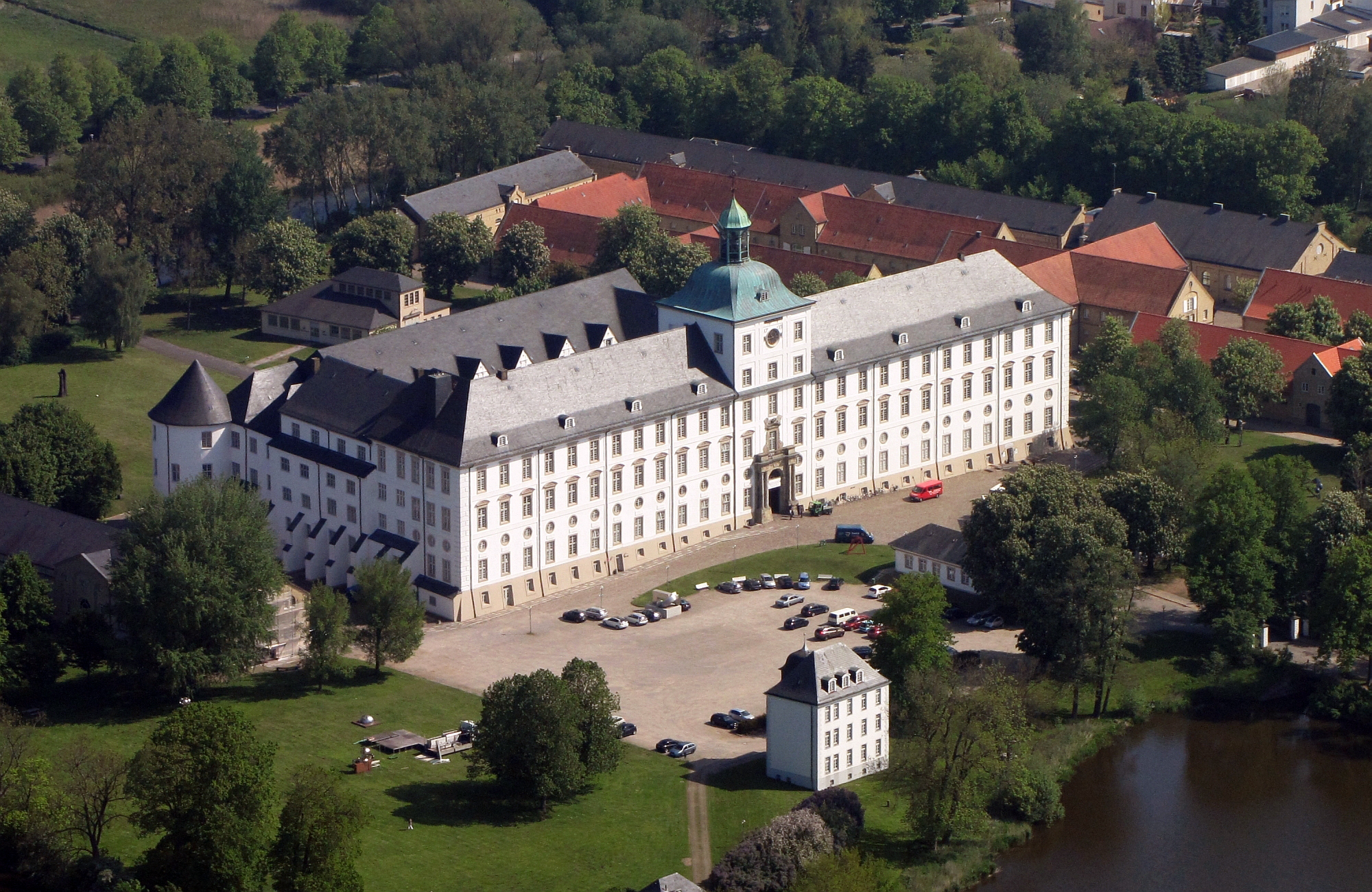
Gottorf Castle

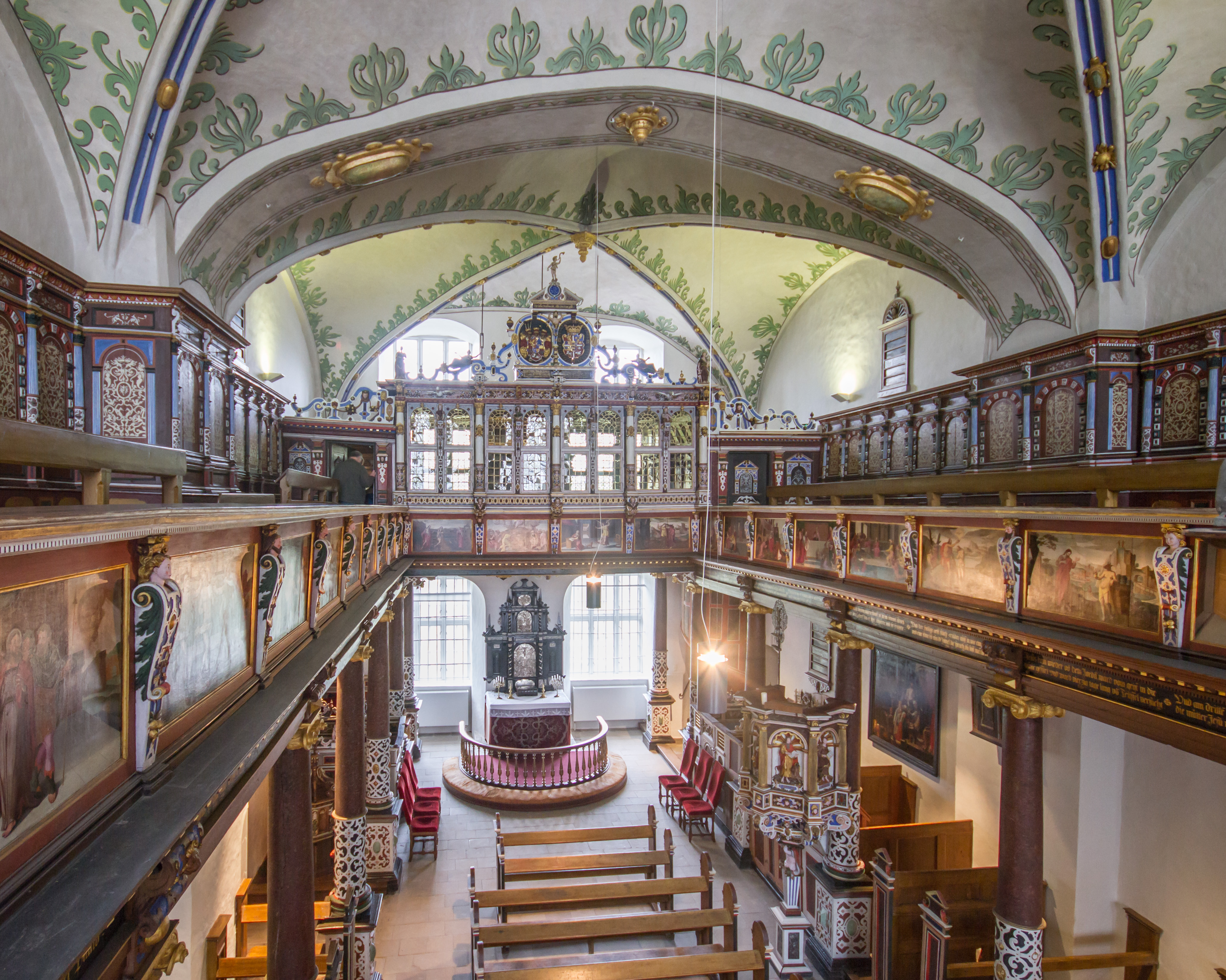
Castle chapel of Gottorf Castle

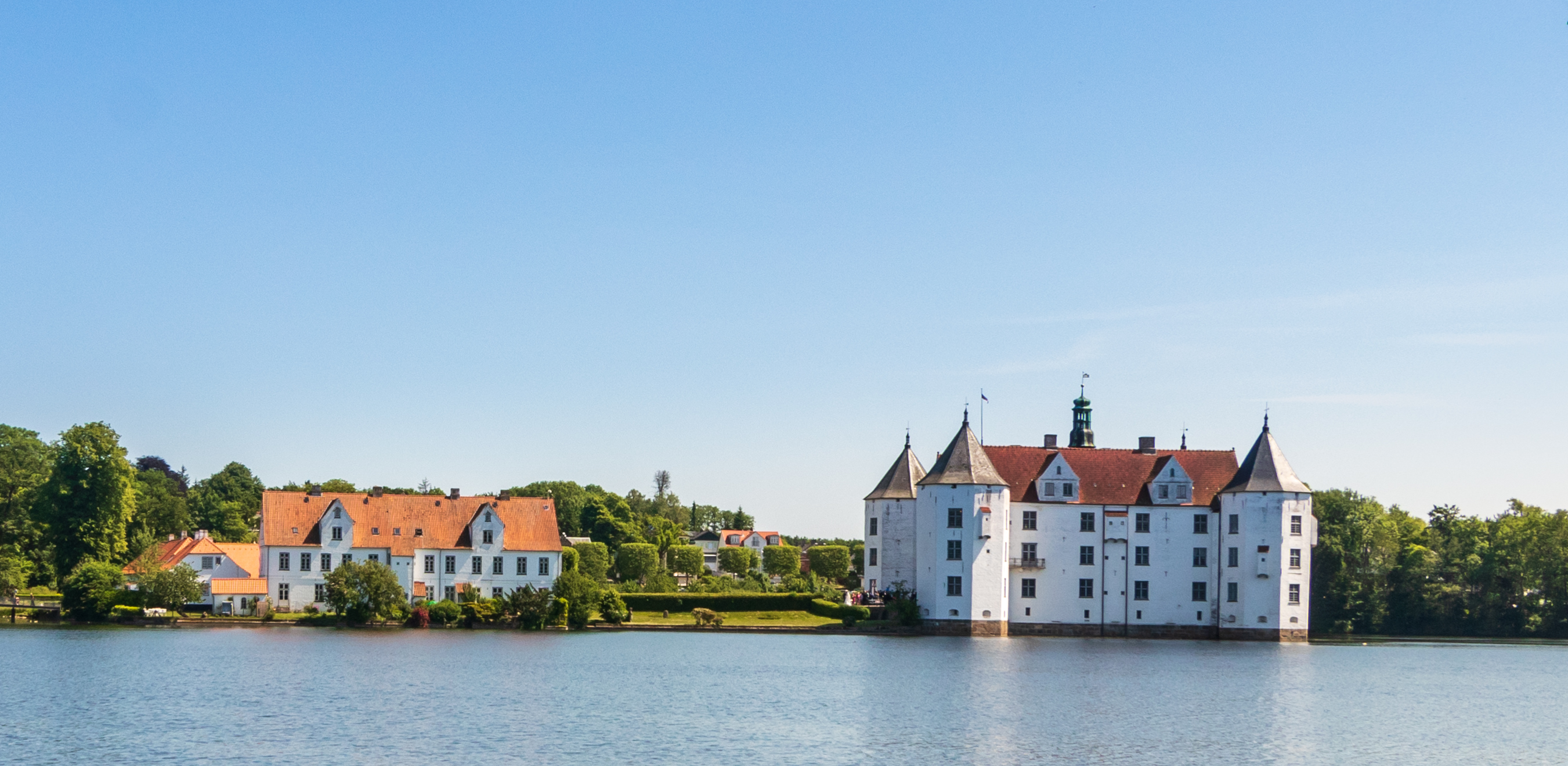
Glücksburg Castle

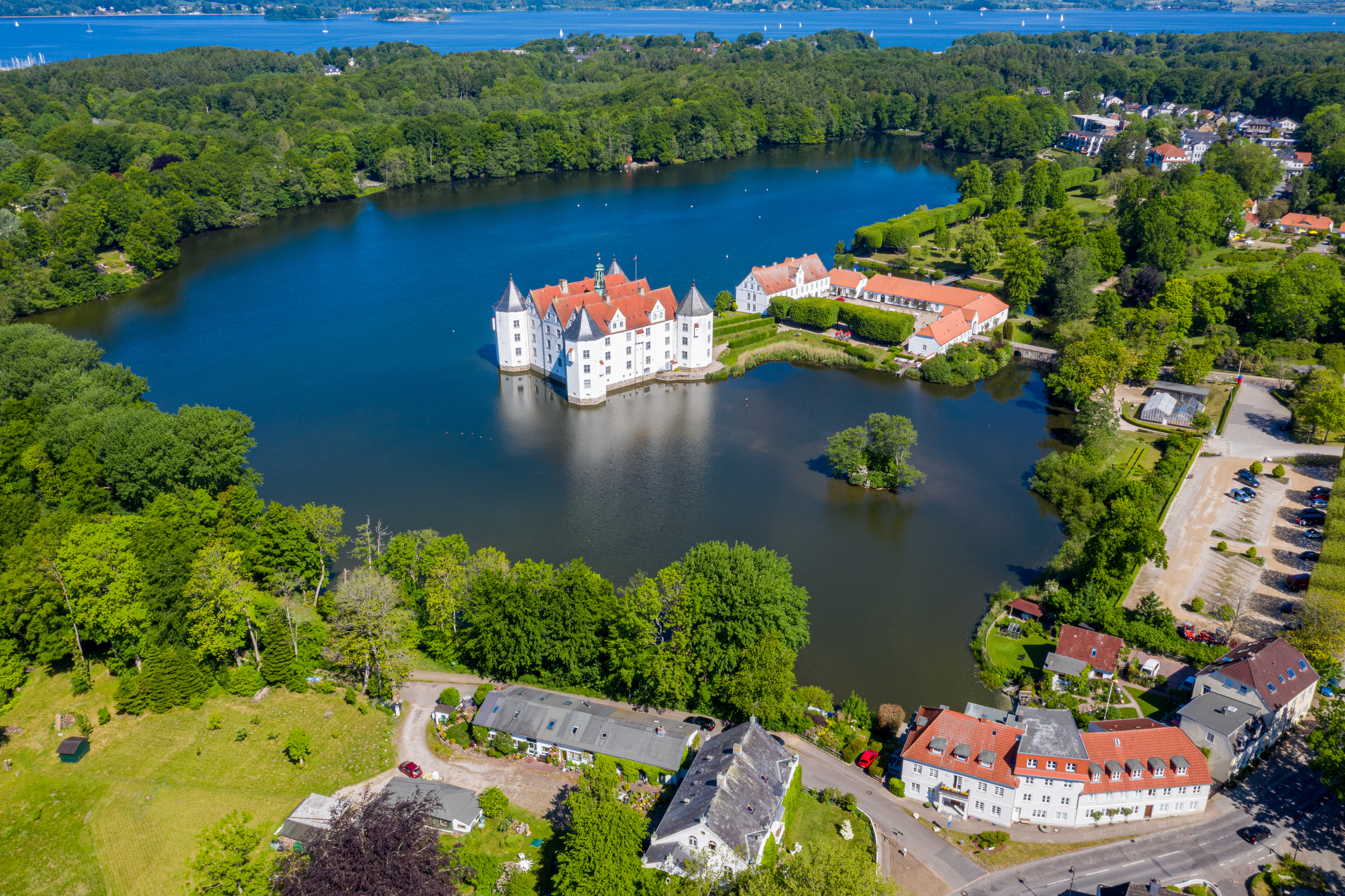
Glücksburg Castle

== Cultural peculiarities ==
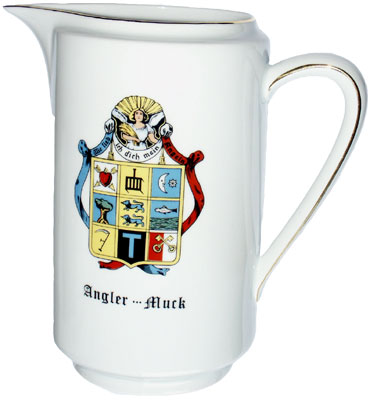
Angler Muck-Pott

Schüüsch is considered a typical dish from Angeln. Furthermore, the traditional Schleswig-Holstein dessert Mädchenröte (Maiden's Redness) originated in Angeln. Angler Muck, an alcoholic mixed drink, is a kind of "national drink" of Angeln. This beverage is traditionally served from the so-called Muck-Pott. Pott (pot) is a term originating from Low German, which is now also used colloquially in Standard German in Northern Germany. The original Angler Muck-Pott is made of porcelain and has a capacity of 1.5 liters. On one of the sides, the Angeln coat of arms can be seen in its original 1847 design. It is framed by a band in the Schleswig-Holstein colors (blue, white, red) with the inscription Wie lieb ich dich mein Angeln ("How I love you, my Angeln").

In Angeln, people used to have their own units of measurement for area called Skip (unit) and Haidscheffel. Grandfather clocks exist in Angeln in a typical Angeln style.

Angeln is also considered one of the traditional dress (tracht) regions of Schleswig-Holstein. The current Angeln costumes are based on models from the 19th century. The old Angeln saying "Rot und Grün ist Bauerntracht, wer es trägt, wird ausgelacht" ("Red and green are peasant dress, whoever wears it will be laughed at") describes the old, traditional clothing colours of the Anglians before fashions changed. The predominant costume colours are therefore red and green (see de:Schleswig-Holsteiner Trachten#Angeln).

Besides the ancient legends of King Offa, Beowulf, and King Sceafa, a large number of other legends exist. Common examples include fantastical explanations regarding the problem that the respective church of a place is located in an unfavorable location. It is claimed that God was asked for a sign before the church was built. One such common sign was said to be snow falling in a certain place in the middle of summer, so that the church was built there. Other legends tell of ghosts and castles, for example.

The North German Rummelpottlaufen (de) tradition is still very common in Angeln.

== See also ==
- Angles (tribe)
- Anglo-Saxons
- Angel Danish
- List of Germanic peoples
- Thorsberg moor
