= Zwickern =

German card game

Zwicker
- "A simpler and jollier version of Cassino"
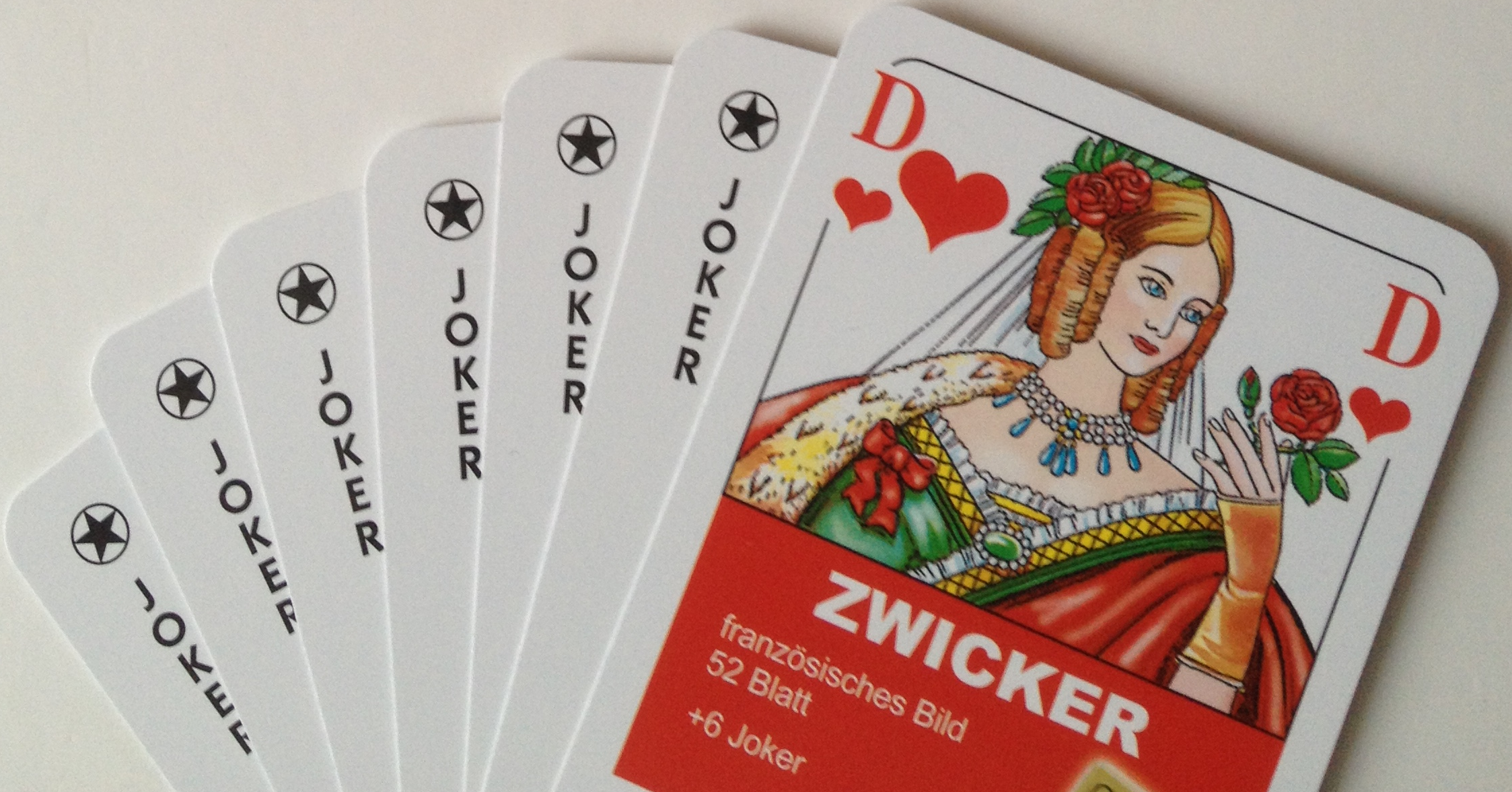
- A pack of Zwicker cards had 6 Jokers
- Origin: Holstein, Germany
- Alternative names: Zwickern, Zwickeln
- Type: Fishing
- Players: 2-8, 4 best
- Age range: 10+
- Cards: 58
- Deck: French + 6 Jokers, Zwicker pack
- Rank (high→low): K, Q, J, A, 10, 9, 8, 7, 6, 5, 4, 3, 2
- Play: Clockwise
- Playing time: 10–12 min/hand; 30–40 min/round

Related games
- Cassino • Scopa • Skwitz • Escoba
- Feature: employs up to 6 Jokers

Zwickern or Zwicker is a German fishing card game for two to eight players played in Schleswig-Holstein in North Germany. Its rules first appeared in 1930. It has been described as "a simpler and jollier version of Cassino", which is "exciting and entertaining" and easy to learn. German author, Hans Fallada, who learned it in while in jail at Neumünster, called it "a rather cunning farmer's game from Holstein." The feature that makes it unique among fishing games is its use of up to 6 Jokers.

== Names ==
Zwickern is the primary or only name given in most book sources and rule sets by playing card manufacturers, with only Mensing calling it Zwickeln and Grupp calling it Zwicker, while acknowledging Zwickern and Zwickeln as alternatives. Meanwhile, according to pagat.com, most players on the ground call the game Zwicker and the card packs produced for the game were also labelled Zwicker (see illustration). Another name is Zwick, named after the eponymous feat of sweeping the table, while Zwickel is also known. The names ending in "-n" are verbal nouns i.e. zwickern simply means "playing [the game of] Zwicker" and zwickeln means "playing [the game of] Zwickel." It should not be confused with the Austro-German gambling game of Zwicken.

== History ==
Zwicker's origins lie in the old English game of Cassino which is first recorded in a 1792 treatise, but spread rapidly to Germany and America. Cassino faded into obscurity in Europe in the late 19th century, but experienced a brief renaissance in America as new variants appeared. Zwicker probably emerged around the turn of the century, but is first recorded in Fritz Lau's 1918 work Elsbe where a character called Hans-Ohm loses 23 groschen playing "Zwickeln". Hans Fallada also recalls that, in 1928, he came across it as "a rather cunning farmer's game from Holstein played with 52 cards and a Joker". The earliest set of rules appeared in 1930 in Robert Hülsemann's Das Buch der Spiele where the game is much as described below in the variant without Jokers and looks very much like an elaboration of Royal Cassino. Originally, it was played with just a standard 52-card pack but now it is commonly played with 3, 4 or even 6 jokers. Special 58-card packs have been in production since at least the 1950s, but they now appear to be discontinued, the last manufacturer, NSV, no longer offering them in its range.

In 1935, the 52-card game (presumably without Jokers) was described as popular in Schleswig-Holstein, especially in the Holsteinish regions of Krempermarsch, Wilstermarsch and Dithmarschen as well as the Schleswigian regions of North Frisia and the Eiderstedt peninsula. It was almost never played for money, but usually for a glass of beer or a Grog. (Note: Grog is a traditional north German winter drink from East Frisia and Anglia comprising rum, sugar and water, stirred and brought to boiling point.) Dithmarschen may be where the game originated, but it must have spread and become widely popular in the region in order for special packs to be made for it.

In recent times, it has been played in North Frisia – for example, in Neukirchen, Leck and on the island of Sylt – as well as further east in the county of Schleswig-Flensburg at Sieverstedt Sillerup, Großenwiehe and Schafflund. It is still recorded in Holstein at Tappendorf and Windbergen, near its place of origin in Dithmarschen.

The game is very similar to Swedish Byggkasino.

== Jokers ==
Jokers were not originally used in this game, but it is now one of few games that is played with up to six in a single pack. From the 1950s, special Zwicker packs were manufactured for this purpose, initially by ASS Altenburger and, later, also by NSV. The latter firm made them until around 2020. Today they are no longer available and two packs of standard cards each of 3 Jokers with the same back designs are needed to play the versions with 4 to 6 Jokers. Where Jokers used, they play a major role in the game and are usually the most valuable counting cards. Much of the literature follows Hülsemann in allowing no Jokers; (Note: Danyliuk is a modern example.) in Grupp and Parlett they are optional; but in practice, all accounts by real players include the use of Jokers, albeit their values vary.

According to Grupp (1975), the normal rule is that, whether on the table or played from the hand, they are wild and represent any card chosen by the player. Optional rules to limit these powers include: if a Joker is the only card on the table, it may only be taken by another Joker; if a Joker is used in sweeping all cards from the table, it does not count as a zwick; or even that Jokers may never be picked up from the table, which effectively prevents any more zwicks being made. Parlett follows Grupp, but McLeod points out that no players in Schleswig-Holstein treat the Jokers as wild (Note: Nor deal unequal cards in the last round as Grupp also suggests.) and believes that Grupp invented the wild Joker rule to explain the Jokers in the pack.

In practice, players use at least 1 and up to 6 Jokers with various matching and scoring values – see below.

== Classic Zwicker ==
Zwicker was originally played without Jokers and this classic version is still widely published albeit rarely played. The following rules are based on the game as originally described by Hülsemann (1930), but it has changed little since. Variations introduced by later authors are also indicated.

=== Card values ===
The matching values of the cards during play are as follows: King – 14, Queen – 13, Jack – 12, Ace – 11 and pip cards – face value.

=== Aim ===
The ♦10 or Cardinale brings in the most points in classic Zwicker

The aim is to capture Aces and Honours (Honneurs i.e. ♦7, ♠7, ♦10) and to make 'sweeps' usually known as zwicks but occasionally as zwickers. The ♦10 is sometimes called the 'cardinal' (Cardinale or Kardinalblatt).

=== Playing ===
There may be from two to twelve players, each playing alone. (Note: Only Hülsemann suggests as many as 12 can play; modern sources, e.g. Danyliuk, put the limit at 8; others just say that more than four must use two packs (e.g. Dietze).) If more than four play, two packs are used. Players cut the pack and the player with the lowest card deals first. Deal and play are clockwise. The dealer shuffles and deals four cards to each player, one by one and beginning with forehand to the left and then four face up to the layout or tableau (Bild) on the table. (Note: Pagat.com calls it the "Picture", which is a literal translation of Bild, and Parlett simply calls them "table cards".) (Note: While 4 cards per player and 4 to the table works for 1 pack and 2, 3 or 4 players, it breaks down for larger numbers, but no source gives an alternative. For 6, 8 and 12 players, doubling the table cards to 8 solves the problem; for other numbers, players have to work out their own system.) The rest form the stock which is placed face down on the table to one side.

In turn each player plays a hand card and may use it to capture cards from the table. A player may capture table cards either by 'matching', where the value of a hand card is equal to one or more on the table, or by 'summing' if the value of a hand card equals that of two or more cards on the table. For example, a King (card value 14) may capture a 9 and a 5 (together worth 14). A played card may make as many captures as possible. So a Queen can be used to take two Queens from the table and, if the two remaining cards together add up to 13 (the value of a Queen), they may also be collected. If a player clears all the cards on the table, as in the last example, it is a Zwick which scores bonus points when it comes to scoring. (Note: NSV's rules call this a Zwicker but this is probably an error as all other sources call it a Zwick.) The captured trick always includes the hand card played and is placed in a face down trick pile in front of the player. For each Zwick, one card of that trick is turned face up as a record. (Note: Hülsemann does not say how tricks are handled, but this is the usual rule e.g. see Grupp (1976/86) or pagat.com.) When all the players have used up their hand cards, the dealer deals four new cards to each player. A player who cannot capture a card or cards from the table, must 'trail', by adding a hand card to the table, or 'build', by placing it partly over an existing table card to increase its value. For example, a 4 may be built on a 7 to increase its value to 11 i.e. the build pile effectively becomes an Ace. Builds may be further added to, but the value of the pile must not exceed 14. Cards placed one on top of the other can only be taken using their combined value.

=== Scoring ===
Once all the cards have been used up, the round ends. If there are any cards left over on the table, they are taken by the player who took the last trick, but this does not count as a Zwick. The winner is the player who has the most points. Points are awarded for taking the most cards, for the capture of certain cards and for taking Zwicks. Scoring is as follows:

Classic Zwicker
Card captured	Scoring value	Feat	Scoring value
♦10	10 points	Each Zwick taken	3 points
♦7	1 point	Most cards taken	1 point
♠7	1 point		
Each Ace	2 points		

Excluding Zwicks there are thus 21 points in single pack or 41 in a double pack.

=== Variations ===
The rules for classic Zwicker have remained remarkably stable with only minor variations. The most detailed later rules are by Grupp. He states that Zwicker was originally played without Jokers but now (1976/86) was mostly played with six. His variations include: players draw cards for first dealer and the highest card wins. A Zwick may be marked either by turning one card over or by placing it at right angles to the rest. Players may set a target score and whoever reaches it first wins; or when they take a break, the player with the lowest score buys a round of beer.

Dietze (1990) introduces two problematic rules. First, builds are not fixed at their new value, but the cards making up the build may be captured individually. However, this negates the point of the build, since it is effectively no different from trailing a card to the table. Second, the tableau must be maintained at a minimum of 4 cards. For example, after a Zwick the next player must lay all 4 hand cards down as the new tableau; if that player has fewer than 4, the following player(s) must lay cards down to bring the tableau back up to 4 or, failing that, cards are taken from stock. However, this appears to be contradicted by the rule that a Zwick is achieved when a player sweeps the entire tableau "whether it consists of one or more cards".

Other deviations from the normal rule that, after a Zwick the next player trails a card, include: the Zwick player trails a card (Note: NSV and kartenspiele.net.) or that all players lay a card each to start a new tableau.

== Zwicker with Jokers ==
Accounts of people actually playing Zwicker, as opposed to rule books, invariably involve Jokers. This feature is recorded as early as 1928 and distinguishes Zwicker from all other games of the fishing family. Zwicker with Jokers is more complex and challenging than its classic predecessor. The following two versions are recorded by John McLeod and are known to have been actually played. In both cases cards may be built up or down e.g. a player may play a 3 onto a 7 and say "4" or "10". Otherwise the 2 variants have the following differences in matching values and scoring:

=== Dithmarschen Zwicker ===
In this variant for four players in 2 teams of two, 6 Jokers are used with three different matching and scoring levels. Which pattern of Joker represents which level (large, medium or small) must be pre-agreed. The value of the ♦10 is scaled down. Aces and court cards may have either of two matching values chosen by the player when a card is used in a build or capture.

Matching values

- King – 4 or 14, Queen – 3 or 13, Jack – 2 or 12, Ace – 1 or 11, pip cards – face value.
- Jokers: small Jokers – 15, middle Jokers – 20, large Jokers – 25.

Deal and play

The game is played clockwise. The first dealer, after being selected at random, shuffles and offers to the right for cutting, before dealing four cards each and three to the table, face up. Forehand (left of dealer) opens by playing a card to the table, using it to build, capture or trail. Once all hand cards are exhausted the dealer deals four more cards each and the round continues in this way except that the last deal comprises five cards each.

As in classic Zwicker, players may build, capture or trail. Multiple captures may be made, but there is no obligation to capture anything nor to make all possible captures. By agreement partners may point out possible captures. In capturing multiple cards, values may only be added. So a 9 and 3 may be captured by a Jack (9 + 3), but not a 6 (9 – 3). Clearing the table of cards is a zwick; the cards captured are placed face up as a single trick to record it. If there are cards left on the table after the last card is played, they are taken by the team that made the last capture. This does not count as a zwick unless the last play validly captures all the table cards.

Players may build up or down on existing table cards, announcing the total e.g. a 3 may be played on a 9 and the player may announce "6" or "12" as desired. However, the player must hold a card of that value or, the partner must already have declared a build at that value. A single card build may be announced e.g. a Queen may be played and announced as "3" if the player has a Queen or 3 in hand. Builds need not be captured straight away and may be further built on as long as a card is held matching the new total. Separate table cards or piles may not be combined to make a build. A card of the same value as the table card or pile may be built on it without changing its value e.g. a 10 may be built on a 6+4 and announced as "10". Builds may be captured as if they were a single card.

Scoring

At the end of play, each team scores points as follows:

Dithmarschen Zwicker (3 Jokers)
Card or feat	Scoring value	Card or feat	Scoring value
Large Joker	7 points	♠10	1 point
Middle Joker	6 points	♠2	1 point
Small Joker	5 points	Ace	1 point
♦10	3 points	Each Zwick taken	1 point
Taking most cards	3 points		

Teams may agree a target score or decide the winner based on the higher number of points scored over a number of hands. There is a total of 30 points per game excluding Zwicks.

=== Grossenwiehe Zwicker ===
In this variant, which is known in Sillerup and Großenwiehe, the dealer gives 2 cards to each player, then 5 face up to the table; then 2 more to each player and finally 5 more to the table, so that the game starts with ten cards on the table. All 6 Jokers are used, each with a different matching and scoring value. Again, the value of the ♦10 is reduced.

Matching values

- King – 4 or 14, Queen – 3 or 13, Jack – 2 or 12, Ace – 1 or 11.
- Six Jokers with individual values: (Note: The matching values of these Jokers are handwritten at the top of each card; their scoring values are written at the bottom of the card.) 30, 25, 22, 20, 17, 15.

Scoring

Grossenwiehe Zwicker (6 Jokers)
Card or feat	Scoring value	Card or feat	Scoring value
30-Joker	20 points	Taking most cards	3 points
25-Joker	15 points	♣10	1 point
22-Joker	12 points	♠10	1 point
20-Joker	10 points	♥10	1 point
17-Joker	7 points	♠2 (the Pingel (Note: i.e. the "Little Bell".))	1 point
15-Joker	5 points	Ace	1 point
♦10	3 points	Each Zwick taken	1 point

The player with the most points over several deals wins. There is a total of 83 points per deal, excluding Zwicks. In the event of a tie for most cards, the card points are not awarded and the total is 80 points.

== Literature ==
- Crepon, Tom (1998). Kurzes Leben – Langes Sterben: Hans Fallada in Mecklenburg (in German). Hinstorff. ISBN 978-3-3560-0797-8.
- Danyliuk, Rita (2017). 1x1 der Kartenspiele (in German) (19th ed.). Hanover: Humboldt. ISBN 978-3-86910-367-9.
- Dietze, Rudolf (1990). Das neue Spielbuch (in German) (3rd ed.). Berline: Tribüne. ISBN 3-7303-0504-2.
- Eaton, Paul (2023). "Playing the Game: Zwicker – a North Sea fishing game". The Playing-Card. 52 (1): 15–28. ISSN 1752-671X.
- Fallada, Hans (2013) [First published 1943]. Heute bei uns zu Haus (3rd ed.). Aufbau Taschenbuch. ISBN 978-3-7466-2863-9.
- Grupp, Claus D. (1976/86). Schafkopf Doppelkopf (in German) Niedernhausern/Ts: Falken. ISBN 3-8068-2015-5
- Hülsemann, Robert (1930). Das Buch der Spiele für Familie und Gesellschaft (in German) (2nd expanded and improved ed.). Leipzig: Hesse & Becker.
- McLeod, John (1999). "Playing the Game: Zwickern" in The Playing Card, Vol. 27, No. 4, ed. Michael Cooper, Jan–Feb 1999. pp. 128-131.
- Mensing, Prof Otto (1935). Schleswig-Hosteinisches Wörterbuch (in German). Vol. 5, T–Z. Neumünster: Wachholtz.
- Parlett, David (2008). The Penguin Book of Card Games (3rd ed.). London: Penguin Books. pp. 405–406. ISBN 978-0-141-03787-5.
