= Tablanette =

Card game

- Origin: possibly Russia or the Balkans
- Alternative names: Tablanet, Tabinet, Tablić
- Type: Fishing
- Family: Matching
- Players: 2–4
- Skills: Tactics
- Cards: 52
- Deck: English pattern pack
- Play: Clockwise or counter-clockwise depending on region
- Playing time: 10-15 min.
- Chance: Medium

Related games
- Cassino • Skwitz • Zwickern

Tablanette, Tablanet, Tabinet or Tablić is a popular fishing-style card game usually played by two players or two teams of two that is popular in a wide area of the Balkans. It is similar to the English game of Cassino.

== History ==
The earliest known English rules by Phillips and Westall (1939) state that "Tablanette" is supposed to have originated from Russia, although Ulmann (1890) claims that "Tablanet" comes from "the Orient". The aim is to capture cards from a layout on the table, by playing a card from hand which matches in number a table card or the sum of several table cards. Another source claims the origin of the game is likely to be from North Macedonia, Serbia or Bosnia and Herzegovina. Table nette means "clean table" or "clear table" in French. The term first appears in connexion with a card game in the 1810 edition of Spielalmanach ("Games Almanac"), where it is a sweep in Cassino.

== Tablanette (1939) ==
The earliest English rules were published in 1939 by Hubert Phillips and B.C. Westall, and may be summarised as follows:

The game is for two players, the deal alternating. A 52-card, French-suited pack is used; (Note: Phillips and Westall are not explicit, but their rules require it.) the one cutting the lowest card deals first. Each player receives six cards and four more are dealt, face up, to the table. Elder hand (non-dealer) begins by playing a card to the table and may capture all table cards of the same rank as the one played and all combinations of table cards whose combined value equals that of the played card. For that purpose, pip cards are worth their face value, Kings are worth 14, Queens 13 and Aces either 1 or 11 as desired. If the played card cannot capture anything it joins the other table cards.

As an example, if the table cards are K 9 4 3 and a King is played, the King is taken. If a Queen is played, the 9 and 4 are taken. If the table cards are K 9 4 5 and a Nine is played, the 4 and 5 as well as the 9 are taken. The captured cards and capturing card are placed to one side by the player taking them. A player who sweeps the table card(s) announces "Tablanette!" and scores the total value of captured and capturing card. The opponent must then play a card to the table.

The Knave has the special privilege of always being able to capture all the table cards, but this does not score a tablanette. If a Knave is dealt to the table at the beginning it must be picked up and placed at the bottom of the stock before being replaced by another card. If a second Knave is also among the four table cards at the start, it is buried in the middle of stock and, again, replaced by another card. The Knave or Knaves dealt to the table are then replaced with another card or cards.

Once the players have exhausted their six hand cards, the dealer deals another six each until eventually the stock is exhausted and the last hand played out. Any cards left on the table at the end are taken by the player who last captured a card.

Players then calculate their scores, scoring 1 point for the ♣2 and for every Ace, King, Queen, Knave and Ten; 2 points for the ♦10; and 3 points for having the most cards. These points are combined with any for tablanettes to give a player's total score for the deal. Game is 251.

There is a three-hand variant in which four cards are dealt to each player.

== Tablanette (2011) ==
The rules published by Arnold (2011) are almost identical. All is as above with the following clarifications or alterations:

- The player drawing the highest card from the spread pack deals first (Aces high).
- Cards are dealt individually and alternately beginning with elder hand.
- A Jack (Knave) dealt to the table at the start is buried in the pack.

== Tablić ==
Tablić is a variant from Serbia and neighbouring countries with a number of significant differences; notably to the role of the Jack and the scoring scheme. In the description by John McLeod (2015), the main differences from Tablanette are as follows:

- The game is for 2 or 4 players. If four play, there are fixed partnerships; deal and play are anti-clockwise.
- When drawing for the deal, players decide beforehand whether the highest or lowest card wins. If highest wins, Aces are count as 11; if lowest wins, they count as 1. The remaining cards are ranked by their value in the game.
- The cut card is shown to the dealer who will get it in the last phase of the deal.
- The cutter may tap the pack instead of cutting, in which case the dealer shows the bottom card to everyone.
- Cards are dealt in threes.
- The Jack is valued at 12.
- Players may only capture separate combinations e.g. if the table cards are 2 3 4 7, a Nine may take the 2, 3 and 4 or the 2 and 7, but not both combinations since the 2 is in both. (Note: This is probably true of the rules for Tablanette, but neither author makes that clear.)
- Sweeping the table is a tabla and scores 1 point, except at the very end when it does not score.
- Otherwise scoring is as for Tablanette.
- If players tie for most cards, no point is scored.
- Every deal is played to the end.
- Game is 101.

McLeod describes a number of variations as well as a three-hand game.

== Tabinet ==
Tabinet is played in Romania to essentially the same rules as Serbian Tablić.

== See also ==
- Cassino
- Scopa

== Literature ==
- Arnold, Peter (2011). Chambers Card Games (2nd ed.). London: Chambers Harrap. ISBN 978-0550-10179-2.
- Parlett, David (2008). The Penguin Book of Card Games, Penguin, London, pp. 417/418. ISBN 978-0-141-03787-5
- Phillips, Hubert; Westall, B.C. (1939). The Complete Book of Card Games. London: Witherby.
- Australian National University (1998). Macedonian-English Dictionary. London: Routledge.
- Scarne, John (1983). Scarne's Encyclopedia of Card Games. New York: Harper & Row, pp. 378-379. Copied from Phillips.
- Ulmann, S. (1890). Das Buch der Familienspiele. Vienna, Munich and Pest: A. Hartleben.
- von Abenstein, G.W. (1810). Spielalmanach für Karten-, Schach-, Bret-, Billard-, Kegel- und Ball-Spieler. Berlin: Gottfr. Hayn.
