= Escopa =

Brazilian playing card game

- Seven of Diamonds (Sete Belo or Guindis)
- Origin: Brazil
- Alternative name: Escopa de 15
- Type: Fishing
- Players: 2 - 4
- Cards: 40
- Deck: French, Italian or Spanish
- Rank (high→low): K Q J 7 6 5 4 3 2 A
- Play: Anticlockwise

Related games
- Escoba • Scopa di Quindici

Escopa is the Brazilian variant of the Italian national card game of Scopa that was brought to Brazil by Italian immigrants. Escopa has elements of Spanish Escoba and of the Portuguese Escova. All these games are related to the variant of Italian Scopa called Scopa di Quindici

Escopa is a fishing game where players aim to capture cards from the table in combination with a suitable hand card. It may be played by two, 3 or 4 players; if 4 play, two teams of 2 are formed.

== Etymology, history and culture ==
The name Escopa is a Portuguese word of Italian origin but has the same etymon as the Portuguese word escova. Like the original Italian word and ancestral game scopa, it means "broom".

Escopa was brought to Brazil by the first Italian immigrants and is thus much better known in São Paulo than in the other Brazilian states. It is very much a game of the botequims and bars rather than clubs and is usually played for beer, cigarettes, guaranás – seeds similar to coffee beans. Sometimes it is played such that the loser has to pay for tickets to a film or football match.

The game is recorded as early as 1951 in the Brazilian town of Cruz das Almas which is located inland of the local capital of Salvador. A US study reported that, one particular group "gathers regularly at the principal botequim, where drinks are sold and tables are available for card playing... there is considerable drinking and gambling. Most of the men spend the time they are here playing cards; one day they will play Truco, another day Bisca, another day Escopa."

== Cards ==
A standard pack of 52 French-suited cards is used from which the 8s, 9s, 10s and any Jokers are removed to leave 40 cards for the game. A Spanish or an Italian deck of 40 cards can also be used.

The card values during the game are as follows:

- King: 10;
- Queen: 9;
- Jack: 8;
- Seven to Ace: nominal value.

== Objective ==
The objective of the game is to score points for various feats by capturing table cards whose values add up to 15 in combination with the hand card played.

== Deal ==
Deal and play are anticlockwise, dealer going last. Dealer deals 3 cards each, in turn and face down, followed by 4 cards to the table, face up.

== Play ==
In turn, each player aims to capture as many table cards as possible by playing a hand card whose value, when combined with cards on the table, adds up to 15 or a multiple thereof. Captured cards are gathered and placed, face down next to the player, together with the hand card used to capture them. Lacking any suitable card, the player must trail a card, face up, to the table. When the first hand of 3 cards has been used, the deal rotates to the right and the next dealer deals 3 more each. This continues until the stock is exhausted.

If a player, in capturing cards, sweeps all the table cards, this is an escopa and earns a bonus point. To record this, a card in the player's or team's pile is faced if the trick sums to 15 or faces two cards if the adds up to 30.

Should the first four table cards of a game add up to 15 or 30, the dealer wins an escopa. (Note: Presumably the cards are gathered up by the dealer and the player to the right trails a card, but the source is silent on this point.)

The game follows the same procedure as Scopa di Quindici, but in the last round, the cards on the table must add up 10, 25, 40 or 55 points, otherwise there has been a mistake and the players or pairs must review their captured cards.

The player or pair who made a mistake loses the game and their opponent(s) score 6 points plus any points for escopas.

If there are no mistakes in the match, each player or pair duly counts their points.

== Scoring ==
Players or teams score game points as follows:

- Most cards: capturing the most cards: 1 point; or 2 if the losers have < 10 cards.
- Most diamonds: capturing the most diamonds: 1 point.
- Seven of diamonds (sete belo or guindis): taking the ♦7: 1 point.
- All sevens: taking all 4 sevens: 1 point.
- All diamonds: taking all 10 diamonds: 3 points.
- Each escopa: 1 point.

Game may be 11, 21 or 31 points.

== Variations ==
- The player with the most 7s (but not all four) earns 1 point; taking all four 7s earns an extra point.
- The player with the highest "primiera" score earns 1 point. For this purpose, the 7s are worth eleven points, the 6s eight points, the Aces six points and the rest their face value. A player must have at least one card in each suit to score for primiera.
- The rule about adding the cards in the last round of a game to see if they sum to 10, 25, 40 or 55 points, may be dropped.
- Scoring for all sevens, all diamonds and the double for most cards if the losers have <10 may be dropped.
- Game is 15 points and a match is 4 games.

== See also ==
- Escoba

== Bibliography ==
- De Almeida, J.B. Pereira (1975). "Escopa" in Enciclopédia de Jogos. Reveplasti. pp. 283–239.
- Dossena, Giampaolo (1988). Giochi di carte italiani. Milan (Italy): Mondorari. ISBN 978-8804317340.
- Pierson, Donald (1951). Cruz Das Almas: A Brazilian Village. US Interdepartmental Committee on Scientific and Cultural Cooperation.
- Pratola, Daniel J. (1952). Portuguese Words of Italian Origin. Berkeley: University of California.
