= Tabinet =

Tabinet may refer to:

- Poplin, or tabinet, a type of fabric
- Tablanette, or tabinet, a card game
