= Masters M50 discus world record progression =

Masters M50 discus world record progression is the progression of world record improvements of the discus M50 division of Masters athletics. Records must be set in properly conducted, official competitions under the standing IAAF rules unless modified by World Masters Athletics. The M50 division consists of male athletes who have reached the age of 50 but have not yet reached the age of 55, so exactly from their 50th birthday to the day before their 55th birthday. The M50 division throws a 1.5 kg implement.

Key

Incomplete information Pending

| Distance | Athlete | Nationality | Birthdate | Location | Date |
|---|---|---|---|---|---|
| 68.40 | Klaus Weiffenbach | Germany | 21.01.1945 | Medelby | 10.05.1997 |
| 65.30 | Al Oerter | United States | 19.09.1936 | | 28.12.1986 |
| 56.62 | Parry O'Brien | United States | 28.01.1932 | San Diego | 08.06.1985 |
| 54.92 | Carmelo Rado | Italy | 04.08.1933 | Asti | 25.06.1984 |
| 54.26 | Kauko Jouppila | Finland | 03.03.1921 | Kauhava | 05.08.1973 |
| 54.18 | Fortune Gordien | United States | 09.09.1922 | Walnut | 28.04.1973 |
