= Masters M55 discus world record progression =

Masters M55 discus world record progression is the progression of world record improvements of the discus M55 division of Masters athletics. Records must be set in properly conducted, official competitions under the standing IAAF rules unless modified by World Masters Athletics. The M55 division consists of male athletes who have reached the age of 55 but have not yet reached the age of 60, so exactly from their 55th birthday to the day before their 60th birthday. The M55 division throws a 1.5 kg implement.

Key

Incomplete information Pending

Distance	Athlete	Nationality	Birthdate	Location	Date
64.58	Klaus Liedtke	Germany	05.01.1941	Medelby	08.10.2000
59.00	Klaus Albers	Germany	12.01.1940	Loxstedt	11.06.1998
55.48	Wendell Palmer	United States	22.04.1932		05.06.1988
54.44	Larry Pratt	United States	01.07.1941	St. George	25.10.1996
53.98	Kauko Jouppila	Finland	03.03.1921		03.09.1977
53.78	Peter Speckens	Germany	28.05.1935	Eppstein	21.05.1991
52.24	Bertil Tallberg	Sweden	25.02.1932	Karlstad	26.09.1987
50.62	Karl Heinz Wendel	Germany	17.06.1930	Pinkafeld	22.08.1987
50.38	Pentti Saarikoski	Finland	13.01.1926		1981
49.20	Konstanty Maksimczyk	United Kingdom	10.06.1914	Bristol	06.06.1974
