= Masters M80 javelin throw world record progression =

Masters M80 javelin throw world record progression is the progression of world record improvements of the javelin throw M80 division of Masters athletics. Records must be set in properly conducted, official competitions under the standing IAAF rules unless modified by World Masters Athletics. The M80 division consists of male athletes who have reached the age of 80 but have not yet reached the age of 85, so exactly from their 80th birthday to the day before their 85th birthday. The M80 division throws a 400 g implement.

Key

Incomplete information Pending

Distance	Athlete	Nationality	Birthdate	Location	Date
45.85	Jouni Tenhu	Finland	30 April 1939	Caorle	9 September 2019
45.23	Jouni Tenhu	Finland	30 April 1939	Parikkala	8 June 2019
39.06	William Platts	United States	18 April 1928	St. George	7 October 2008
38.14	Heiner Will	Germany	22 October 1926	Medelby	10 June 2007
36.39	Erik Eriksson	Finland	14 August 1923	Arhus	30 July 2004
35.83	Viljo Kyyrö	Finland	24 May 1919	Harjavalta	21 August 1999
