= Byggkasino =

Card game

Byggkasino ("Build Casino") is a Swedish development of the old English card game of Casino. Like the latter, the aim of Byggkasino is to capture cards laid out on the table by matching them with cards in the hand that have corresponding numerical values.

The big difference between the two games is that, in Byggkasino, in addition to the options of picking up cards (by matching or summing) or trailing a card on the table, players also have the opportunity of 'building', which means that, in accordance with certain rules, you can form a combination of a hand card with one or more table cards. The resulting card combination or 'build' has a new fixed numerical value which is the sum of the card within it. The intention is that you should be able to take home these cards the next time it is your turn. Thus the game is similar to north German Zwicker.

Players receive points for the cards brought home, largely following the same rules as in Casino.
