= Mulle =

Card game

Mulle is a Swedish card game that has been developed from Byggkasino which, in turn, is a derived from the English fishing game of Casino. Mulle is a common game in Swedish prisons.

== Description ==
The aim of Mulle is to win cards that are laid face up on the table, by matching them with cards in one's hand with the corresponding numerical values. Two shuffled packs of cards are used. As in Casino, points are awarded for, among other things, certain counting cards; in addition, you get points for each mulle, that is, for a card taken using a card of the same denomination and suit.

== Bibliography ==
- Glimne, Dan (2016). Kortspelshandboken (3rd revised and expanded ed.). Stockholm: Känguru. pp. 86–88, 187–189, 237–239. ISBN 978-91-7663-115-7.
