= Schafflund (Amt) =

Collective municipality in Germany

- Amt
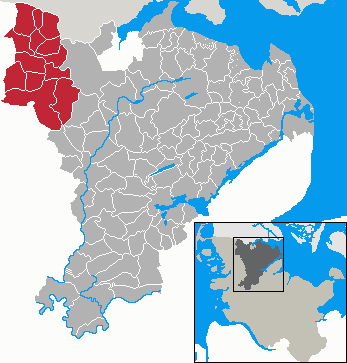
- Map of Schleswig-Flensburg highlighting Schafflund
- Interactive map of Schafflund
- Location within Germany Location within Schleswig-Holstein
- Coordinates: 54°46′N 9°10′E
- Country: Germany
- State: Schleswig-Holstein
- District: Schleswig-Flensburg
- Seat: Schafflund
- Subdivisions: 13 municipalities

Area
  - Total: 236.81 km^{2} (91.43 sq mi)

Population (2025-12-31)
  - Total: 13,539
  - Density: 57.172/km^{2} (148.08/sq mi)
- Time zone: UTC+01:00 (CET)
  - Summer (DST): UTC+02:00 (CEST)
- Vehicle registration: SL
- Website: www.amt-schafflund.de

Schafflund is an Amt ("collective municipality") in the district of Schleswig-Flensburg, in Schleswig-Holstein, Germany. The seat of the Amt is in Schafflund.

The Amt Schafflund consists of the following municipalities:

1. Böxlund
2. Großenwiehe
3. Hörup
4. Holt
5. Jardelund
6. Lindewitt
7. Medelby
8. Meyn
9. Nordhackstedt
10. Osterby
11. Schafflund
12. Wallsbüll
13. Weesby
