= Wallsbüll =

Wallsbüll Valsbøl
- Municipality
- Coat of arms

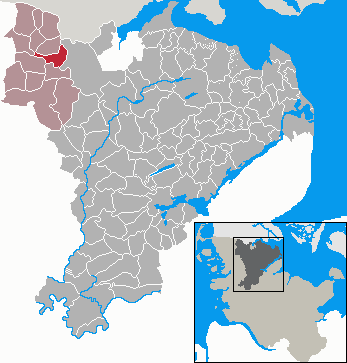
- Location of Wallsbüll; Valsbøl within Schleswig-Flensburg district
- Interactive map of Wallsbüll; Valsbøl
- Location within Germany Location within Schleswig-Holstein
- Coordinates: 54°46′N 9°13′E
- Country: Germany
- State: Schleswig-Holstein
- District: Schleswig-Flensburg
- Municipal assoc.: Schafflund

Government
  - Mayor: Werner Asmus

Area
  - Total: 13.23 km^{2} (5.11 sq mi)
- Elevation: 21 m (69 ft)

Population (2025-12-31)
  - Total: 979
  - Density: 74.0/km^{2} (192/sq mi)
- Time zone: UTC+01:00 (CET)
  - Summer (DST): UTC+02:00 (CEST)
- Postal codes: 24980
- Dialling codes: 04639
- Vehicle registration: SL
- Website: www.wallsbuell.de

Wallsbüll (Danish: Valsbøl) is a municipality in the district of Schleswig-Flensburg, in Schleswig-Holstein, Germany. Wallsbüll is located near Flensburg in the glacial valley of Wallsbek.
