= Escoba del 15 =

Variant of the Italian fishing card game Scopa

Escoba
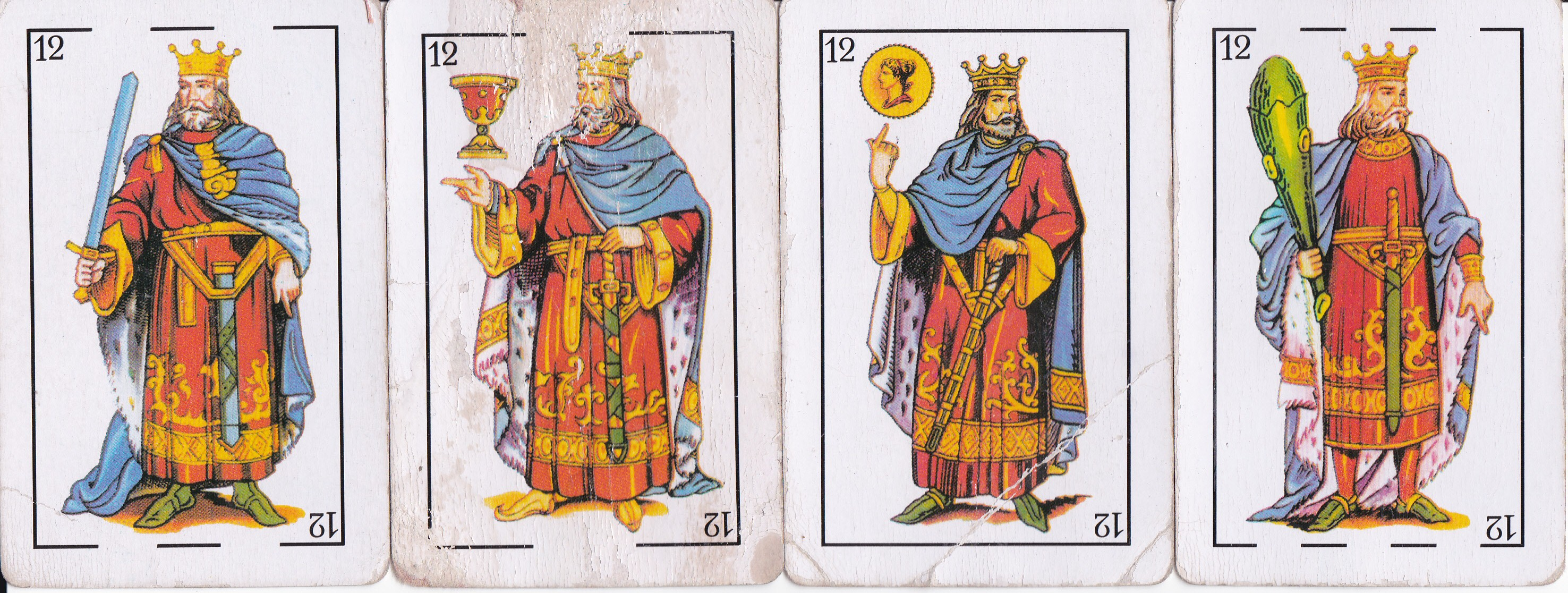
- The four Kings
- Origin: Spain
- Type: Fishing
- Players: 2-4
- Cards: 40
- Deck: Spanish
- Play: Anticlockwise
- Playing time: 20 min.

Related games
- Cassino • Scopa • Skwitz • Zwickern

Escoba del 15 or just Escoba, Escova and Escopa, is the Spanish and Portuguese variant of the Italian fishing card game Scopa, which means "broom", a name that refers to the situation in the game where all of the cards from the board are "swept" in one turn. The game is usually played with a deck of traditional Spanish playing cards, called naipes.

== Objective ==
The object of the game is to be the first player to score 21 points through capturing cards. Points are scored in a variety of ways as detailed below. It does not necessarily follow that the player with the most captured cards in any particular round will get the greatest score.

=== Deal ===
A traditional Spanish deck of 40 cards is used to play. For traditional decks which have 1 through 12 of each suit, the 8 and 9 of each suit must be removed, leaving 40 cards. A standard deck of playing cards (having Ace, 2-10, Jack, Queen, King) can be modified by removing the 8, 9, and 10 of every suit, leaving 40 cards. At the start of each round the dealer will deal three cards to each player, face down. After all the players have been dealt cards, four board cards are dealt, face up, in the center of the table, and play commences.

On rare occasions where the four initial cards dealt to the board add up to 15, they are taken by the dealer and added to his scoring pile.

=== Play ===
Play commences with the person to the right of the dealer. Each player in turn attempts to match one card from the hand with one or more cards on the board to produce a total of 15. When using a traditional deck, all cards are worth their face value except for the 10 sota (Jack or Page), 11 caballo (Horse) and the 12 rey (King), which are reduced in value to 8, 9 and 10, respectively. All cards matched, including the one from the player's hand, are removed from the board and placed in a scoring pile beside the player. A player unable to make a total of 15, must discard a hand card, adding it to the available cards in the centre of the table. After either scoring a hand or discarding, play then moves to the next player in anticlockwise order.

If a player can combine one hand card with all of the cards on the board to total 15, that player has scored an escoba, worth one additional point at the end of the round. Each escoba scored is typically noted by the player turning one card of their pile face up.

After players have exhausted their hands, the dealer will then deal a fresh hand of three cards each just as in the beginning of the round. The last hand in any particular round is the one which exhausts the deck. At the end of this round, the last player to have taken cards from the board receives any remaining cards regardless of their value. After this, the round is scored, and the deal progresses to the next player on the left.

=== Scoring ===
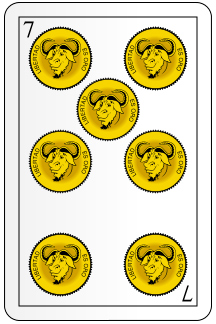
The 7 of Oros earns 1 point

Points are determined at the end of each round. Players score points based on the following categories:

- Most cards: The player with the most cards in their score pile gets one point.
- Most oros: The player with the most oros (coins) gets one point.
- Most sevens: The player with the most sevens gets one point.
- Seven of oros: The player with the seven of oros gets one point.
- All of the sevens: If a player has managed to capture all of the sevens, they get one additional point.
- All of the oros: If a player has managed to capture all of the oros, they get one additional point.
- Players also get one additional point for each escoba they have obtained.

If two or more players score the same in any category, none of them is awarded a point in that category, e.g., if two players each take 5 oros, neither scores a point. The first player to reach a score of 21 is declared the winner. If two players reach at least 21 on the same hand, the player with the most points wins. If there is a tie, play continues until the tie is broken.

== Variations ==
=== Escova ===
Escova [isˈkovɐ], also known as escopa, is the Brazilian variation of Scopa, very popular in the Brazilian State of Rio Grande do Sul.

==== Object ====
The game is played until someone reaches 31 points. These points are gained by completing objectives. When the deck cards are finished, each player counts their own points.

- Each escova = 1 point
- Having all diamond cards = 2 points
- Having the most diamond cards = 1 point
- Having the most cards = 1 point
- Having the sete belo (7♦) = 1 point

The sub-objective of escova is to get escovas and montinhos. To get an escova, the player must have a card that matches with all of the cards in the middle of the table to make 15, e.g., the cards on the table are 3♠ 2♣ 1♥ and 4♦ and Sara has a 5♠. If she adds 5+3+2+1+4, she will have 15. To get a montinho, a player must have a card that matches with any card on the middle of the table to make 15.

==== Deck ====
Escova is played with Spanish playing cards but can also be played with Anglo-American cards. If played with Anglo-American cards, the 8, 9 and the 10 should be removed. Escova has no coringas (jokers).

==== Card values ====
Most cards have the same value as their numbers. These cards are 2, 3, 4, 5, 6 and 7. The remaining cards have different values:

- Ace (as) = 1
- Jack (sota) = 8
- Horse (caballo) = 9
- King (rey) = 10

Since the special card in the Spanish 40 card deck is the caballo (horse) while there is no Queen, it is recommended to use the Queen for the caballo (horse) if no Spanish card deck is available.

==== Play ====
Each player receives three cards, and the other four cards go to the middle of the table, where all players can catch up. The player to the right of the one that shuffled the cards starts the game.

==== Layout ====
At the start of the game, there are four cards on the table. A player who does not have a card to make 15, places one of his cards in the middle of the table. When all of the players' cards have been played, a re-deal is made. When the stock is exhausted, the owner is the last player to get an escova or a montinho.

==== Diamonds ====
The diamond (♦) is the super-suit of escova. Players should try to collect a majority of diamond cards, especially the 7♦, called sete belo and worth 1 point.
