= Nürnberger-Spielkarten-Verlag =

German playing card manufacturer and board game publisher

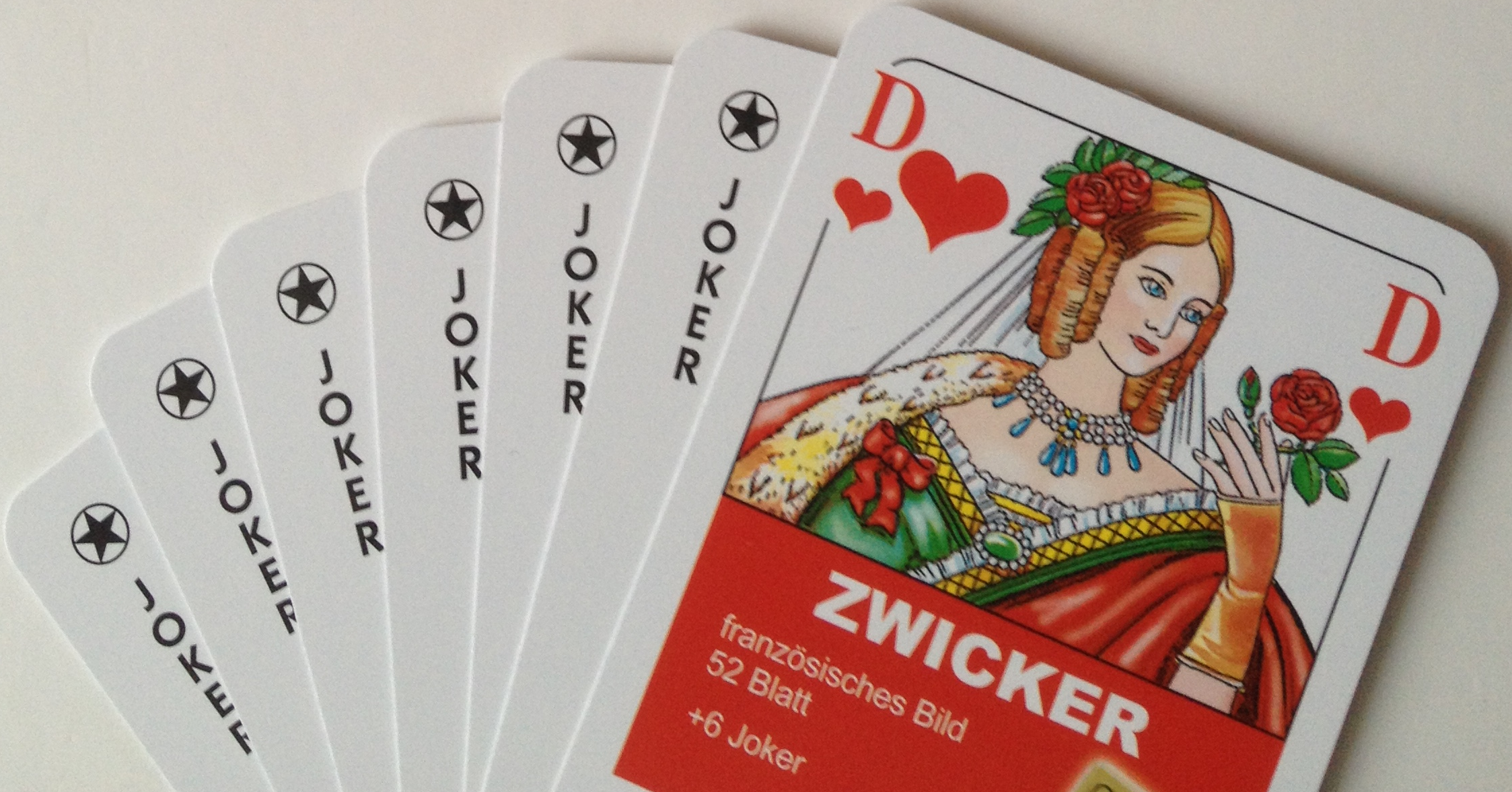
- Zwicker packs with 6 Jokers by NSV
- Company type: GmbH
- Founded: 1989
- Headquarters: Nuremberg, Germany
- Key people: Franz Jurthe (managing director)
- Products: playing cards, publishers
- Website: http://www.nsv.de/

Nürnberger-Spielkarten-Verlag (NSV) is a German playing card manufacturer and board game publisher based in Nuremberg. It was founded in 1989 after outsourcing from the publishing house of F.X. Schmid and builds on the "Heinrich Schwarz Playing Card Factory, Nuremberg" (Spielkartenfabrik Heinrich Schwarz Nürnberg) founded in 1948. The company produces playing cards and dice games and, especially in recent years, increasingly proprietary games from various game authors.

== History ==
NSV emerged from the Heinrich Schwarz's Playing Cards Factory in Nuremberg which he founded in 1948. In the early 1960s the company traded under the name "Heinrich Schwarz & Co" and was sold to Gisela Herfurth, who further developed and expanded the company as Nürnberger Spielkarten GmbH with the label "Neue Nürnberger Spielkarten" (New Nuremberg Playing Cards). It was able to expand the range of playing cards and expand it to include advertising material and other toys, as well as establishing international trade. In 1989, the company was acquired by F.X. Schmid. In 1995, NSV became independent again and in the following year F.X. Schmid was taken over by Ravensburger. The publishing house was managed by Gerhard Lang until 2005, after which his successor and current managing director, Franz Jurthe, took over.

== Range ==
NSV produces card games, dice games, memo games, puzzles and advertising games. Its manufacturing facility is in Zirndorf near Nuremberg. According to the publisher, playing cards for popular classics such as Skat, Tarock, Schafkopf or Poker as well as large range of game are an important part of the range, as well as games and playing cards as an advertising medium for companies, and in recent years increasingly proprietary games designed by various game authors. They are the only producers of special packs for the game of Zwicker which include 6 Jokers in a standard, 52-card, Berlin pattern pack. One of the publisher's most important German sales partners is Heidelberger Spieleverlag. Well-known author games from NSV are the dice game Qwixx, nominated for Game of the Year in 2013, and the card game, The Game, both by Steffen Benndorf. In 2018 the game, The Mind, by Wolfgang Warsch was nominated for Game of the Year.

== Games ==
In addition to classic card packs for the games like Skat, Tarock, Schafkopf, Binokel or Poker NSV produces various other games including:

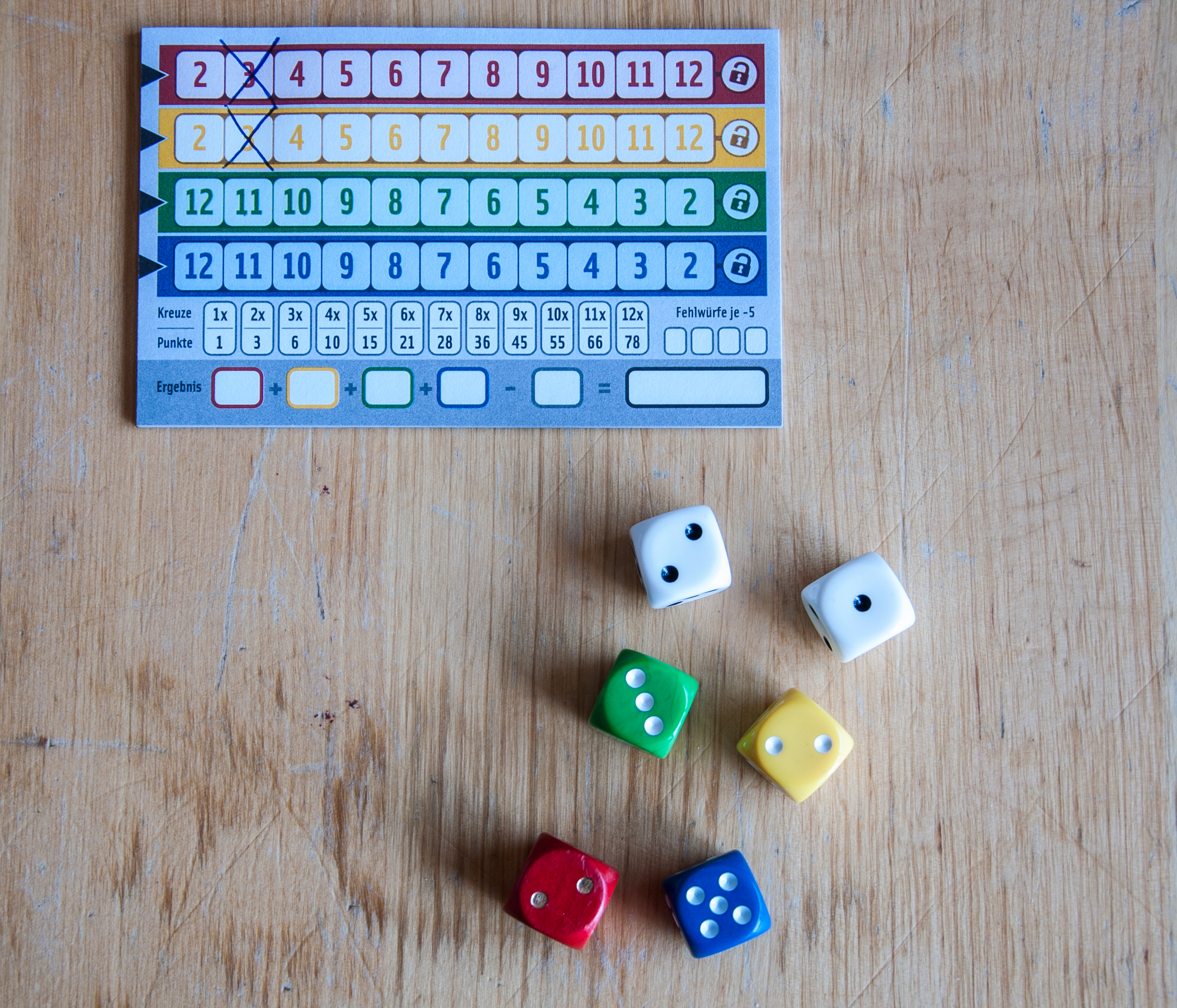
Qwixx

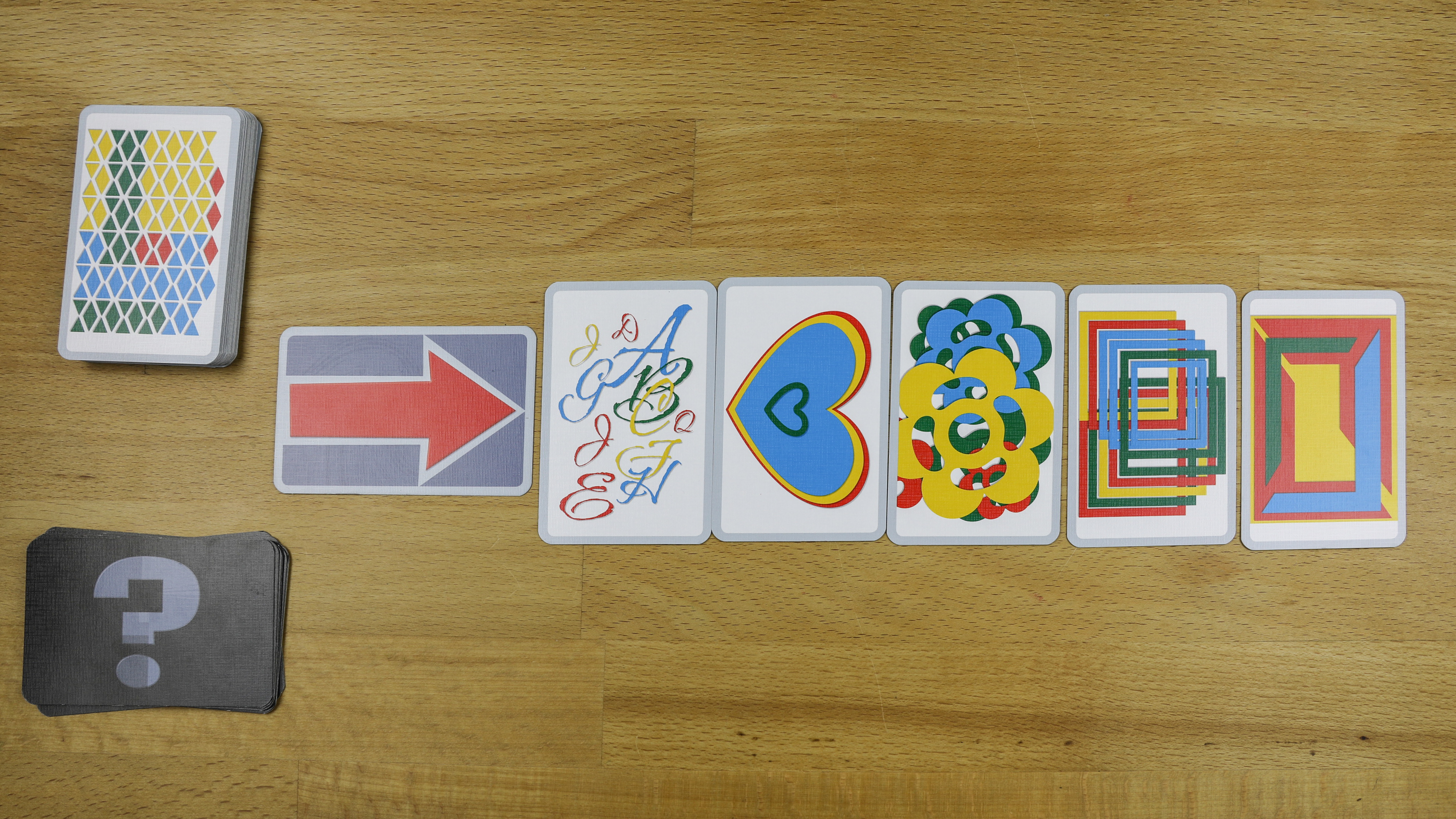
The game of Illusion

- Ärger dich schwarz (2007, Frank Stark)
- Ochsen soxen (2007, Marco Teubner)
- Zoff am Herd (2007, Thomas Camenzind and Robert Stoop)
- Sticheln (2012, Klaus Palesch)
- Land unter (2012, "Modern Classic" Stefan Dorra)
- Qwixx (2013, Steffen Benndorf)
- Basari (2014, Reinhard Staupe)
- Dicht dran (2014, Reinhard Staupe)
- Kuh Vadis (2014, Reinhard Staupe)
- Kuhlorado (2014, Reinhard Staupe)
- Zum Kuhkuck (2014, Reinhard Staupe)
- Qwixx – the Card Game (2014, Steffen Benndorf)
- The Game (2015, Steffen Benndorf)
- Träxx (2016, Steffen Benndorf)
- Life is Life (2016, Lorenz Kutschke)
- Take that (2016, Andreas Spies, Reinhard Staupe)
- Qwinto (2016, Uwe Rapp, Bernhard Lach)
- Qwixx: Das Duell (2016, Steffen Benndorf)
- Qwinto: Das Kartenspiel (2017, Uwe Rapp, Bernhard Lach, Reinhard Staupe)
- twenty one (2017, Steffen Benndorf, Reinhard Staupe)
- Tembo (2017, Andreas Spies)
- Wat’n dat!? (2017, Claude Weber)
- Knister (2017, Heinz Wüppen)
- The Game: Face to Face (2017, Steffen Benndorf)
- Illusion (2018, Wolfgang Warsch)
- Alle gegen Rudi (2018, Reinhard Staupe)
- Qwantum (2018, Stefan Kloß, Anna Oppolzer, Reinhard Staupe)
- Li-La-Laut (2018, Reinhard Staupe)
- Würfelland (2018, Andreas Spies, Reinhard Staupe)
- The Mind (2018, Wolfgang Warsch)
- Go5 (2019, Armin Mumper)
- The Mind - The Sound Experiment (2019, Wolfgang Warsch, Andreas Bindig)
- Knaster (2019, Markus Schleininger, Reinhard Staupe, Heinz Wüppen)
- Ohanami (2019, Steffen Benndorf)
- Silver & Gold (2019, Phil Walker-Harding)
- Kippelino (2019, Reinhard Staupe)
- Qwixx on Board (2019, Steffen Benndorf, Reinhard Staupe)
- Anubixx (2019, Florian Ortlepp, Helmut Ortlepp, Steffen Benndorf)
- The Mind Extreme (2019, Wolfgang Warsch)
- Contact – Signale aus dem Weltall (2020, Steffen Benndorf)
- The Game: Quick & Easy (2020, Steffen Benndorf)
- Wir sind die Roboter (2020, Reinhard Staupe)
