= Osterby, Schleswig-Flensburg =

Osterby Østerby
- Municipality
- Coat of arms

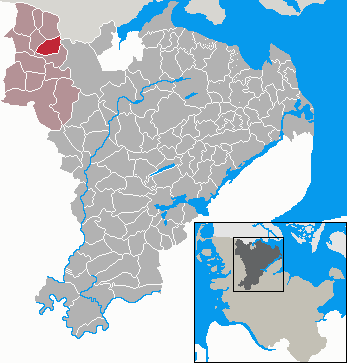
- Location of Osterby; Østerby within Schleswig-Flensburg district
- Interactive map of Osterby; Østerby
- Location within Germany Location within Schleswig-Holstein
- Coordinates: 54°47′N 9°13′E
- Country: Germany
- State: Schleswig-Holstein
- District: Schleswig-Flensburg
- Municipal assoc.: Schafflund

Government
  - Mayor: Arnold Nommensen

Area
  - Total: 12.35 km^{2} (4.77 sq mi)
- Elevation: 26 m (85 ft)

Population (2025-12-31)
  - Total: 313
  - Density: 25.3/km^{2} (65.6/sq mi)
- Time zone: UTC+01:00 (CET)
  - Summer (DST): UTC+02:00 (CEST)
- Postal codes: 24994
- Dialling codes: 04605
- Vehicle registration: SL
- Website: www.amt- schafflund.de

Osterby (Danish: Østerby) is a municipality in the district of Schleswig-Flensburg, in Schleswig-Holstein, Germany.
