= Nordhackstedt =

- Municipality
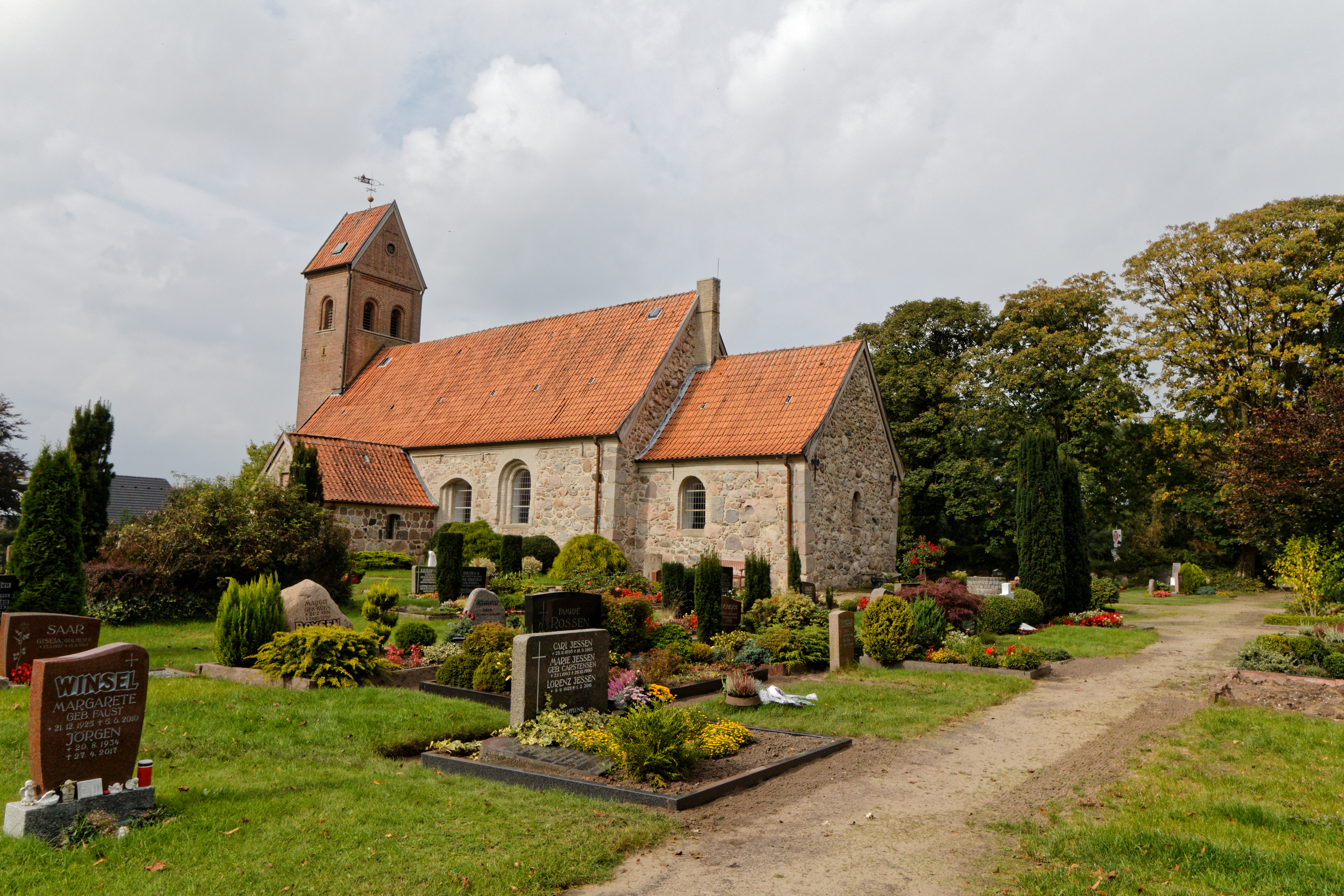
- Nordhackstedt Church

- Coat of arms

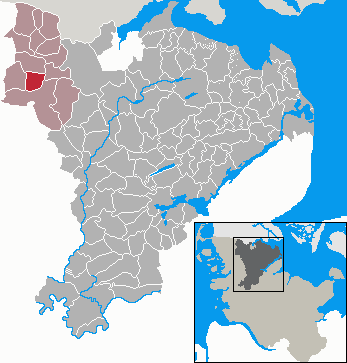
- Location of Nordhackstedt within Schleswig-Flensburg district
- Interactive map of Nordhackstedt
- Location within Germany Location within Schleswig-Holstein
- Coordinates: 54°44′6″N 9°10′4″E
- Country: Germany
- State: Schleswig-Holstein
- District: Schleswig-Flensburg
- Municipal assoc.: Schafflund

Government
  - Mayor: Toni Ingwersen

Area
  - Total: 12.47 km^{2} (4.81 sq mi)
- Elevation: 13 m (43 ft)

Population (2025-12-31)
  - Total: 490
  - Density: 39/km^{2} (100/sq mi)
- Time zone: UTC+01:00 (CET)
  - Summer (DST): UTC+02:00 (CEST)
- Postal codes: 24980
- Dialling codes: 04639
- Vehicle registration: SL
- Website: www.amt- schafflund.de

Nordhackstedt (Danish: Nørre Haksted) is a municipality in the district of Schleswig-Flensburg, in Schleswig-Holstein, Germany.
