= Holt, Germany =

Holt
- Municipality
- Coat of arms

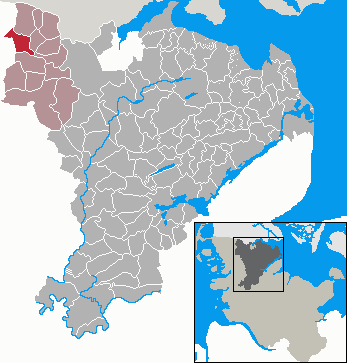
- Location of Holt within Schleswig-Flensburg district
- Interactive map of Holt
- Location within Germany Location within Schleswig-Holstein
- Coordinates: 54°49′N 9°9′E
- Country: Germany
- State: Schleswig-Holstein
- District: Schleswig-Flensburg
- Municipal assoc.: Schafflund

Government
  - Mayor: Karl-Heinz Bendixen

Area
  - Total: 13.42 km^{2} (5.18 sq mi)
- Elevation: 18 m (59 ft)

Population (2025-12-31)
  - Total: 141
  - Density: 10.5/km^{2} (27.2/sq mi)
- Time zone: UTC+01:00 (CET)
  - Summer (DST): UTC+02:00 (CEST)
- Postal codes: 24994
- Dialling codes: 04605
- Vehicle registration: SL
- Website: www.amt- schafflund.de

Holt (German pronunciation: [hɔlt]) is a municipality in the district of Schleswig-Flensburg, in Schleswig-Holstein, Germany.
