= Hörup =

Hörup Hørup
- Municipality
- Coat of arms

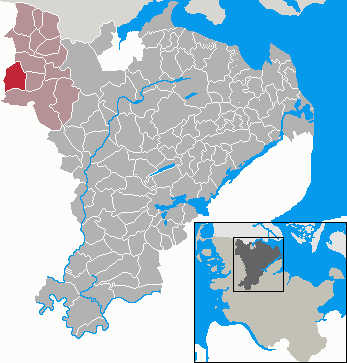
- Location of Hörup; Hørup within Schleswig-Flensburg district
- Interactive map of Hörup; Hørup
- Location within Germany Location within Schleswig-Holstein
- Coordinates: 54°43′N 9°5′E
- Country: Germany
- State: Schleswig-Holstein
- District: Schleswig-Flensburg
- Municipal assoc.: Schafflund

Government
  - Mayor: Joachim Janke

Area
  - Total: 18.15 km^{2} (7.01 sq mi)
- Elevation: 5 m (16 ft)

Population (2025-12-31)
  - Total: 618
  - Density: 34.0/km^{2} (88.2/sq mi)
- Time zone: UTC+01:00 (CET)
  - Summer (DST): UTC+02:00 (CEST)
- Postal codes: 24980
- Dialling codes: 04639
- Vehicle registration: SL
- Website: www.amt- schafflund.de

Hörup (Danish: Hørup) is a municipality in the district of Schleswig-Flensburg, in Schleswig-Holstein, Germany.

The town was first mentioned in 1472 as Horop (place where plenty of hay). Was southeast of the town until the early 20th Mined century bog iron. Hörup was awarded as child, youth and family-friendly community.
