= Böxlund =

Böxlund Bøgslund
- Municipality
- Coat of arms

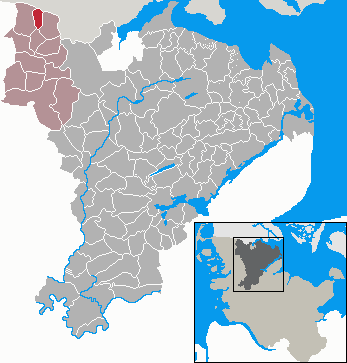
- Location of Böxlund; Bøgslund within Schleswig-Flensburg district
- Interactive map of Böxlund; Bøgslund
- Location within Germany Location within Schleswig-Holstein
- Coordinates: 54°51′N 9°10′E
- Country: Germany
- State: Schleswig-Holstein
- District: Schleswig-Flensburg
- Municipal assoc.: Schafflund

Government
  - Mayor: Bernhard Brodal

Area
  - Total: 4.4 km^{2} (1.7 sq mi)
- Elevation: 23 m (75 ft)

Population (2025-12-31)
  - Total: 121
  - Density: 28/km^{2} (71/sq mi)
- Time zone: UTC+01:00 (CET)
  - Summer (DST): UTC+02:00 (CEST)
- Postal codes: 24994
- Dialling codes: 04605
- Vehicle registration: SL
- Website: www.amt- schafflund.de

Böxlund (Danish: Bøgslund) is a municipality in the district of Schleswig-Flensburg, in Schleswig-Holstein, Germany.
