= Jardelund =

- Municipality
- Coat of arms

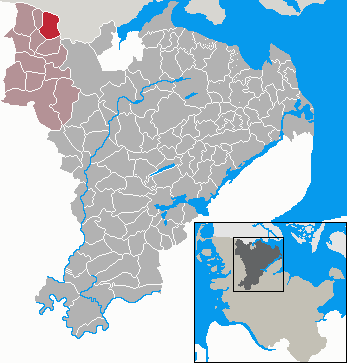
- Location of Jardelund within Schleswig-Flensburg district
- Interactive map of Jardelund
- Location within Germany Location within Schleswig-Holstein
- Coordinates: 54°49′N 9°11′E
- Country: Germany
- State: Schleswig-Holstein
- District: Schleswig-Flensburg
- Municipal assoc.: Schafflund

Government
  - Mayor: Stefan Kunz

Area
  - Total: 16.63 km^{2} (6.42 sq mi)
- Elevation: 32 m (105 ft)

Population (2025-12-31)
  - Total: 296
  - Density: 17.8/km^{2} (46.1/sq mi)
- Time zone: UTC+01:00 (CET)
  - Summer (DST): UTC+02:00 (CEST)
- Postal codes: 24994
- Dialling codes: 04605
- Vehicle registration: SL
- Website: www.amt- schafflund.de

Jardelund is a municipality in the district of Schleswig-Flensburg, in Schleswig-Holstein, Germany.
