= Meyn, Schleswig-Holstein =

Meyn Meden
- Municipality
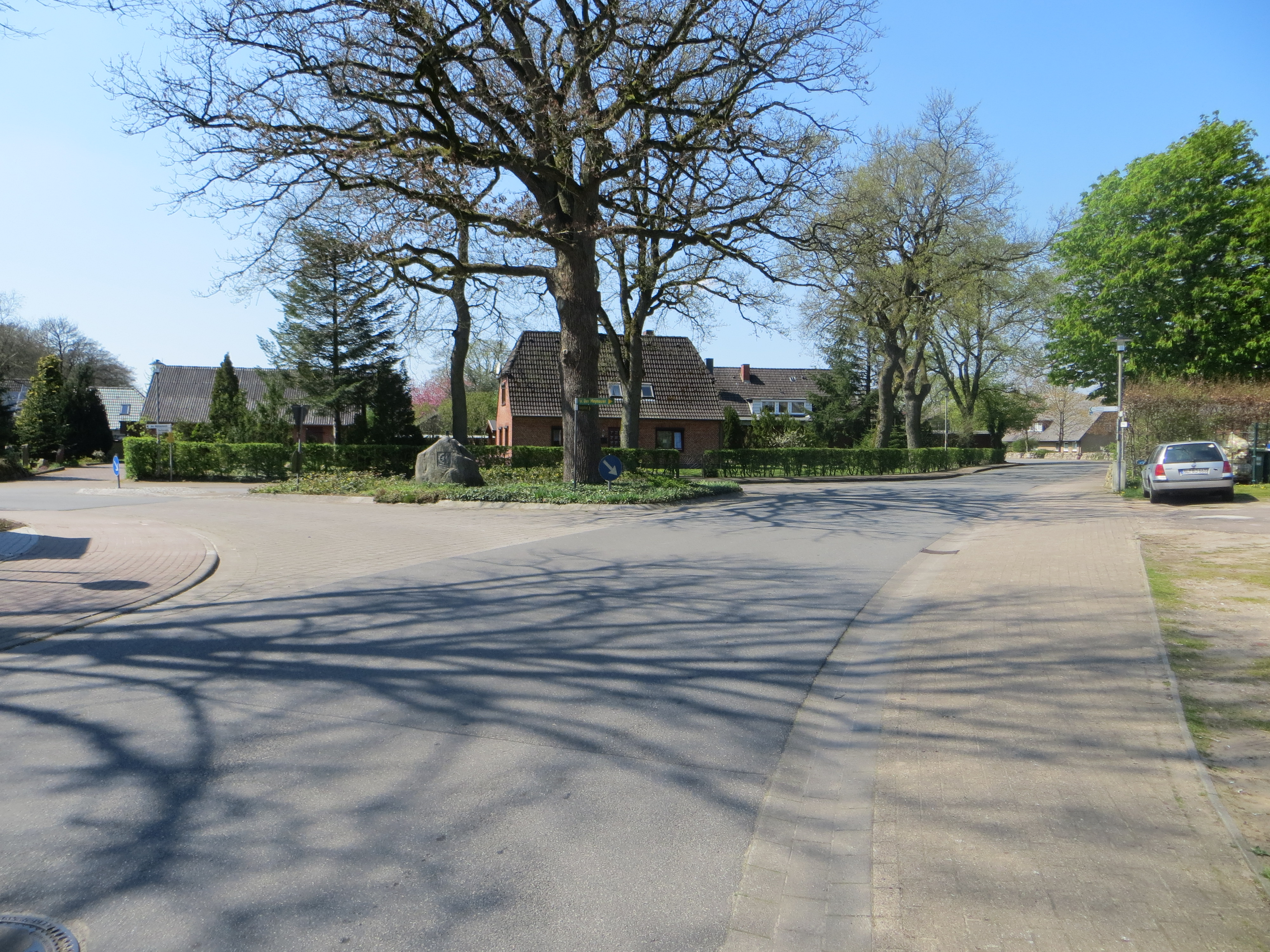

- Coat of arms

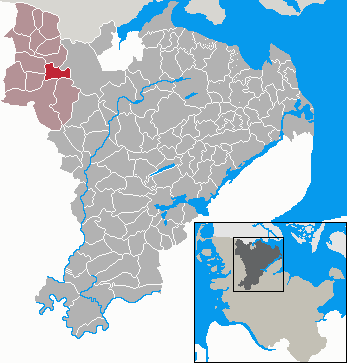
- Location of Meyn; Meden within Schleswig-Flensburg district
- Interactive map of Meyn; Meden
- Location within Germany Location within Schleswig-Holstein
- Coordinates: 54°46′N 9°13′E
- Country: Germany
- State: Schleswig-Holstein
- District: Schleswig-Flensburg
- Municipal assoc.: Schafflund

Government
  - Mayor: Bernd Henkel

Area
  - Total: 12.4 km^{2} (4.8 sq mi)
- Elevation: 19 m (62 ft)

Population (2025-12-31)
  - Total: 738
  - Density: 59.5/km^{2} (154/sq mi)
- Time zone: UTC+01:00 (CET)
  - Summer (DST): UTC+02:00 (CEST)
- Postal codes: 24980
- Dialling codes: 04639
- Vehicle registration: SL
- Website: www.amt- schafflund.de

Meyn (Danish: Meden) is a municipality in the district of Schleswig-Flensburg, in Schleswig-Holstein, Germany.
