= Weesby =

Weesby Vesby
- Municipality
- Coat of arms

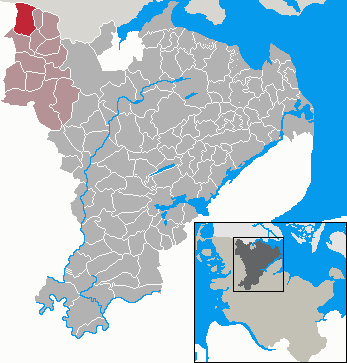
- Location of Weesby; Vesby within Schleswig-Flensburg district
- Interactive map of Weesby; Vesby
- Location within Germany Location within Schleswig-Holstein
- Coordinates: 54°49′N 9°9′E
- Country: Germany
- State: Schleswig-Holstein
- District: Schleswig-Flensburg
- Municipal assoc.: Schafflund

Government
  - Mayor: Geert Voß

Area
  - Total: 21.45 km^{2} (8.28 sq mi)
- Elevation: 28 m (92 ft)

Population (2025-12-31)
  - Total: 431
  - Density: 20.1/km^{2} (52.0/sq mi)
- Time zone: UTC+01:00 (CET)
  - Summer (DST): UTC+02:00 (CEST)
- Postal codes: 24994
- Dialling codes: 04605
- Vehicle registration: SL
- Website: www.amt- schafflund.de

Weesby (Danish: Vesby) is a municipality in the district of Schleswig-Flensburg, in Schleswig-Holstein, Germany. In 2012 it had a population of 456.
