= Lindewitt =

Lindewitt Lindved
- Municipality
- Coat of arms

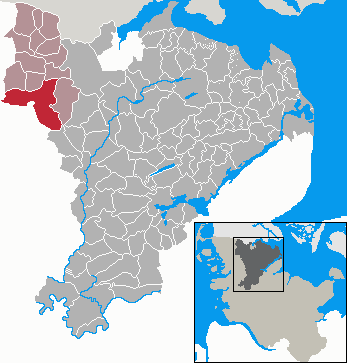
- Location of Lindewitt; Lindved within Schleswig-Flensburg district
- Interactive map of Lindewitt; Lindved
- Location within Germany Location within Schleswig-Holstein
- Coordinates: 54°41′50″N 9°11′47″E
- Country: Germany
- State: Schleswig-Holstein
- District: Schleswig-Flensburg
- Municipal assoc.: Schafflund

Government
  - Mayor: Reinhard Friedrichsen

Area
  - Total: 53.27 km^{2} (20.57 sq mi)
- Elevation: 12 m (39 ft)

Population (2025-12-31)
  - Total: 2,013
  - Density: 37.79/km^{2} (97.87/sq mi)
- Time zone: UTC+01:00 (CET)
  - Summer (DST): UTC+02:00 (CEST)
- Postal codes: 24969
- Dialling codes: 04604 u. 04673
- Vehicle registration: SL
- Website: www.amt- schafflund.de

Lindewitt (Danish: Lindved) is a municipality in the district of Schleswig-Flensburg, in Schleswig-Holstein, Germany.

== Geography ==
Lindewitt lies in a wooded landscape between the North Sea and the Baltic in the northern part of the German state of Schleswig-Holstein. The nearest large town is Flensburg.

The municipality includes the villages of Kleinwiehe (Lille Vi), Linnau (Lindaa), Lüngerau (Lyngvrå), Riesbriek (Risbrig), and Sillerup.
