= Schafflund =

Schafflund Skovlund
- Municipality
- Coat of arms

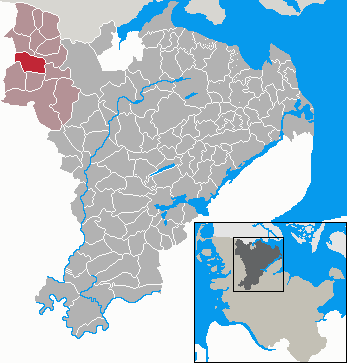
- Location of Schafflund; Skovlund within Schleswig-Flensburg district
- Interactive map of Schafflund; Skovlund
- Location within Germany Location within Schleswig-Holstein
- Coordinates: 54°46′N 9°10′E
- Country: Germany
- State: Schleswig-Holstein
- District: Schleswig-Flensburg
- Municipal assoc.: Schafflund

Government
  - Mayor: Jürgen Schrum (CDU)

Area
  - Total: 19.09 km^{2} (7.37 sq mi)
- Elevation: 16 m (52 ft)

Population (2025-12-31)
  - Total: 3,031
  - Density: 158.8/km^{2} (411.2/sq mi)
- Time zone: UTC+01:00 (CET)
  - Summer (DST): UTC+02:00 (CEST)
- Postal codes: 24980
- Dialling codes: 04639
- Vehicle registration: SL
- Website: www.amt-schafflund.de

Schafflund (Danish: Skovlund, North Frisian: Schaflün) is a municipality in the district of Schleswig-Flensburg, in Schleswig-Holstein, Germany. It is situated approximately 16 km west of Flensburg.

Schafflund is the seat of the Amt ("collective municipality") Schafflund.
