= Skwitz =

Austrian card game

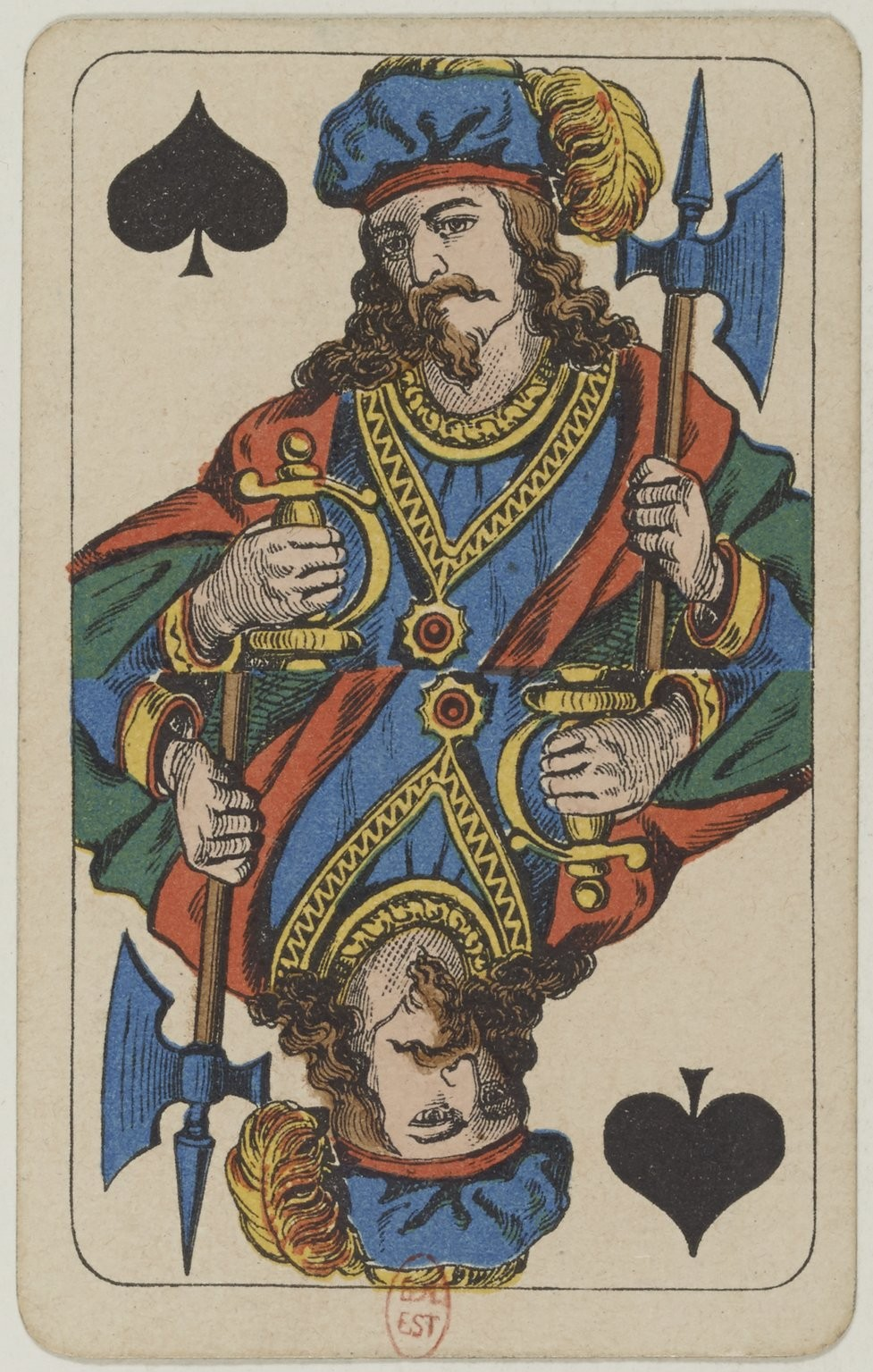
- One of the matadors: the Jack of Spades
- Origin: Austria or England
- Type: Fishing
- Family: Matching
- Players: 2–8
- Skills: Tactics
- Cards: 52
- Deck: French
- Play: Anticlockwise
- Playing time: 10-15 min.
- Chance: Medium

Related games
- Cassino • Escoba • Scopa • Zwickern

Skwitz was a 19th-century Austrian card game of the fishing type for 2 to 8 players that was said to be of English origin. It may be a descendant of Cassino which it resembles.

== History ==
The game appears as early as an 1852 Viennese 'house calendar' where it is described as a "social game" that is relaxing and entertaining to play. It is also published in a number of Viennese games compendia around that time, including the 1866 edition of the Neuestes Universal Spielbuch which carries an identical account of the rules. Despite its supposed English origin, possibly in a game called Quits, there appears to be no record of it being played there.

== Equipment ==
The game is played with a French-suited Whist pack of 52 cards and no Jokers. Aces are low. There are 3 matadors which earn bonuses: the ♠J, ♠10 and ♠2.

The game was played for points and money. Each player needed a dish for their own chips or coins ('pool') and a larger dish for the pot was recommended. A basic stake of 1-5 chips or ¼ kreuzer was suggested.

== Players ==
The game is described for two to eight players, however, the number of cards dealt to the players and the table at the start and the number of cards drawn by each player during each deal varies depending on the number playing. Four players could play in two teams of two, each sharing a common pool.

== Rules ==
The following rules are summarised from the Vanderheid / house calendar account and assume four players and a stake of 4 chips.

=== Dealing ===
Deal and play are anticlockwise. Each player antes 4 chips to the pot. The dealer shuffles until the cutter is satisfied, indicating this by cutting the pack or saying "it's good" (gut ist's). The dealer looks at the bottom card; if it is a matador, the cards are reshuffled.

The dealer then places 4 cards, in line and face up, on the table before handing the remaining stock to forehand, the player on his right. Each player in turn now draws the top four cards from the stock into his hand.

=== Playing ===
Once all the players have drawn their cards, the players, in turn and beginning with forehand, try to capture the table cards by matching or summing in accordance with the following rules:

- Matching. Any court or number card held by the player may capture one or more cards of the same rank, regardless of suit e.g. a Queen may capture one or more Queens from the table and a Five may capture one or more Fives.
- Summing. Any number card (2, 3... 10) may capture two or more number cards that add up to the number of the capturing card. Court cards have no numerical value so may not do this. Aces are only worth one so, again, cannot capture by summing.
- Multiple captures A card may make multiple captures e.g. an Ace may capture two Aces; a Ten may capture a Ten, a Seven and a Three.
- Skwitz A player who sweeps the table clear in capturing cards calls "Skwitz!" for a bonus.
- Trailing. A player unable to capture any cards must trail by playing a card alongside the existing table cards.

Captured cards are placed face down in a pile next to the player who captured them. Each skwitz is recorded by turning one of the captured cards face up.

Once all the cards have been played, the dealer clears any remaining cards from the table and announces "these are the last" (dies sind die Letzten).

=== Payments during the game ===
Payments are made during the game as follows:

- Capturing a matador: every other player pays 2 chips (Note: The rules say half the ante which in this case is 2 chips) to the captor (Note: The rules says "to the winner" but this surely means the one who captured the matador/made the skwitz and not the eventual winner of the game.) and 2 to the pot
- Making a skwitz: every other player pays 2 chips to the skwitzer and 2 to the pot

The rules also list numerous instances of breaches for which the penalty is invariably the payment of half the stake (2 chips) to each of the other players.

=== Scoring and winning ===
One point is scored for each of the following:

- Most cards
- Most Spades
- Each skwitz
- Each matador captured
- Last trick (i.e. the last player to capture a table card)

A player who reaches the agreed number of points (usually 7) may declare "Out!" (Aus!) when the turn to play comes round, whereupon everyone else pays 4 to the pot and 4 to the winner. (Note: The rules say an amount equal to the ante which in this case is 4 chips) In addition, any player with no points is 'in the mud' (matsch) and pays 4 to the pot and 4 to the winner. However, a player on 7 points may opt to play on to try to earn more through capturing matadors and making skwitzes.

Once the payments for the "out" and matsch have been made, the current dealer passes the pot to the winner who places it beside him without emptying it and becomes the next dealer (this overrides the normal sequence in which the dealer rotates to the right if no-one has scored 7 points). A player who wins twice in this way, collects the contents of the pot after the payments for "out" and matsch have been made.

== Literature ==
- _ (1852). Neuer allgemeiner illustrirte österreichischer Schreib- und Hauskalendar, Year 2. Albert A. Wenedikt, Vienna, pp. 39–46.
- Vanderheid, Christian (1866). Neuestes Universal Spielbuch. Albert A. Wenedikt, Vienna, pp. 13–26.
