= Großenwiehe =

Großenwiehe Store Vi
- Municipality
- Coat of arms

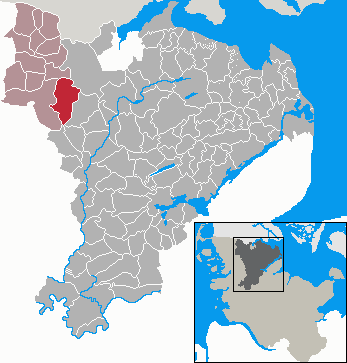
- Location of Großenwiehe; Store Vi within Schleswig-Flensburg district
- Interactive map of Großenwiehe; Store Vi
- Location within Germany Location within Schleswig-Holstein
- Coordinates: 54°42′N 9°15′E
- Country: Germany
- State: Schleswig-Holstein
- District: Schleswig-Flensburg
- Municipal assoc.: Schafflund

Government
  - Mayor: Michael Schulz (CDU)

Area
  - Total: 30.2 km^{2} (11.7 sq mi)
- Elevation: 20 m (66 ft)

Population (2025-12-31)
  - Total: 3,316
  - Density: 110/km^{2} (284/sq mi)
- Time zone: UTC+01:00 (CET)
  - Summer (DST): UTC+02:00 (CEST)
- Postal codes: 24969
- Dialling codes: 04604
- Vehicle registration: SL
- Website: www.amt- schafflund.de

Großenwiehe (Danish: Store Vi) is a municipality in the district of Schleswig-Flensburg, in Schleswig-Holstein, Germany.
