= Scopa =

Italian card game

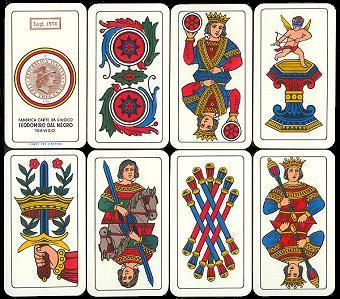
- Italian playing cards from a deck of "Bergamasche" by Dal Negro
- Origin: Italy
- Type: Fishing
- Players: 2, 3, 4, or 6
- Cards: 40-card
- Deck: Italian
- Rank (high→low): R C F 7 6 5 4 3 2 1
- Play: Counter-clockwise

Related games
- Cassino • Escoba • Skwitz • Zwickern

Scopa (Italian: [ˈskoːpa]; lit. 'broom') is an Italian fishing card game, and one of the three major national card games in Italy, the others being Briscola and Tresette. It is also popular in Argentina and Brazil, brought in by Italian immigrants, mostly in the Scopa a Quindici variation. Scopa is also played in former Italian colonies such as Libya and Somalia or some other countries like Tunisia and even Morocco, with changed appearance in the cards. It is played with a standard Italian 40-card deck, mostly between two players or four in two partnerships, but it can also be played by three or six players.

The name scopa is an Italian noun meaning 'broom', since taking a scopa means 'to sweep' all the cards from the table. Watching a game of scopa can be a highly entertaining activity, since games traditionally involve lively, colorful, and somewhat strong-worded banter in between hands. However, skill and chance are more important for the outcome of the game.

== History ==
Scopa was particularly popular in the city of Naples during the 18th century, although it was already widespread throughout the rest of Italy.

It is believed to have originated from two Spanish games called Primero and Scarabucion, widely played in Naples' port area as early as the 15th century. There, pirates and fishermen would stop to gamble away the spoils they had seized during raids on merchant ships.

== Cards ==
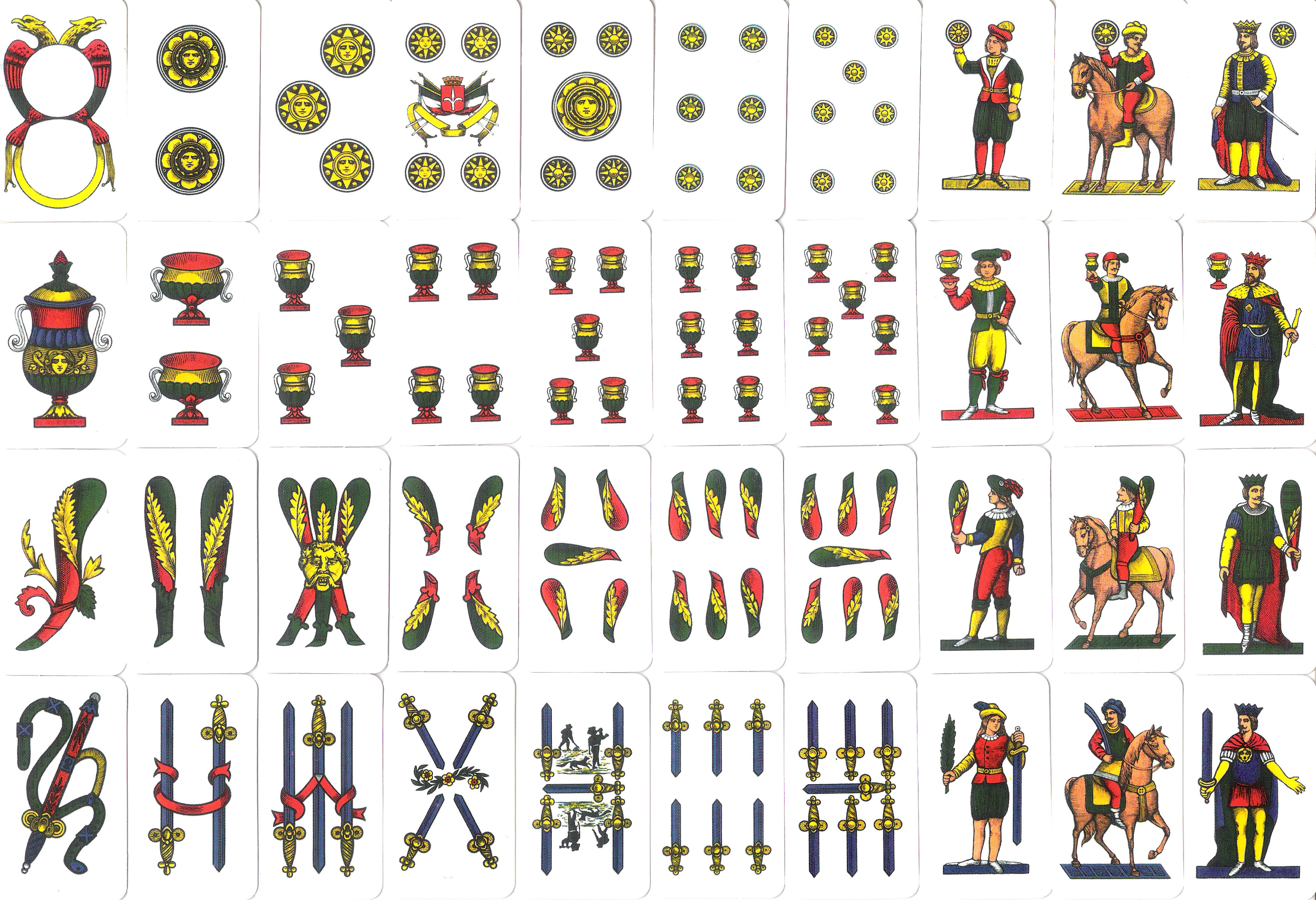
A set of 40 "Napoletane" cards. The rows depict the suits Denari, Coppe, Bastoni, and Spade.

A deck of Italian cards consist of 40 cards, divided into four suits. Neapolitan, Piacentine, Triestine, and Sicilian cards are divided into Coppe (Cups), Ori or Denari (Golds or Coins), Spada (Swords) and Bastoni (Clubs) or Mazzi (Clubs in Sicilian), while Piemontesi, Milanesi and Toscane cards use the 'French' suits, that is Cuori (Hearts), Quadri (Diamonds, lit. 'Squares'), Fiori (Flowers) and Picche (Spades, lit. 'Pikes').

The values on the cards range numerically from one through seven, plus three face cards in each suit: Knave [Fante in Italian] (worth a value of 8), Knight [Cavallo in Italian] in the Neapolitan-type decks, Queen [Donna in Italian] in the Milanese-type decks (worth 9), and King [Re in Italian] (worth 10). A Knave is a lone male figure standing. The Knight is a male figure riding a horse; the Queen is a female figure. The King is a male figure wearing a crown. To determine the face value of any numeric card, simply count the number of suit icons on the card. Since the Coins/Diamonds are important in winning some points, the cards of that suit are also nicknamed as "bello" (handsome): so, "il settebello" is the Seven of Coins/Diamonds, "l'asso bello" is the ace of Coins/Diamonds.

== Rules ==
All players arrange themselves around the playing surface. If playing in teams, team members should be opposite each other. One player is chosen to be the dealer.

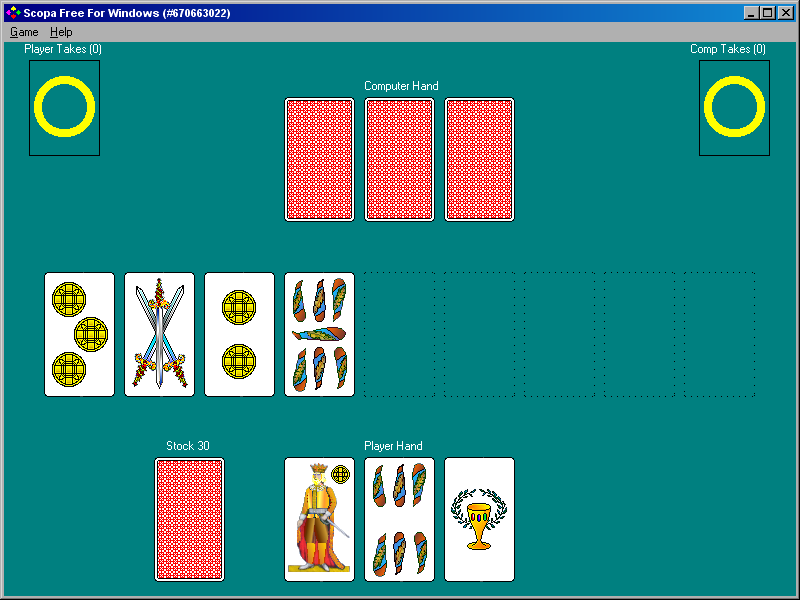
Initial setting of the game

Each player receives three cards. The dealer deals them out one card at a time, in a counter-clockwise direction, beginning with the player to their right. During this deal, the dealer will also place four cards face up on the table. A table card may be dealt before the deal begins, immediately after dealing a card to themselves but before dealing to the next player, or after dealing all players all three cards.

As it is impossible to sweep in a game where the initial table cards include three or four kings, such a deal is considered invalid. The cards are re-shuffled, and the dealer deals again.

The player to the dealer's right begins play. This player has two options: either place a card on the table or play a card to capture one or more cards. A capture is made by matching a card in the player's hand to a card of the same value on the table, or if that is not possible, by matching a card in the player's hand to the sum of the values of two or more cards on the table. In both cases, both the card from the player's hand and the captured card(s) are removed and placed face down in a pile in front of the player. These cards are now out of play until scores are calculated at the end of the round. If by capturing, all cards were removed from the table, then this is called a scopa, and an additional point is awarded at the end of the round (unless this happened with the final card played by the last player of the last hand of a round, in which case cards are still captured but no additional point is awarded).

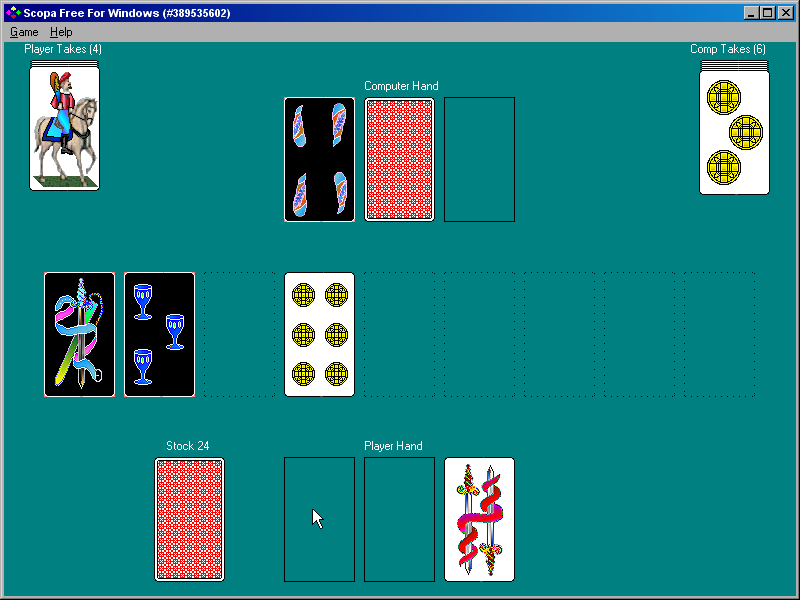
Opponent is capturing two cards with one card from his hand (1+3=4).

Example: the player's hand contains the 2 of coins, 5 of swords, and 7 of clubs (or batons). On the table are the ace of coins, 5 of cups, and 6 of swords. The player's options are:

1. Place the 2 of coins on the table;
2. Capture the 5 of cups using the 5 of swords, and place both cards face down in front of themselves;
3. Capture the 6 of swords and ace of coins using the 7 of clubs, and place all three cards face down in front of themselves.

Note that it is not legal to place on the table a card that has the ability to capture. For example, if a 2 and a 4 are on the table and a player holds a 6, the player must either take that trick or play a different card from their hand.

In any circumstance in which a played card may capture either a single or multiple cards, the player is forced to capture only the single card. For example, if the cards on the table are 1, 3, 4, and 8 (Knave, or Fante in Italian), and the player plays another Knave, the player is not allowed to capture the 1, 3, and 4, even though their total does add up to 8. Instead, the player is only allowed to capture the Knave.

After all players have played all three cards, the dealer deals out three more cards to each player, again beginning with the player to their right. That player then begins play again. No additional cards are dealt to the table. This process is repeated until no cards remain in the deck.

After the dealer has played the final card of the final hand of the round, the player who most recently captured is awarded any remaining cards on the table, and points are calculated for each player or team. If no team has yet won the game, the deal moves to the right. The new dealer shuffles and deals the cards as described above.

== Scoring ==
Points are awarded at the completion of each deal. If playing in teams, the team members combine their captured cards before counting to calculate points. Players get one point for each "scopa".

In addition, there are up to four points available for the following, each worth 1 point apiece:

- captured the greatest number of cards.
- captured the greatest number of cards in the suit of coins.
- captured the seven of coins ("sette bello", "settore" or in English, "beautiful seven" or "lucky seven").
- obtained the highest "prime" (lit. 'primiera'), erroneously referred to as simply "capturing the majority of sevens".

If two or more teams or players capture the same number of cards, the same number of coin cards, or the same prime value, no point is awarded for that result, e.g. if both team 1 and team 2 capture 20 cards total, neither gets a point for the most cards.

The "prime" for each team is determined by selecting the team's "best" card in each of the four suits, and totaling those four cards' point values. When calculating the prime, a separate point scale is used. The player with the highest number of points using this separate point scale gets one point toward the game score.

The most common version of the separate scale is:

Card rank	Point value
Seven (sette)	21
Six (sei)	18
Ace (asso)	16
Five (cinque)	15
Four (quattro)	14
Three (tre)	13
Two (due)	12
Face cards	10

If one team captures the seven of cups and coins, the six of clubs and the ace of swords, that team's prime is (21 + 21 + 18 + 16) = 76.

Other versions of the prime's point scale exist. Most use the same ranking of cards but have variant scores, e.g. 0 points for face cards instead of 10. A variant that is popular in America but disliked by purists is to award the prime to the person with the most sevens, or the person with the most sixes if there is a tie, down to aces, and so on.

Obviously, the seven of coins is the most valuable card in the deck, as it alone contributes to all the four points. A player or team can win the "prime" even with only one seven but other useful cards. If one player has three sevens (3x21) and no cards of the fourth suit (sum=63), their opponent can win the "prime" with one seven (21) and three aces (3x16), for their sum would be 69. Therefore, it is a common tactic, while playing the game, to capture aces and sixes whenever possible.

Likewise, if a player is holding a six and there are an ace, a two, a four, and a five on the table, they should choose the five plus the ace, unless they have already taken the seven or the six of the suit of the ace and unless one of the two remaining cards is of the coins suit and they have not made the point of coins yet.

In addition to the four standard points (called "punti di mazzo", lit. 'deck's points'), teams are awarded additional points for every "scopa" they took during game play. A scopa is awarded when a team manages to sweep the table of all cards. That is, if the table contains only a 2 and a 4, and player A plays a 6, player A is awarded a scopa. Clearing the table on the last play of the last hand of a round does not count as a scopa.

The game is played until one team has at least 11 points and has a greater total than any other team. No points, including scopa points, are awarded mid-round; they are all calculated upon completion of the round. For that reason, if the current score is 10 to 9, and the team with 10 points captures the seven of coins or a scopa, the team cannot immediately claim victory. It is still possible that the opposing team could end up with a tied or higher score once all points are calculated.

In some Italian cities, before the game the players can agree to play with the cappotto variant. In that scenario, if a player is winning 7 points to 0 then the game can be considered over and the player does not have to reach the total of 11 points.

It is also possible to agree on a different score, usually with increments of five or ten, e.g., 16, 21 or 31 points.

== Idioms ==
Traditionally, one card from a sweep is turned face up in the captured cards, to remind players while calculating points that a scopa was won, and to taunt them. Many players deal the initial table cards in a 2x2 square.

== Variants ==
There are many variants and minor variations of scopa. Since there are no formal rules, it is good manners to agree with the other players on the rules that are to be used before starting a game.

Many of the variations here can be combined. For example, a common variant in the Milan area combines "Scopone scientifico", "Scopa d'Assi" and "Napola".

=== Playing with French-suited cards ===
When playing with a standard 52-card pack with French suits, 12 cards need to be removed from the deck. Easiest for most new players is to remove the face cards, and therefore play with cards ranging numerically from one through ten. More traditional is to remove the eights, nines, and tens from the deck, which yields the 40-card "Milanese" deck. With the Milanese deck the Jack is 8, the Queen is 9, and the King is 10 (note that in some Neapolitan decks, the Jack is called "Lady" and is worth 8). Regardless of which cards are removed, the diamonds suit is used for the Italian coin suit, making capturing the most diamonds and the seven of diamonds each worth a point.

Alternatively, it is possible to play an 8 player game of scopa using all 52 cards. 4 cards are placed face-up on the table, and 3 cards are dealt to each player for 2 rounds (52 = 4 + 3 * 8 * 2). Jacks are treated as value 11, Queens as 12, and Kings as 13. It is recommended to play multiple games so that each player has the opportunity to deal and to mitigate first-player advantage. Points can be rewarded for ties, and the player with the most points after all the games is the winner.

=== Scopa d'Assi (Asso piglia tutto) ===
In this variation of the game, playing an Ace captures all cards currently on the table (and does not count as a scopa).

Depending on the variant chosen, it can happen that an ace is already on the table when one draws an ace. Rules vary as to whether or not the player will take all the cards, but usually, the player takes only the ace already on the table. This event, that every player will try to avoid, is called "burning an ace".

=== Scopone ===
The game of Scopone (sometimes referred to as Scopone scientifico) is based on Scopa. In this game, which must be played in two teams of two, players are dealt all nine of their cards at the start of each round. Play proceeds around the table until all players have played all of their cards.

In another form of the game, Scopone a 10 carte, the players are dealt ten cards each so that none are left.

Scopa d'Assi is mostly played in the latter variant.

=== Napola ===
In this variation (also known as Scopone trentino), a team capturing the ace, two, and three of coins achieves the Napola (aka Napula) and is awarded additional points equal to the highest consecutive coin they obtain, e.g. if a team captures the ace, two, three, four, and five, and eight of coins, that team is awarded 6 additional points. 3 points for the Napola, 1 point for each other carta di denari (card in the suit of coins). Settebello ( 7) is then worth 2 points (one for the card and one for being in the sequence) as is Re Bello ( K), if the variation below is played.

Because of the higher number of points awarded per game, the game is played until one team has 21 points, rather than 11. Sometimes a team that manages to capture all 10 coins in a single round wins the game immediately.

=== Additional points ===
In the Re Bello (lit. 'Beautiful King') version, the King of coins also counts as a point, just as does the seven of coins.

In some regions of Calabria (especially near Cosenza), a point is awarded for the seven of cups in addition to the seven of coins.

In Napoli, if a player gets all four sevens in a hand, as well as scoring a point for the primiera they get an additional point Le palle del cane (lit. 'The dog's bollocks').

=== Scopa a Quindici ===
In this variation, the played card does not take a card or set of cards that sum to the value of the card played. Rather, it takes any set of cards including itself that add to 15. If the table is A, 3, 5, 7, playing a 2 would take itself plus the A, 5 and 7 (A + 2 + 5 + 7 = 15).

=== Cirulla ===
The game of Cirulla (in Ligurian cirolla [tʃiˈɾulːa] or ciammachinze [ˌtʃamaˈkiŋze]) is the variant most commonly found in Liguria and bordering areas such as Lower Piedmont, and is usually played with the 40-card Genoese deck by 2, 3 or 4 players. This variant combines elements of traditional Scopa, Scopa a quindici, Scopa d'assi and Napola, and awards additional points for special combinations held in the hand or captured.

Each player is dealt three cards, and four cards are dealt to the table. If two or more aces are dealt to the table, the cards are collected, re-shuffled, and dealt again by the next dealer.

==== Capture ====
Cards in Cirulla can be captured in one of three ways:

- 'Simple capture'. Like in Scopa, a card in one's hand can capture a card on the table of the same rank; or multiple cards whose ranks add up to its value. When a single card can capture different combinations of cards, players may choose whichever combination suits them best. They are not forced to take the least amount of cards possible. Thus, with 'J 5 3' on the table, a player holding a 'J' would be free to either capture the 'J', or the '5' and '3' (and not be forced to take the first option, like in Scopa).
- 'Fifteen-capture'. Similarly to Scopa a quindici, a card in one's hand can capture one or more cards on the table when the total sum of their values adds up to 15. Similarly to above, when multiple captures are available with a single card, players may choose the one they prefer. For example: with 'A 6 7' on the table, a player holding a 'J' could choose to either capture the '7' (since 8 + 7 = 15) or the 'A' and the '6' (8 + 6 + 1 = 15).
- 'Ace-capture'. Playing an ace allows a player to capture all cards on the table, and counts as a scopa (worth one point). This type of capture is always possible, unless an ace is already on the table – in which case playing the ace can only capture the ace already on the table (or be used to perform a 'fifteen-capture', if applicable).

When multiple types of captures are possible, players are always free to choose the one that suits them best, with the exception of the ace-capture which is unavailable when an ace is already on the table.

==== Bonuses ====
There are two hand bonuses available which award points for certain combinations of the three cards held in the hand:

- A 'three-point bonus' (in Ligurian barsega [ˈbaːrsega] or boña da trei [ˈbuŋˑa da ˈtrej]) is awarded to players who hold three cards whose values add up to strictly less than 10 (e.g. '7 A A', 'A 3 4', etc.). Normally, the player scoring this bonus keeps tracks of the extra points by marking three scope.
- A 'ten-point bonus' (in Ligurian boña da dexe [ˈbuŋˑa da ˈdeːʒe]) is awarded to players that hold three cards of the same rank.

Such bonuses must be declared before the player holding them has played their first card (typically this is done by knocking on the table) and the player making the announcement must reveal their hand and leave it turned up. For the rare cases in which a hand qualifies for both bonuses (e.g. when a player holds three threes), only the ten-point bonus is normally awarded, although variations to this rule exist.

Two more bonuses are available to the dealer, as a way of balancing the fact that players in this role are generally at a disadvantage:

- 'One-scopa bonus'. If the four cards dealt by the dealer to the table at the start of a round add up to 15, the dealer captures them and marks a scopa.
- 'Two-scopa bonus'. If the four cards dealt to the table at the start add up to 30, the dealer captures them and scores two scope.

For the purposes of the two hand bonuses and the two dealer bonuses, the 7♥ counts as a wildcard (in Ligurian poncin [puŋˈtʃiŋ], in Italian matta) and can play the role of any other card that the player chooses, but only as long as doing so allows them to score one of these four bonuses. For instance, a player holding Q♦ Q♣ 7♥ may declare that the 7♥ is a queen, thus qualifying them for the ten-point bonus. The 7♥ will then keep its declared rank (in this example a queen, which has a value of nine) for the rest of the hand for the purposes of card capturing (and could therefore capture a '6' since 9 + 6 = 15), but will then revert to being the 7♥. On the other hand, a player holding Q♦ K♣ 7♥ is not allowed to take advantage of the 7♥ as a wildcard since, no matter what value it might be declared to have, this will not allow the player to score a bonus.

==== Scoring ====
Scoring works similarly to standard Scopa, with points being awarded for having captured the most cards, the most diamonds, the 7♦, holding the best 'prime', and an extra point for each scopa (sgobba [ˈsgubˑa]). Additionally:

- Three points are awarded for capturing A23♦, known in Ligurian as a bassa [a ˈbasˑa] and in Italian as la piccola. This bonus can be extended by having captured further cards in the sequence, so that A234♦ is worth four points, all the way up to A23456♦ which is worth six points.
- Five points are awarded for capturing JQK♦, known in Ligurian as l'erta [l ˈɛːrta] and in Italian as la grande.

With such a high degree of point-awarding combinations and the possibility of scoring dozens of points in a single hand, Cirulla games are tense affairs, where seemingly desperate situations can be reversed in a matter of minutes. As a result, the game is typically played until a player (or team, if playing the 4-player partnership variant) reaches 51 points. However, if a player or team manages to capture all diamonds in one round, they win the game immediately.

=== Libyan Scopa ===
Scopa is very popular in Libya and is usually played as mentioned above, but some local variations are often added, such as:

- a sweep of Diamonds (sometimes eight are enough) will reset the opponent to zero,
- players count Scopas based on the value of the winning card (if the 'winning card' is worth 7, the scopa is worth 7),
- players count Scopa values based on the total number of cards involved (if a scopa numbers 5 cards, the number of points awarded for that scopa equals 5; if a scopa is but 2 cards, only 2 points are awarded).

=== Scoring the prime ===
A number of variant point systems are used for calculating the prime, most of which produce the same order of hands. One notable variant that does not produce the same order is to count 0 points for each face card.

=== Final score ===
Some play to 16 or 21 points, or even to an arbitrary score agreed to at the beginning of the game.

== Computer versions ==
There is a playable version of scopa within the Nancy Drew game The Phantom of Venice.

There are apps for Android smartphones and the Nokia internet tablet running the Maemo operating system, as well as for iOS iPads and iPhones.

== See also ==
Card games related to scopa include:

- Briscola
- Cassino
- Chkobba
- Escoba
- Koi-Koi
- Pasur
- Zwicker

Scopa features prominently in The Scientific Cardplayer, a 1972 Italian film.

== Literature ==
- Angiolino, Andrea; Sidoti, Beniamino (2010). Dizionario dei Giochi. Bologna: Zanichelli. ISBN 978-88-08-19349-0.
