= Medelby =

- Municipality
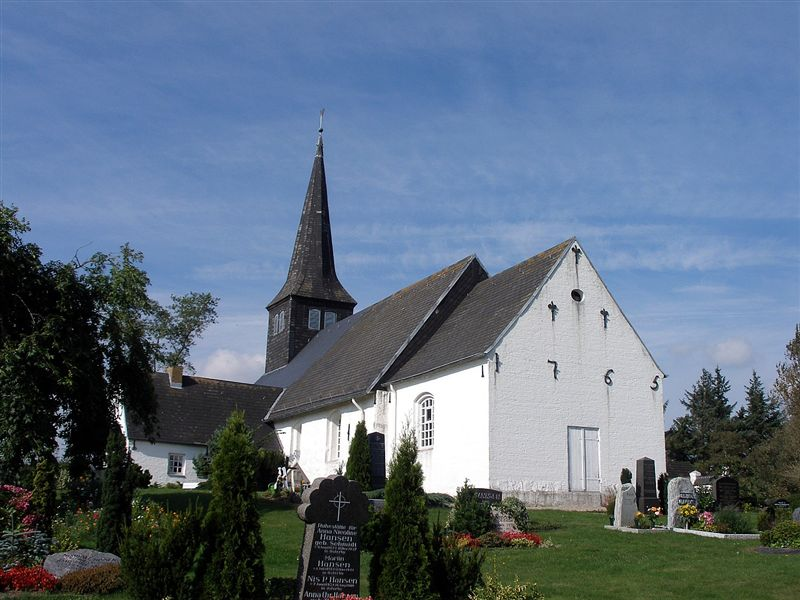
- Medelby Church

- Coat of arms

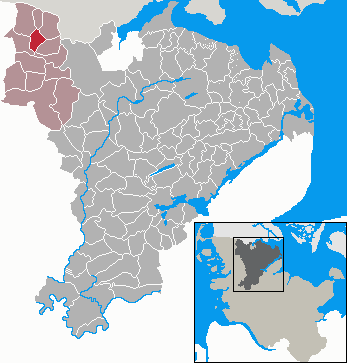
- Location of Medelby within Schleswig-Flensburg district
- Interactive map of Medelby
- Location within Germany Location within Schleswig-Holstein
- Coordinates: 54°48′45″N 9°10′25″E
- Country: Germany
- State: Schleswig-Holstein
- District: Schleswig-Flensburg
- Municipal assoc.: Schafflund

Government
  - Mayor: Günther Petersen (CDU)

Area
  - Total: 9.75 km^{2} (3.76 sq mi)
- Elevation: 24 m (79 ft)

Population (2025-12-31)
  - Total: 1,052
  - Density: 108/km^{2} (279/sq mi)
- Time zone: UTC+01:00 (CET)
  - Summer (DST): UTC+02:00 (CEST)
- Postal codes: 24994
- Dialling codes: 04605
- Vehicle registration: SL
- Website: www.amt- schafflund.de

Medelby is a municipality in the district of Schleswig-Flensburg, in Schleswig-Holstein, Germany.
