= Thorsberg moor =

Bog and iron age deposit site in north Germany

Coordinates: 54°38′24″N 9°46′12″E

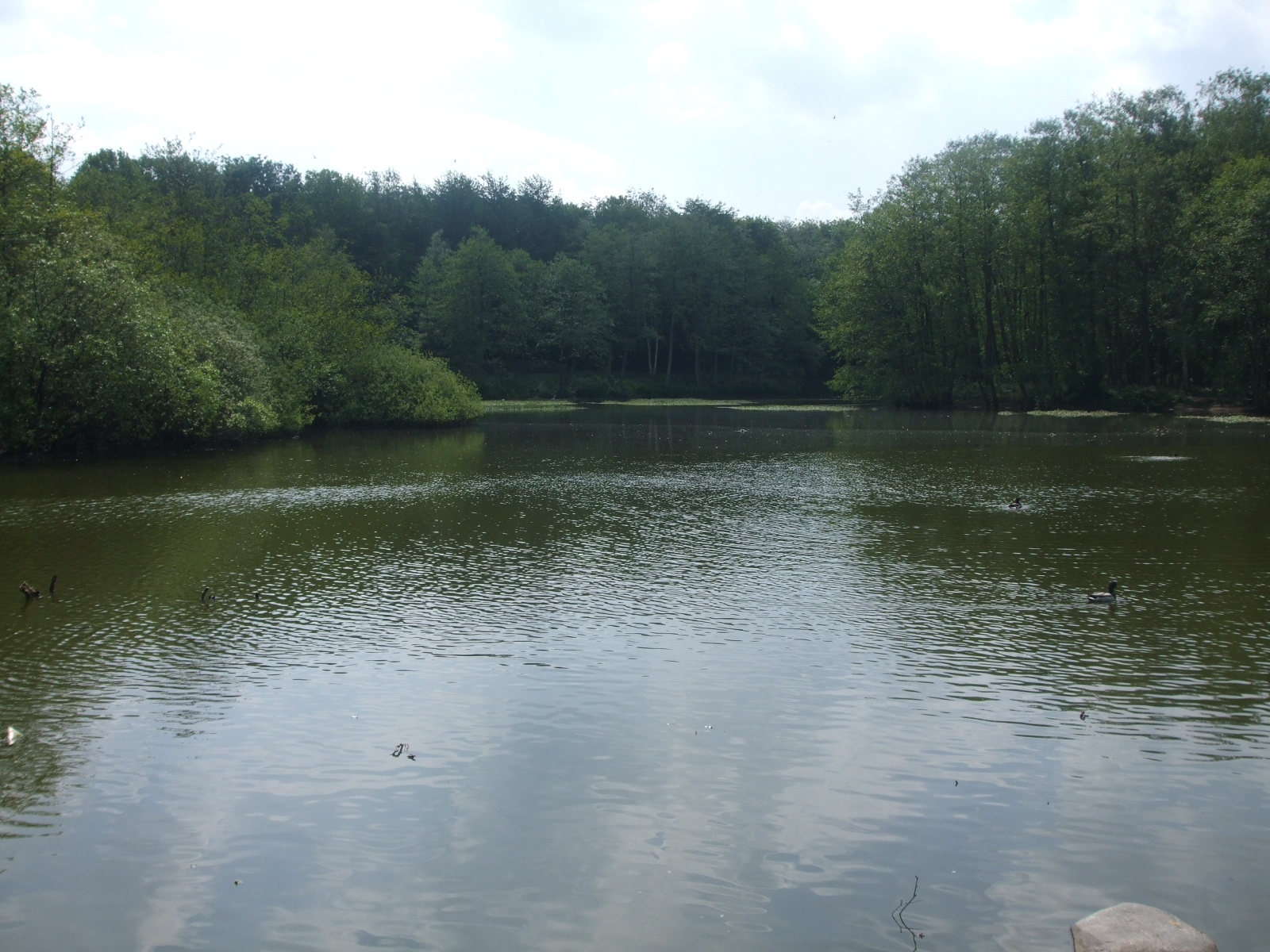
View of Thorsberg moor

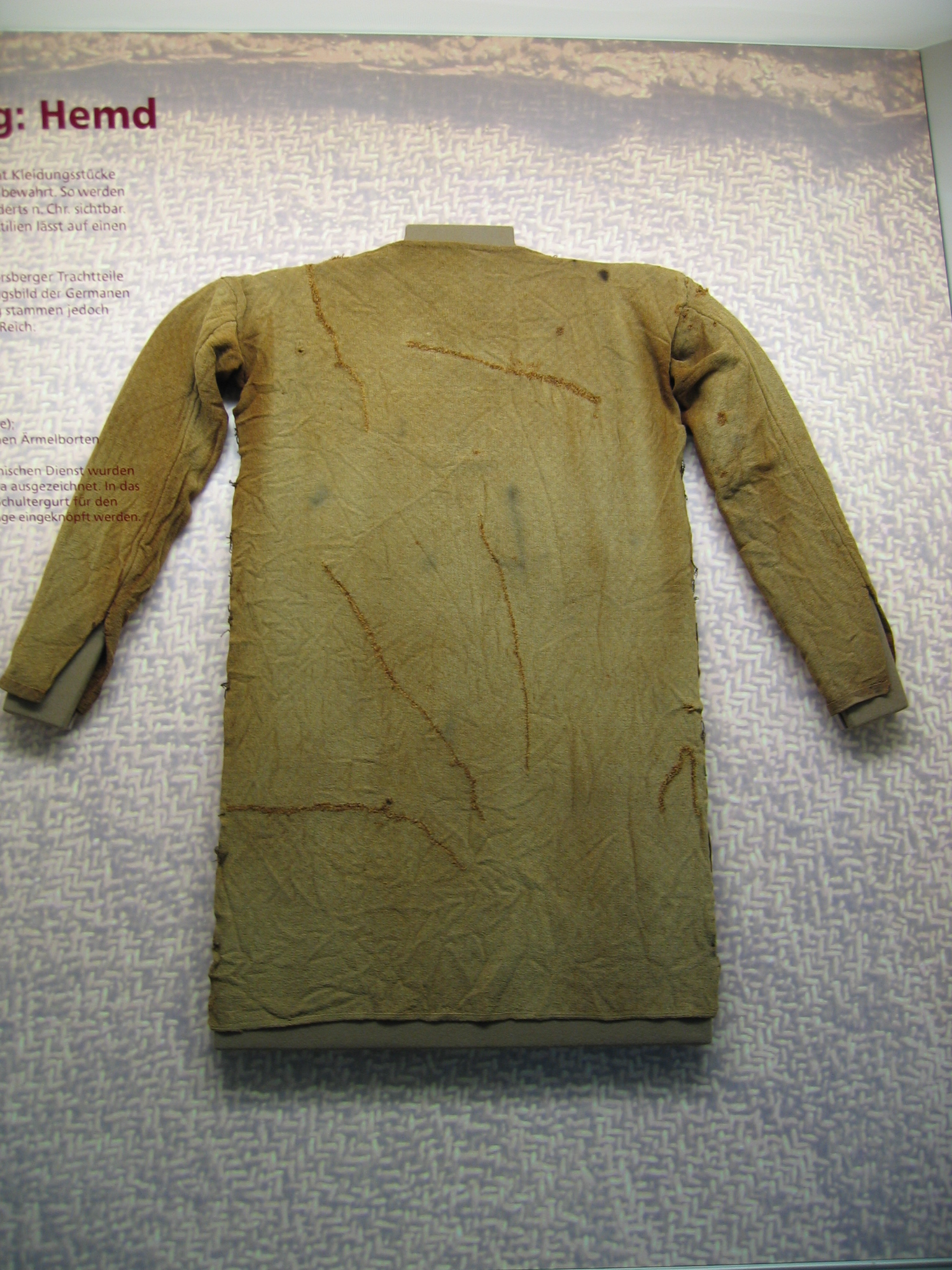
4th-century Germanic tunic found on Thorsberg moor

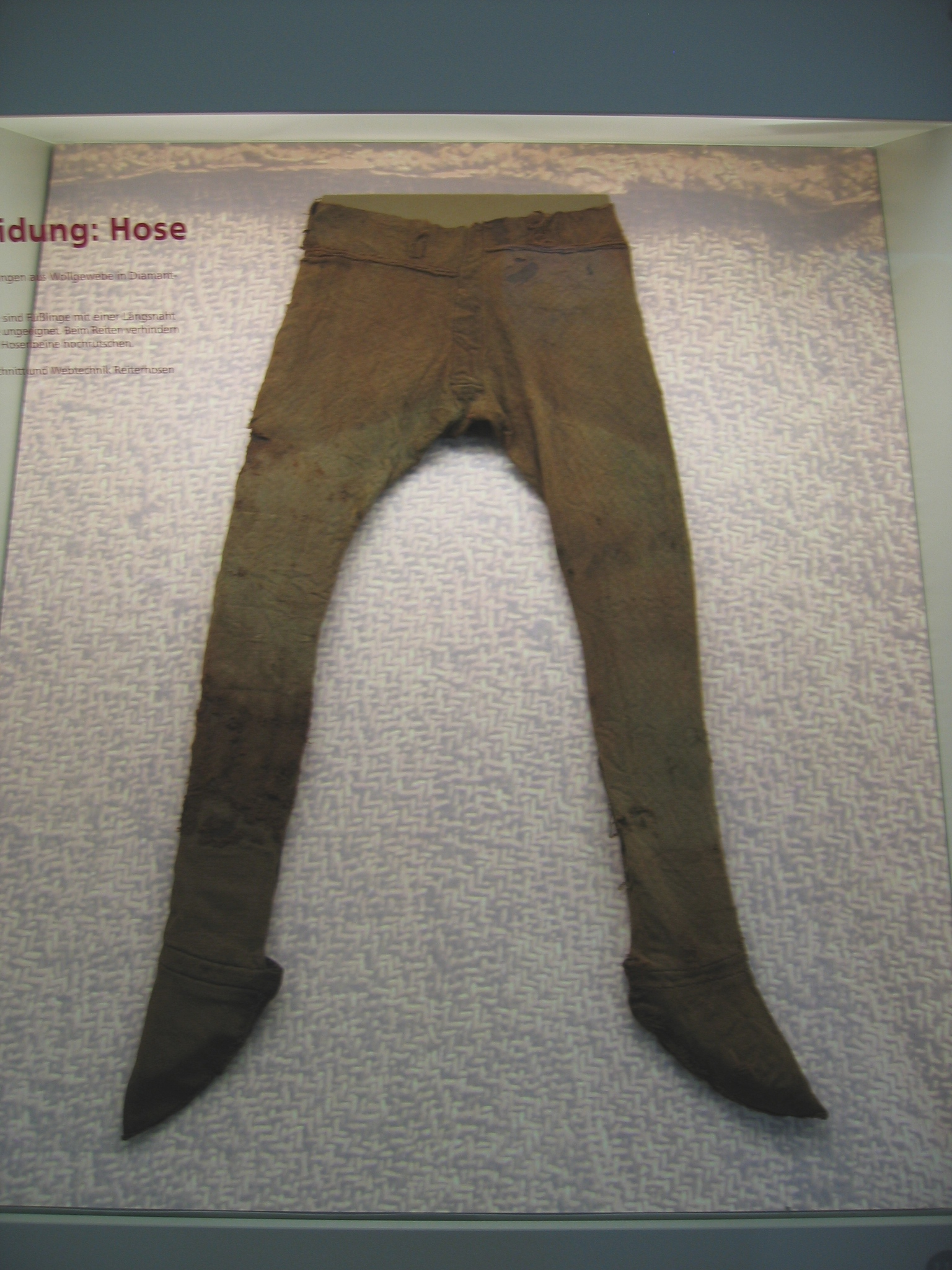
Trousers with attached socks found on Thorsberg moor

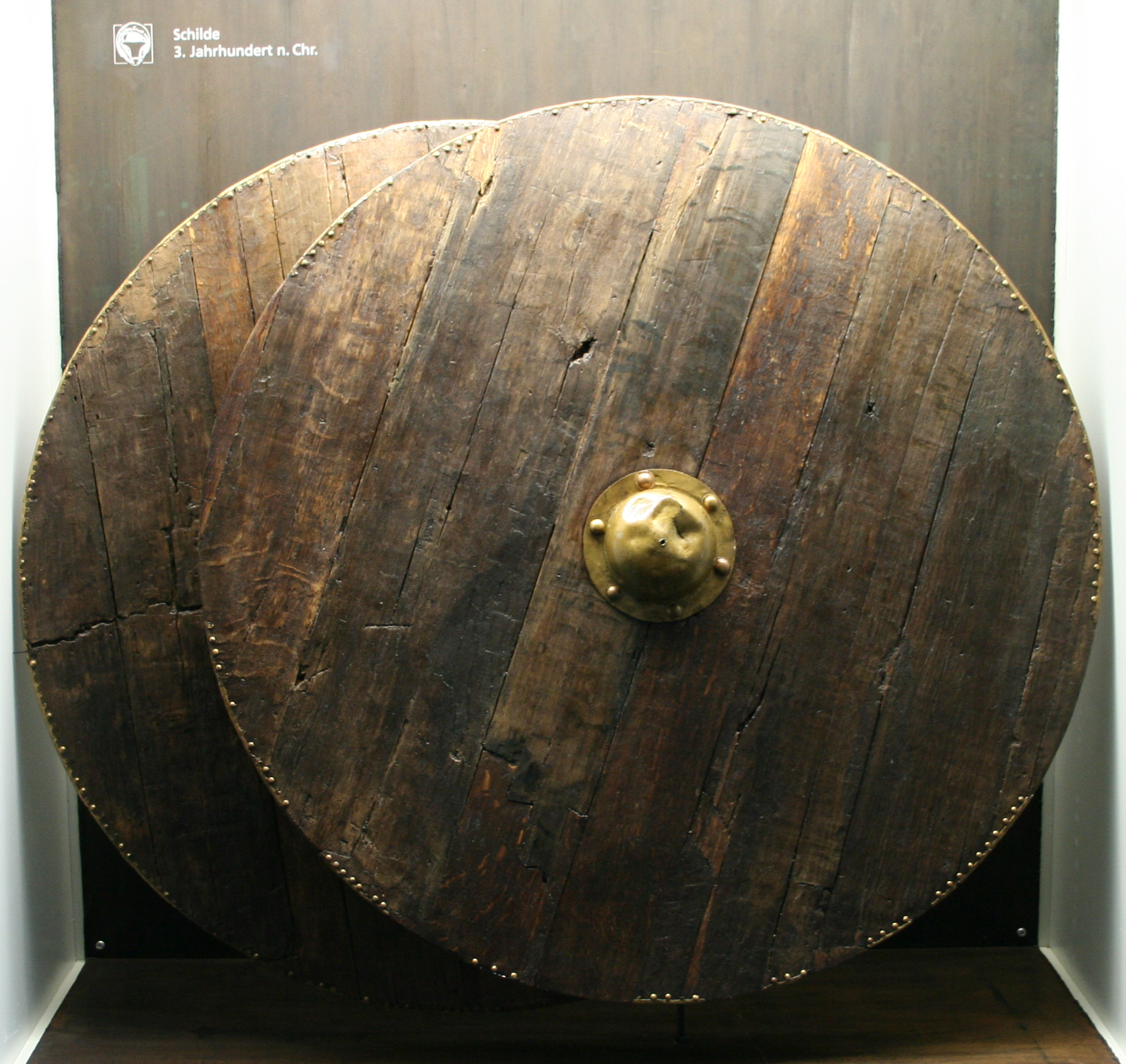
Two wooden round shields (3rd century AD)

The Thorsberg moor (German: Thorsberger Moor, Danish: Thorsberg Mose or Thorsbjerg Mose, South Jutlandic: Tosbarch, Tåsbjerre "Thor's hill") near Süderbrarup in Anglia, Schleswig-Holstein, Germany, is a peat bog in which the Angles deposited votive offerings for approximately four centuries. It is the location of important Roman Iron Age finds, including early Elder Futhark runic inscriptions such as the Thorsberg chape, a Roman helmet, a shield buckle, and an early example of socks (attached to trousers). The finds are of similar importance as the contemporaneous finds from Illerup and Vimose in Denmark.

== Excavation ==
The moor was excavated in 1858–1861 by a teacher from Flensburg, Helvig Conrad Engelhardt. The objects recovered by Engelhardt are on exhibit in the state museum of archaeology at Gottorf Castle; another 500 finds are on exhibit in the National Museum of Denmark in Copenhagen.

== Discoveries ==
The deposits were made from approximately 100 BC to 500 AD and are clearly votive in nature. However, it is doubtful that they were dedicated specifically to Thor. The placename may reflect worship of Thor there by Danes during the Viking Age rather than by Angles during the Roman Iron Age. And as Engelhardt noted, although the 'Thor's hammer' symbol occurs on several finds from the site, it is a motif that can be found in many non-Germanic contexts, even on Native American artefacts. They include early examples of clothing, both Germanic and Roman, in particular the footed trousers, which are commonly dated to the 4th century but which now appear to be no later than 300 AD; objects of Roman workmanship including two phaleræ, military decorations in the form of richly decorated gold discs 13.2 cm (5.2 in) in diameter made in the 3rd century in the workshop of Saciro, thought to have been near Cologne, which have the image of a seated man with a spear, possibly a representation of Mars; and objects of Germanic workmanship, notably the Thorsberg chape, a piece of a scabbard bearing one of the earliest inscriptions in runes.

Some of the Germanic fibulæ and shield bosses of ultimately Roman origin appear to be from Germanic tribes in Greater Germania, who were in closer contact with the Romans than the Angles. After approximately 200 AD, the deposition of weapons increased, possibly as a result of conflict between tribes such as the Marcomannic war (166 to 180 AD). Many of the objects deposited, especially the weapons, have been made useless by breaking, bending, etc. It was common practice among Celtic peoples to ritually "kill" such weapons.

In addition to the weapons and other man-made objects, the deposits in the bog include isolated bones. Just outside the moor is an Iron Age tumulus with a stone circle.

== See also ==
- Weapons sacrifice
- Wetlands and islands in Germanic paganism
