= Loit (disambiguation) =

Loit may refer to:

- Loit, a municipality in Schleswig-Holstein, Germany
- Aleksander Loit (1925–2021), Estonian-born Swedish historian
- Émilie Loit (born 1979), French professional female tennis player
- Meelis Loit (born 1971), Estonian fencer
