= Bolko Bullerdiek =

German writer

Bolko Bullerdiek (Mbozi, Tanzania, 9 January 1939) is a German author writing in Low Saxon (also known as Low German, Plattdüütsch) who has helped promote the teaching of Low Saxon in German schools, particularly in Hamburg.

== Youth and education ==
Bullerdiek was born in 1939 on Moravian mission station Rungwe near Tukuyu, Tanzania (then Tanganyika), where his father was a workman. Tanganyika was then a British colony where many Germans remained from the time the territory had been part of German East Africa. In World War II his father was interned by the British; later the family were compelled to leave Tanganyika and return to Germany. His father subsequently joined the Wehrmacht and was killed in action in North Africa.

Bullerdiek grew up in Bookholzberg, currently in the municipality of Ganderkesee in Lower Saxony. His mother provided for herself and her two sons by working as a seamstress. Bullerdiek picked up the Low Saxon language passively, later saying: "Plattdüütsch is de Spraak von mien Mudder, man nich mien Mudderspraak" (Low Saxon is my mother's language, but not my mother tongue). He trained as an industrial clerk at the commercial school in Delmenhorst. As this vocation was not to his liking, he returned to school, first obtaining a school leaving certificate in Oldenburg, then training as a teacher in Hamburg. Here he taught literature, German and politics at a vocational school for ten years. Next, he worked in teacher training and as director of studies for 28 years at the Landesinstitut für Lehrerbildung und Schulentwicklung. He has written textbooks for the study of German.

Bullerdiek has two adult daughters and divides his time between Hamburg, his main residence, and Gunneby in the municipality of Ulsnis, Schleswig-Holstein.

== Low Saxon work ==
Bullerdiek has published several Low Saxon short story collections. He has also contributed to publications for teaching Low Saxon literature, such as the anthology Schrievwark (2004) for schools in Hamburg. He helped give an impulse to the teaching of Low Saxon in schools, which spread to other federal states in Northern Germany after the example of the city of Hamburg. He is active in Quickborn, the Hamburg association for Low Saxon language and literature, and has contributed columns to newspapers. He occasionally has engagements as a Low Saxon storyteller.

Bullerdiek has received several prizes for his efforts on behalf of the Low Saxon language and Low Saxon literature. In 1993 he received the Freudenthal Prize, handed out annually for Low Saxon literature since 1956. This was followed in 1995 by the Fritz Reuter Prize. He was repeatedly among the winners of the Vertell-doch-mal competition held by North German broadcaster NDR, including in 2000 with his story "Vun'n Kurs af oder: Dat eerste Mal." In 2016 he received the Borsla Prize and in 2018 the town of Kappeln conferred its Low Saxon literary prize on him in recognition of his life's work.

== Bibliography ==
- Blangenbi - und doch weit weg. Lyrik in Gegenüberstellung Platt/Hoch (Quickborn-Verlag, Hamburg 1989)
- Einmischungen. Anregungen zu einem produktiven Umgang mit Lyrik und Kurzprosa (1991)
- Grimms Märchen - plattdüütsch vertellt (with Hanna Jebe, Hans Heinrich Jebe, Lisa Lühmann and Gerda Rudolph, Quickborn-Verlag, Hamburg 1991)
- Grimms weitere Märchen - plattdüütsch vertellt (with Alfred Feldhaus, Hanna Jebe, Hans Heinrich Jebe, Lisa Lühmann, Waltraut Otte, Gerda Rudolph and Hayo Schütte, Quickborn-Verlag, Hamburg 1991)
- Tohuus un annerwegens (Hinstörp-Verlag, Rostock 1991)
- Windhaken (verhalen, Hinstörp-Verlag, Rostock 1994)
- Distelblöden. Plattdüütsche Satiren & Glossen (Hinstörp-Verlag, Rostock 1995)
- Koppheister. Plattdüütsch för Lütt un Groot (Quickborn-Verlag, Hamburg 2001)
- Swartsuer. Ton Gräsen, Gruveln, Grienen. (horror stories, with Dirk Römmer, Hinstörp-Verlag, Rostock 2002)
- Schrievwark. Plattdeutsche Literatur im Deutschunterricht Hamburger Schulen (editor, includes 2 CDs, Quickborn-Verlag, Hamburg 2004)
- Buten is dat koolt. Geschichten ton Opwarmen (stories, Quickborn-Verlag, Hamburg 2006)
- Dat Verspreken (Plaggenhauer, 2007)
- Vör dien egen Döör (Quickborn-Verlag, Hamburg, 2009)
- Fundsoken. Geschichten von güstern un vondoog (stories, Quickborn-Verlag, Hamburg 2014)
- Bullerdiek sien Buddelbreven: Vertellen un Gedichten (stories and poems, Quickborn-Verlag, Hamburg 2018)
