= Kragehul I =

Lance-shaft from migration period found in Funen, Denmark

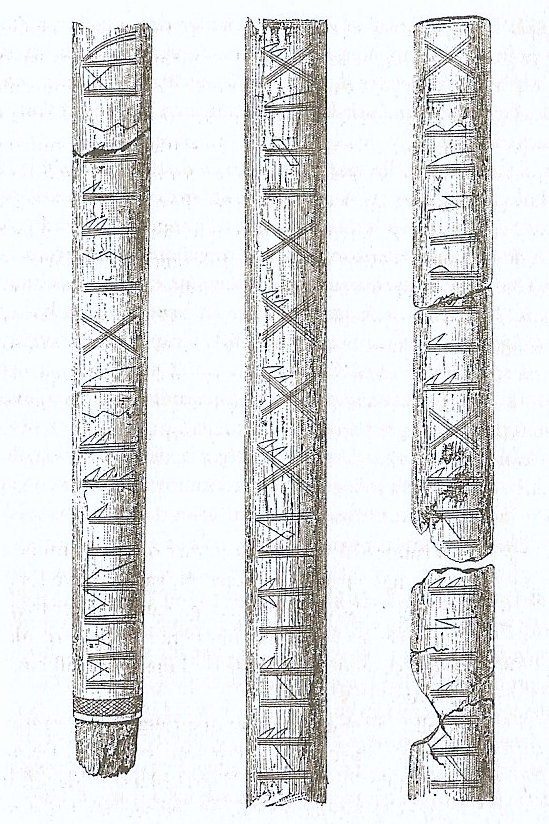
The Kragehul lance shaft. Drawn by Stephens in 1884.

Kragehul I (DR 196 U) is a migration period lance-shaft found on Funen, Denmark. It is now in the collection of the National Museum of Denmark, Copenhagen, Denmark. The spear shaft was found in 1877 during the excavation of the classic war booty sacrificial site Kragehul on southern Funen. The site holds five deposits of military equipment from the period 200 to 475 AD. The spear shaft probably belongs to the latest deposit.

== Inscription ==
The Elder Futhark inscription reads:

ek e=rila=z asugisalas m=uh=a h=aite g=ag=ag=a ginu g=ah=e … lija … hagala wiju big– …

The first part is normalized as:

ek erilaz āsugīs^{a}las muha haitē, gagaga

Interpreted as "I, the erilaz of Āsugīsalaz, am called Muha, ga-ga-ga!", where "ga-ga-ga" may be some sort of ritual chant or battle cry. Āsugīsalaz is a Germanic compound name, consisting of ansu-, "god", and gīs^{a}laz, "hostage". Muha also appears to be a personal name. The runes of gagaga are displayed as a row of three bindrunes based on the X-shape of the g-rune with sidetwigs attached to its extremities for the a. A similar sequence gægogæ is found on the Undley bracteate.

== Interpretations ==
The gagaga and the remaining part of the inscriptions have prompted varying interpretations.

=== Schneider ===
Schneider (1969) opts for bull sacrifice, reading g-a as "gift, god!" and the remaining as

Ginugahelija Hagala wiju bi g[aia].
"the mighty roarer [the sacrificial bull], the Hagal, I dedicate to the spear".

=== Düwel ===
Düwel (1983) reads the thrice repeated g-a as g[ibu] a[uja] "I give good fortune". For the second part of the inscription, he has

ginu-ga he[lmat]lija ... hag?l(a) wi[g]ju bi g[aia].
"magical-"ga", the helmet-destroying hail I dedicate to the spear"

=== Pieper ===
Pieper (1999) reads g-a as g[ebu] a[nsu] "gift to the god [Odin]", with following

ginu-ga hellija hag?la wiju bi g[ebu].
"magical-god-gift, hellish hail I dedicate upon this gift"

=== MacLeod and Mees ===
MacLeod and Mees (2006) read gagaga as an onomatopoeia related to forms like the Undley bracteate's gægogæ, and read the expression as a metrical charm

gagaga ginu gahellija, hagala wiju bi g[aize].
"gagaga I yell resoundingly, hail I dedicate in the s[pear]"

== See also ==
- Æsir
- Illerup Ådal
- Roman Iron Age weapon deposits
- Runic alphabet
- Weapons sacrifice
