= Amateur radio propagation beacon =

Radio beacon used in amateur radio

An amateur radio propagation beacon is a radio beacon, whose purpose is the investigation of the propagation of radio signals. Most radio propagation beacons use amateur radio frequencies. They can be found on LF, MF, HF, VHF, UHF, and microwave frequencies. Microwave beacons are also used as signal sources to test and calibrate antennas and receivers.

The International Amateur Radio Union (IARU) and its member societies coordinate beacons established by radio amateurs.

Propagation beacon 4U1UN, transmitting from the headquarters of the United Nations in New York

== Transmission characteristics ==
Most beacons operate in continuous wave (A1A) and transmit their identification (call sign and location). Some of them send long dashes to facilitate signal strength measurement. A small number of beacons transmit Morse code by frequency-shift keying (F1A). A few beacons transmit signals in digital modulation modes, like radioteletype (F1B) and PSK31 (G1B).

== Legality ==
In the US, unattended beacons on frequencies lower than the 10-meter band (~28 MHz) are not legal.

== 2200-meter beacons ==
Amateur experiments in the 2200-meter band (135.7–137.8 kHz) often involve operating temporary beacons.

== 1750-meter beacons ==
In the United States and Canada, unlicensed experimenters ("LowFERs") establish low power beacons on radio frequencies between 160 kHz and 190 kHz.

== 160-meter beacons ==
The International Amateur Radio Union Region 2 (North and South America) bandplan for the 160-meter band reserves the range 1999 kHz to 2000 kHz for propagation beacons.

== 10-meter beacons ==
Most high frequency radio propagation beacons are found in the 10-meter band (28 MHz), where they are good indicators of Sporadic E ionospheric propagation. According to IARU bandplans, the following 28 MHz frequencies are allocated to radio propagation beacons:

IARU Region	Beacon Sub-bands (MHz)
R1	28.190–28.199 Regional time-shared; 28.199–28.201 The International Beacon Project; 28.201–28.225 Continuous duty
R2	28.190–28.199 Regional time-shared; 28.199–28.201 The International Beacon Project; 28.201–28.225 Beacons, continuous duty; 28.225–28.300 Shared
R3	28.190–28.200 The International Beacon Project

== 6-meter beacons ==
Due to unpredictable and intermittent long-distance propagation, usually achieved by a combination of ionospheric conditions, beacons are very important in providing early warning for 6-meter band (50 MHz) openings. Beacons traditionally operate in the lower part of the band, in the range 50.000 MHz to 50.080 MHz.

IARU Region 1 is encouraging individual beacons to move to 50.4 MHz to 50.5 MHz. In the United States, the Federal Communications Commission (FCC) only permits unattended 6-meter beacon stations to operate between 50.060 and 50.080 MHz.

Amateur beacons at 50 MHz have also been used as signal sources for academic propagation research

== 4-meter beacons ==
Several countries in ITU Region 1 have access to frequencies in the 70 MHz region, called the 4-meter band. The band shares many propagation characteristics with 6 meters. The preferred location for beacons is 70.000–70.090 MHz; however, in countries where this segment is not allocated to Amateur Radio, beacons may operate elsewhere in the band.

=== United States ===
Brian Justin, WA1ZMS, of Forest, Virginia, applied for an experimental license to operate a propagation beacon on 4m with the FCC in January 2010. It was approved, and at 1200 UTC on Monday, May 3, 2010, the beacon went operational under the callsign WE9XFT. The beacon sits on Apple Orchard Mountain (4200 feet above sea level), a mountain along the Blueridge Parkway in Maidenhead grid square FM07fm, near Bedford, Virginia. Because there is no amateur band on 70 MHz in the United States, the beacon runs 24 hours a day under a non-amateur experimental license.

Justin told the ARRL that he had no plans to introduce the 4-meter band to the United States, despite the fact that numerous European governments allow amateurs rights on the band. He said, "This beacon is solely for radio scientific usage as an E-skip detecting device"

On 70.005 MHz, WE9XFT is transmitting 3 kW ERP to Europe. At the same location, Justin runs a 144 MHz remote-controlled transmitter, WA1ZMS. It is GPS locked and uses two 5-element stacked Yagis beaming at 60 degrees with a 500 W transmitter running at 7 kW ERP. Both signals are audible in the United States and Europe.

== VHF/UHF beacons ==
Beacons on 144 MHz and higher frequencies are mainly used to identify tropospheric radio propagation openings. It is not uncommon for VHF and UHF beacons to use directional antennas. Frequencies set aside for beacons on VHF and UHF bands vary widely in different ITU regions and countries.

Band	Beacon Sub-band (MHz)		
Band	ITU Region 1	ITU Region 2	ITU Region 3
2 m	144.400–144.491	144.275–144.300	none
1.25 m	—N/a	222.050–222.060	—N/a
70 cm	432.400–432.490	432.300–432.400	none
33 cm	—N/a	903.000–903.100	—N/a
23 cm	1,296.800–1,296.994	1,296.200–1,296.400	none
13 cm	2,320.800–2,321.000	2,304.300–2,304.400	2,304.300–2,304.400

The beacon sub-bands in the United Kingdom also reflect IARU Region 1 recommendations.

== SHF/microwave beacons ==
In addition to identifying propagation, microwave beacons are also used as signal sources to test and calibrate antennas and receivers. SHF beacons are not as common as beacons on the lower bands, and beacons above the 3-centimeter band (10 GHz) are unusual.

Band	Beacon Sub-band (MHz)		
Band	ITU Region 1	ITU Region 2	ITU Region 3
9 cm	3,400.800–3,400.995	3,456.300–3,457.000	3,456.300–3,457.000
5 cm	5,760.800–5,760.990	5,760.300–5,761.000	5,760.300–5,761.000
3 cm	10,368.800–10,368.990	10,368.300–10,368.400	10.368.300–10.368.400
1.2 cm	24,048.800–24,048.995	24,048.750–24,048.995	24,048.750–24,048.995

== Beacon Projects and Specialized Beacons ==
Most radio propagation beacons are operated by individual radio amateurs or amateur radio societies and clubs. As a result, there are frequent additions and deletions to the lists of beacons. There are, however a few major projects coordinated by organizations like the International Amateur Radio Union (IARU).

=== IARU Beacon Project ===
Beacons from Finland and Madeira on 14.100 MHz

The International Beacon Project (IBP), which is coordinated by the Northern California DX Foundation and the International Amateur Radio Union, consists of 18 high frequency propagation beacons worldwide, which transmit in turns on 14.100 MHz, 18.110 MHz, 21.150 MHz, 24.930 MHz, and 28.200 MHz.

=== DARC Beacon Project ===
The Deutscher Amateur-Radio-Club sponsors two beacons which transmit from Scheggerott, near Kiel ( JO44vq). These beacons are DRA5 on 5195 kHz and DK0WCY on 10144 kHz. In addition to identification and location, every 10 minutes, these beacons transmit solar and geomagnetic bulletins. Transmissions are in Morse code for aural reception, RTTY and PSK31. DK0WCY operates also a limited service beacon on 3579 kHz at 0720–0900 and 1600–1900 local time.

=== RSGB 5 MHz Beacon Project ===
The Radio Society of Great Britain operates a radio propagation beacon GB3ORK on 5290 kHz, transmitting every 15 minutes commencing at 2 minutes past the hour. It is located in the Orkney Islands ( IO89ja).

=== The GB3RAL VHF Beacon Cluster ===
GB3RAL, which is located at the Rutherford Appleton Laboratory, transmits continuously on a number of low-band and mid-band VHF frequencies – 40050, 50050, 60050 and 70050 kHz – as well as 28215 kHz in the 10-meter amateur band.

=== Weak Signal Propagation Reporter Network (WSPR) ===
A large-scale beacon project is underway using the WSPR transmission scheme included with the WSJT software suite. The loosely coordinated beacon transmitters and receivers, collectively known as the WSPRnet, report the real-time propagation characteristics of a number of frequency bands and geographical locations via the Internet. The WSPRnet website provides detailed propagation report databases and real-time graphical maps of propagation paths.

=== Synchronized Beacon Project ===
The Synchronized Beacon Project (SBP) is an effort to deploy coordinated beacon transmitters on 50 MHz using a one-minute transmitting sequence of PI4, CW, and unmodulated carrier. Since modern beacon transmitters are multi-mode and frequency-agile, beacons that normally transmit on other time-multiplexed modes such as WSPR can take part in the SBP when not transmitting in their primary mode. Beacons alternating between frequencies on the same band should sign CALL/S when transmitting on the SBP frequency to ensure unique entries in band-specific propagation report databases.

=== High Power Beacons ===
In the United States, the FCC allows a maximum power output of 100W PEP for beacons. 2M Beacons typically run lower power (QRP) in operation, however a few stations have significantly more power at 50W PEP at the middle of the power output limit. Two stations transmit at or near the power limit top end. The WA7X Beacon, in Grid DM49ho, is the listed as the beacon transmitting at 100W EICRP.

The KR4GPI 2M Beacon, in Grid FM08ug, transmits at 70W PEP and 413W ERP is the most powerful East of the Mississippi River, which is the FCC's dividing line for the country.

Higher power beacons in the 6M and higher bands are typically setup for regional coverage as opposed to local, and for propagation research and band openings. As Parks on the Air and Summits on the Air gain in popularity, these beacons can assist in determining if activators and hunters can work certain activation sites.

Specialized Beacons

Specialized beacons utilizing emissions other than CW can be found as well. In the 10M Band, two stations, SV6DBG and KR4GPI, operate beacons transmitting RTTY 45.45.

The SV6DBG beacon transmits low power (QRP) 28269 kHz and 1.5W PEP from Grid KM09kq.

The KR4GPI beacon transmits at full output power on a IARU Coordinated Frequency of 28292 kHz and 100W PEP / 1.9kW ERP from Grid FM08ug. The beacon transmits via a fixed Moxon Antenna orientated at 50 Degrees. At this orientation, the beacon signal encompasses the heavily populated East Coast Corridor and New England areas of the United States including Washington DC and New York City. In Europe, the signal path roughly extends to Paris and the West Coast of France.

At this fixed orientation of the two beacons, the signal path aligns with both SV6DBG and KR4GPI allowing for a unique beacon signal path by HF stations, SWL stations and beacon hunters on both sides of the North Atlantic.

== See also ==
- Ionosonde
- Electric beacon
- OZ7IGY – the world's oldest beacon
