= Spear bow =

Type of Bow

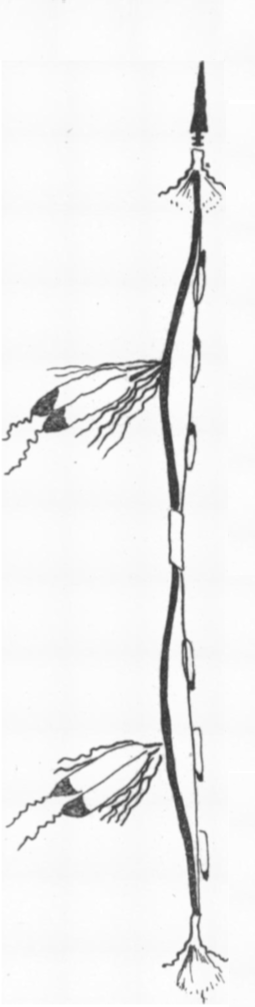
A Lakota bow lance with an iron point. The string features white ratskin and eagle downs, the bow arms eagle feathers, and the ends owl feathers.

A spear bow, or bow lance, is a type of longbow equipped with a speartip or bayonet at the end of the upper bow arm, allowing the user to utilize it as a spear wheen needed, such as a backup weapon. When strung, the bow acts like a curved spear, which akin to a curved sword can work around a shield or other defense. When unstrung, the bow straightens out and works more like a normal spear.

Spear bows exist all over the world throughout history.

== Japan ==
In Japan, two principles of spear bow have existed. One principle was to fit a dedicated socketed bayonet, called hazuyari (Japanese: 弭槍, はずやり, lit. 'end pike'), to the end of the bow. Another was to tie an uchine throwing dart (Japanese: 打根, うちね, lit. 'throwing root') to the end of a bow in some improvised manner.

== North America ==
In North America, long spear bows, called bow lances, were used by the Lakota people.

== Scandinavia ==
In 1859, Danish archeologist Conrad Engelhardt excavated two Migration Period spear bows in Nydam Mose, Denmark, dating to 250–400 AD; one with an iron tip and the other with an antler tip. Later on, out of forty bows found in Nydam, eight were spear bows.

A Sámi spear bow from later on has also been found by German archeologist Harm Paulsen.
