= Brebel =

Village in Schleswig-Holstein, Germany

Brebel Bredbøl
- Ortsteil of Süderbrarup
- Coat of arms
- Interactive map of Brebel; Bredbøl
- Location within Germany Location within Schleswig-Holstein
- Coordinates: 54°37′N 9°45′E
- Country: Germany
- State: Schleswig-Holstein
- District: Schleswig-Flensburg
- Municipality: Süderbrarup

Area
  - Total: 6.96 km^{2} (2.69 sq mi)
- Elevation: 19 m (62 ft)

Population (2016-12-31)
  - Total: 396
  - Density: 56.9/km^{2} (147/sq mi)
- Time zone: UTC+01:00 (CET)
  - Summer (DST): UTC+02:00 (CEST)
- Postal codes: 24392
- Dialling codes: 04641
- Vehicle registration: SL
- Website: www.suederbrarup.de

Brebel (Danish: Bredbøl) is a former municipality in the district of Schleswig-Flensburg, in Schleswig-Holstein, Germany. Since March 2018, it is part of the municipality Süderbrarup. Brebel is diveded into for four parts: The village of Groß-Brebel (Danish: Store Bredbøl) and the hamlets of Klein-Brebel (Danish: Lille Bredbøl), Brebelholz (Danish: Bredbølskov) and Loitstraße (Danish: Løjtgade).

== History ==
Brebel was first mentioned in King Valdemar's land register in 1231 as Brethæbøl. In 1799, the village got a school. In the years 1908 to 1969 there was a dairy in Brebel. Brebel has developed from a farming village into an almost purely residential area.

The place name is a combination of Danish bred for broad and -bøl for settlement, hence the meaning is roughly broad settlement.

On March 1, 2018, the previously independent municipality of Brebel was incorporated into Süderbrarup.

== Politics ==
Out of the nine seats in the last municipal council, the KWB voters' association had six seats since the 2013 local elections and the BfB voters' association had three. The last mayor was Wolfhard Kutz (KWB).

=== Coat of Arms ===
Blazon : “In gold below between two blue wavy bars a blue wavy thread, above a green four-leaf clover with an applied golden crosshair as leaf veins”.

The cloverleaf in Brebel's coat of arms reflects the four districts of Brebelholz, Groß Brebel, Klein Brebel and Loitstraße. In its simplicity, it also radiates harmony between the districts. The crosshairs represent the road junction in the town center formed by the state and federal roads . This "long-distance traffic junction" is important for Brebel's economic development. At the same time, it expresses the population's openness in all directions. The wavy bars in the base of the shield represent the watercourses that flow through and border the local area.

== Literature ==
- O. Nielsen: Liber Census Daniæ. Kong Valdemar den Andens Jordebog; G.E.C. Gads forlag, København 1873

== Economy ==
Brebel is changing from an agricultural town to a residential area.

== Notable People ==
- Theodor Ohlsen (1855–1913), Maler, wurde in Klein-Brebel geboren
- Rolf Andresen (1925–2008), Sportfunktionär, wurde in Brebelholz geboren
