= Süderbrarup (Amt) =

Amt in Schleswig-Holstein

- Amt
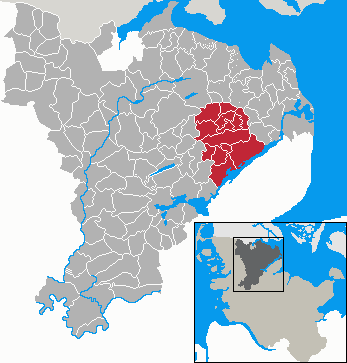
- Map of Schleswig-Flensburg highlighting Süderbrarup
- Interactive map of Süderbrarup
- Location within Germany Location within Schleswig-Holstein
- Coordinates: 54°38′N 9°46′E
- Country: Germany
- State: Schleswig-Holstein
- District: Schleswig-Flensburg
- Seat: Süderbrarup
- Subdivisions: 13 municipalities

Area
  - Total: 146.78 km^{2} (56.67 sq mi)

Population (2025-12-31)
  - Total: 11,422
  - Density: 77.817/km^{2} (201.55/sq mi)
- Time zone: UTC+01:00 (CET)
  - Summer (DST): UTC+02:00 (CEST)
- Vehicle registration: SL
- Website: www.amt-suederbrarup.de

Süderbrarup is an Amt ("collective municipality") in the district of Schleswig-Flensburg, in Schleswig-Holstein, Germany. The seat of the Amt is in Süderbrarup.

The Amt Süderbrarup consists of the following municipalities:

1. Böel
2. Boren
3. Loit
4. Mohrkirch
5. Norderbrarup
6. Nottfeld
7. Rügge
8. Saustrup
9. Scheggerott
10. Steinfeld
11. Süderbrarup
12. Ulsnis
13. Wagersrott
