= Dollrottfeld =

Dollrottfeld Dollerødmark
- Ortsteil of Süderbrarup
- Interactive map of Dollrottfeld; Dollerødmark
- Location within Germany Location within Schleswig-Holstein
- Coordinates: 54°37′N 9°49′E
- Country: Germany
- State: Schleswig-Holstein
- District: Schleswig-Flensburg
- Municipality: Süderbrarup

Area
  - Total: 4.99 km^{2} (1.93 sq mi)
- Elevation: 30 m (98 ft)

Population (2016-12-31)
  - Total: 271
  - Density: 54.3/km^{2} (141/sq mi)
- Time zone: UTC+01:00 (CET)
  - Summer (DST): UTC+02:00 (CEST)
- Postal codes: 24392
- Dialling codes: 04641
- Vehicle registration: SL
- Website: www.suederbrarup.de

Dollrottfeld (Danish: Dollerødmark) is a village and a former municipality in the district of Schleswig-Flensburg, in Schleswig-Holstein, Germany. Since March 2018, it is part of the municipality Süderbrarup.
