= Undley bracteate =

Coordinates: 52.40°N 00.48°E

- Material: gold
- Size: 2.3 cm (0.91 in) diameter
- Writing: Runic, Old English
- Created: 5th century
- Period/culture: Early Anglo-Saxon
- Discovered: Undley Common, near Lakenheath, Suffolk
- Present location: Room 41, British Museum, London
- Identification: H_1984-1101-1

The Undley bracteate is a 5th-century bracteate found in Undley Common, near Lakenheath, Suffolk. It bears the earliest known inscription that can be argued to be in Anglo-Frisian Futhorc (as opposed to Common Germanic Elder Futhark).

The image on the bracteate is an adaptation of an Urbs Roma coin type issued by Constantine the Great, conflating the helmeted head of the emperor and the image of Romulus and Remus suckled by the she-wolf on one face. With a diameter of 2.3 cm, it weighs 2.24 grams. It may have originated in northern Germany or southern Scandinavia and been brought to England with an early Anglo-Saxon settler.

The inscription reads right to left around the circumference of the obverse side, terminating at the image of the wolf:

ᚷ‍ᚫᚷ‍ᚩᚷ‍ᚫ ᛗᚫᚷᚫ ᛗᛖᛞᚢ
g͡æg͡og͡æ mægæ medu

The o is the earliest known instance of the os rune ᚩ contrasting with the æsc rune ᚫ. The three syllables of the initial word gægogæ are written as bind runes, with side-twigs attached to the X shape of the gyfu rune to represent the vowels æ and o.

The words mægæ medu are interpreted as meaning "med for the mæg", i.e. "reward for relatives", referring to the bracteate itself. The word gægogæ appears to be some magical invocation or battle cry, comparable to the g͡ag͡ag͡a on the Kragehul I lance-shaft.

== See also ==
- Kragehul I - Item from Denmark with a similar inscription
