= Böel =

Boel Bøl
- Municipality
- Coat of arms

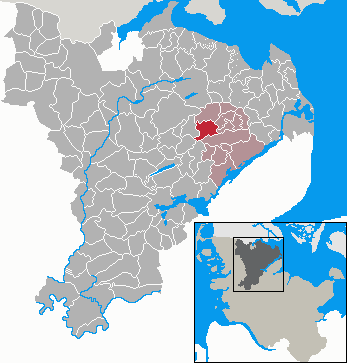
- Location of Boel; Bøl within Schleswig-Flensburg district
- Interactive map of Boel; Bøl
- Location within Germany Location within Schleswig-Holstein
- Coordinates: 54°38′N 9°43′E
- Country: Germany
- State: Schleswig-Holstein
- District: Schleswig-Flensburg
- Municipal assoc.: Süderbrarup

Government
  - Mayor: Rainer Stahmer

Area
  - Total: 13.66 km^{2} (5.27 sq mi)
- Elevation: 21 m (69 ft)

Population (2025-12-31)
  - Total: 703
  - Density: 51.5/km^{2} (133/sq mi)
- Time zone: UTC+01:00 (CET)
  - Summer (DST): UTC+02:00 (CEST)
- Postal codes: 24401
- Dialling codes: 04641 u. 04646
- Vehicle registration: SL
- Website: www.suederbrarup.de

Böel (German pronunciation: [bøːl]; Danish: Bøl) is a municipality in the district of Schleswig-Flensburg, in Schleswig-Holstein, Germany.
