= Steinfeld, Schleswig-Holstein =

Steinfeld Stenfelt
- Municipality
- Coat of arms

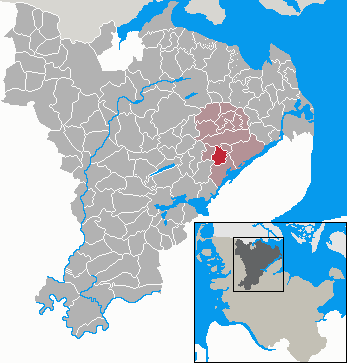
- Location of Steinfeld within Schleswig-Flensburg district
- Interactive map of Steinfeld
- Location within Germany Location within Schleswig-Holstein
- Coordinates: 54°36′N 9°45′E
- Country: Germany
- State: Schleswig-Holstein
- District: Schleswig-Flensburg
- Municipal assoc.: Süderbrarup

Government
  - Mayor: Wibke Uck

Area
  - Total: 8.73 km^{2} (3.37 sq mi)
- Elevation: 19 m (62 ft)

Population (2025-12-31)
  - Total: 810
  - Density: 93/km^{2} (240/sq mi)
- Time zone: UTC+01:00 (CET)
  - Summer (DST): UTC+02:00 (CEST)
- Postal codes: 24888
- Dialling codes: 04641
- Vehicle registration: SL
- Website: www.amt-suederbrarup.de

Steinfeld (German pronunciation: [ˈʃtaɪnˌfɛlt]; Danish: Stenfelt) is a municipality in the district of Schleswig-Flensburg, in Schleswig-Holstein, Germany.
