= Norderbrarup =

Norderbrarup Nørre Brarup
- Municipality
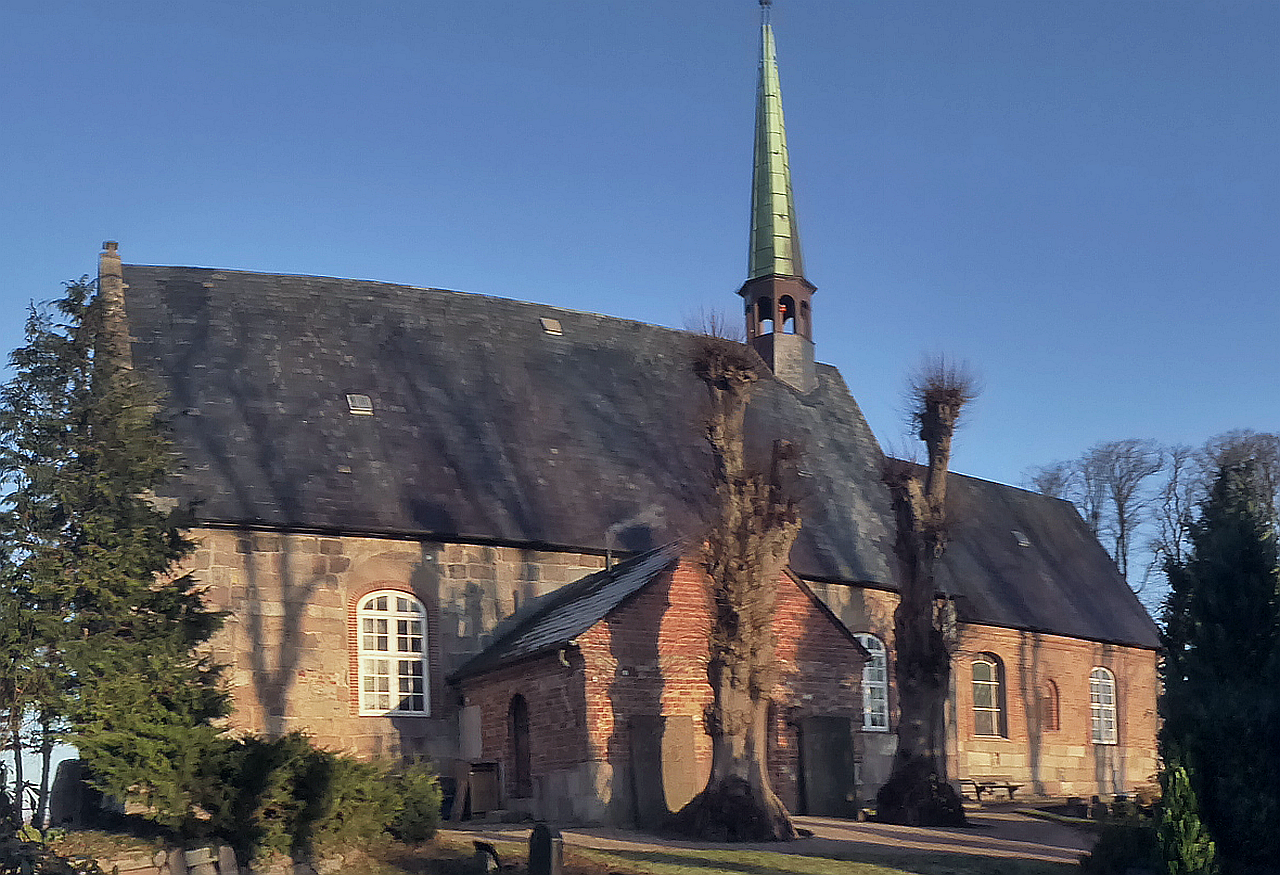
- Norderbrarup Church

- Coat of arms

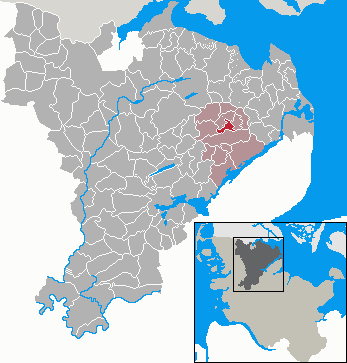
- Location of Norderbrarup; Nørre Brarup within Schleswig-Flensburg district
- Interactive map of Norderbrarup; Nørre Brarup
- Location within Germany Location within Schleswig-Holstein
- Coordinates: 54°38′N 9°46′E
- Country: Germany
- State: Schleswig-Holstein
- District: Schleswig-Flensburg
- Municipal assoc.: Süderbrarup

Government
  - Mayor: Wolf-Rüdiger Gramm (SPD)

Area
  - Total: 3.98 km^{2} (1.54 sq mi)
- Elevation: 19 m (62 ft)

Population (2025-12-31)
  - Total: 685
  - Density: 172/km^{2} (446/sq mi)
- Time zone: UTC+01:00 (CET)
  - Summer (DST): UTC+02:00 (CEST)
- Postal codes: 24392
- Dialling codes: 04641
- Vehicle registration: SL
- Website: www.suederbrarup.de

Norderbrarup (Danish: Nørre Brarup) is a municipality in the district of Schleswig-Flensburg, in Schleswig-Holstein, Germany.
