= Süderbrarup =

Süderbrarup Sønder Brarup
- Municipality
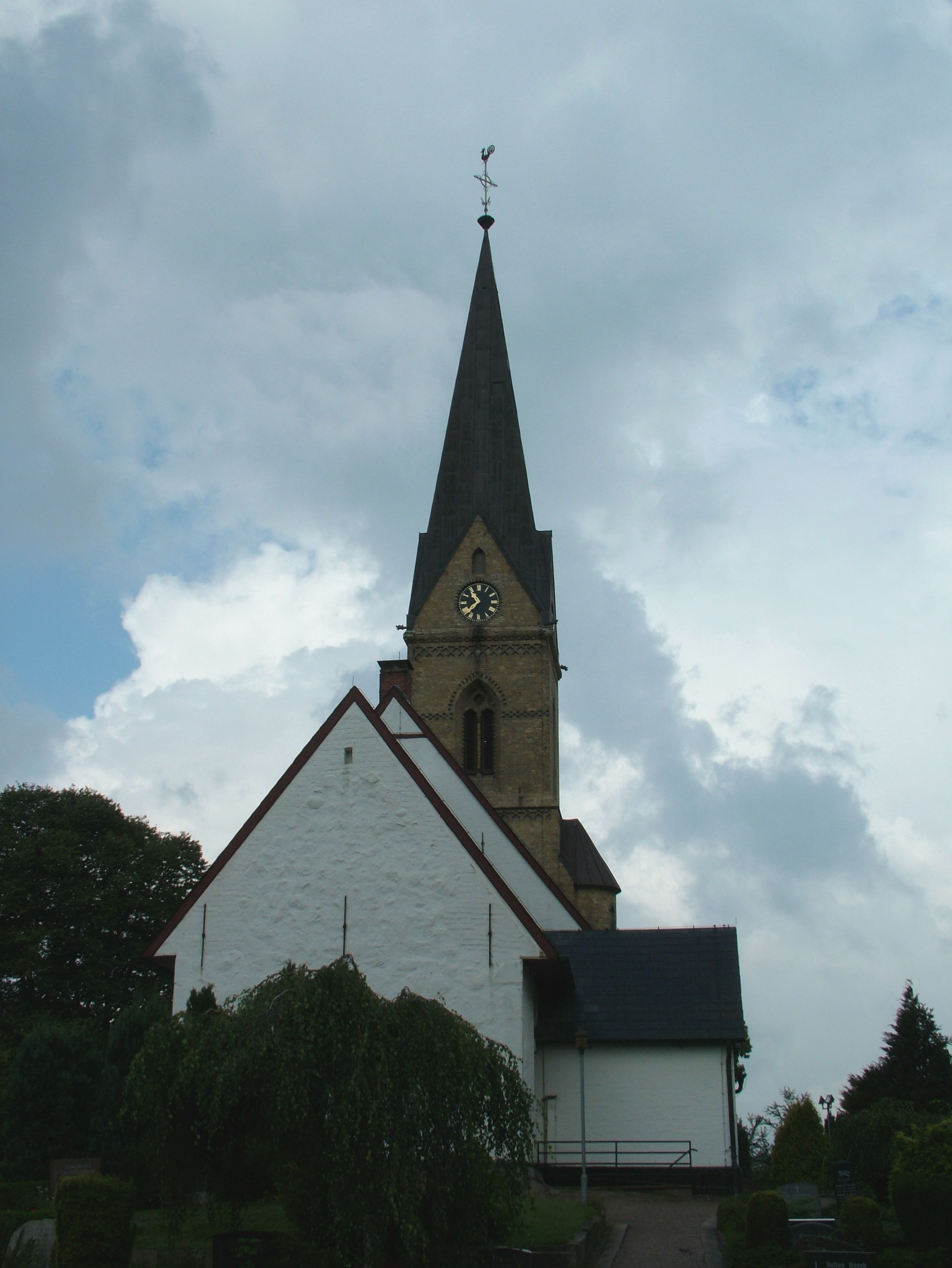

- Coat of arms

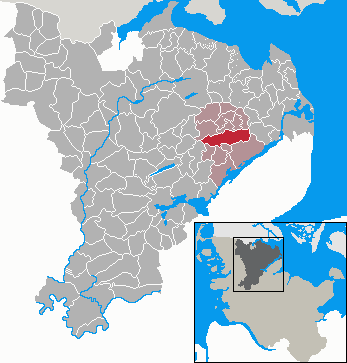
- Location of Süderbrarup within Schleswig-Flensburg district
- Interactive map of Süderbrarup
- Location within Germany Location within Schleswig-Holstein
- Coordinates: 54°38′21″N 9°46′23″E
- Country: Germany
- State: Schleswig-Holstein
- District: Schleswig-Flensburg
- Municipal assoc.: Süderbrarup

Government
  - Mayor: Friedrich Bennetreu (CDU)

Area
  - Total: 20.05 km^{2} (7.74 sq mi)
- Elevation: 28 m (92 ft)

Population (2025-12-31)
  - Total: 5,107
  - Density: 254.7/km^{2} (659.7/sq mi)
- Time zone: UTC+01:00 (CET)
  - Summer (DST): UTC+02:00 (CEST)
- Postal codes: 24392
- Dialling codes: 04641
- Vehicle registration: SL
- Website: www.suederbrarup.de

Süderbrarup (Danish: Sønder Brarup) is a municipality in the district of Schleswig-Flensburg, in Schleswig-Holstein, Germany. It is situated on the north side of the Schlei, approx. 20 km northeast of Schleswig, and 30 km southeast of Flensburg. Süderbrarup is known for the Thorsberg moor archeological site.

Süderbrarup is the seat of the Amt ("collective municipality") Süderbrarup. In March 2018 the former municipalities of Brebel and Dollrottfeld were merged into Süderbrarup.

== Events ==
=== Brarupmarkt ===
Heavily rooted in the German tradition of annual country fairs with rides (German: Jahrmarkt), Süderbrarup hosts the largest regional celebration of this kind in Schleswig-Holstein, drawing several hundred thousand visitors each year. Brarupmarkt has been an annual cornerstone of local culture since its inception in 1583. The commencement date for Brarupmarkt falls on the last complete weekend of July.

Brarupmarkt traditions

- Opening of Brarupmarkt by Mayor Friedrich Bennetreu and city hall council with commemorative auto scooter and Ferris wheel rides
- Livestock market
- Miss Brarupmarkt beauty pageant
- Karaoke competition
- Unauthorized after-hours skinny dipping in municipal pool by local youth
- "Frühschoppen", traditional morning pint

== References in popular media ==
=== Werner – Beinhart! (1990) ===
Despite its relatively small population of approx. 4,000 citizens, Süderbrarup was instantly catapulted into the limelight of the German cinema, due to an opening scene in German cartoonist Rötger Feldmann's infamous first full-length feature release "Werner – Beinhart!" in 1990. This wacky, shrewd cartoon depicts a local plumber's apprentice and full-time motorcycle rocker in his zany adventures at work and with his notoriously drunk colleagues. In the relevant scene of this animated feature, the protagonist observes an impromptu soccer match at the weekly farmer's market - sparked by mistake. Werner, comments the accidental match between the market's visitors referring to the players as part of the real local soccer teams TSV Süderbrarup and the regional rival soccer club from Holzbein Kiel ("Holzbein Kiel" - German for "Pegleg Kiel" - a pun on the real Holstein Kiel soccer club).

=== Sommer '04 an der Schlei ===
This film is situated near Süderbrarup. It's a drama with Martina Gedeck, Robert Seeliger, Svea Lohde and Peter Davor.
