= Wagersrott =

Wagersrott Vogsrød
- Municipality
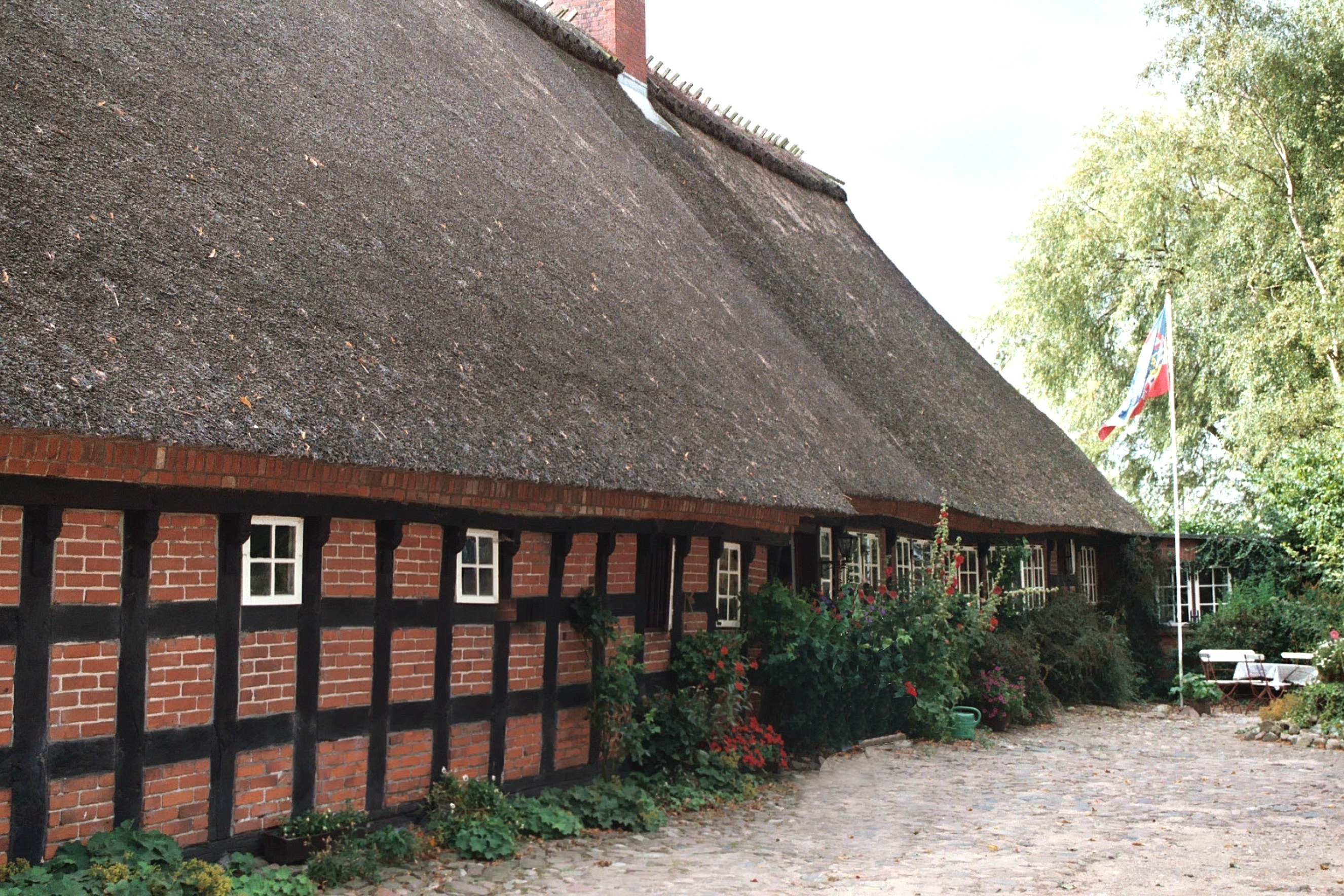
- Fachhallenhaus in Wagersrott

- Coat of arms

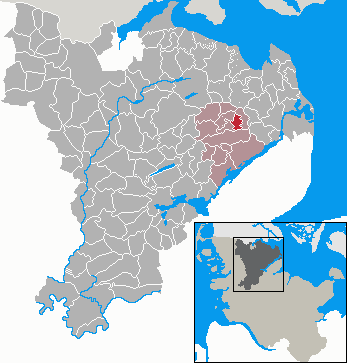
- Location of Wagersrott; Vogsrød within Schleswig-Flensburg district
- Interactive map of Wagersrott; Vogsrød
- Location within Germany Location within Schleswig-Holstein
- Coordinates: 54°40′N 9°48′E
- Country: Germany
- State: Schleswig-Holstein
- District: Schleswig-Flensburg
- Municipal assoc.: Süderbrarup

Government
  - Mayor: Georg Hansen

Area
  - Total: 5.64 km^{2} (2.18 sq mi)
- Elevation: 31 m (102 ft)

Population (2025-12-31)
  - Total: 233
  - Density: 41.3/km^{2} (107/sq mi)
- Time zone: UTC+01:00 (CET)
  - Summer (DST): UTC+02:00 (CEST)
- Postal codes: 24392
- Dialling codes: 04641
- Vehicle registration: SL
- Website: www.suederbrarup.de

Wagersrott (Danish: Vogsrød) is a municipality in the district of Schleswig-Flensburg, in Schleswig-Holstein, Germany.
