= Rügge =

Rügge Rygge
- Municipality
- Coat of arms

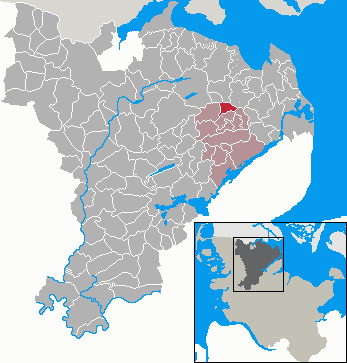
- Location of Rügge; Rygge within Schleswig-Flensburg district
- Interactive map of Rügge; Rygge
- Location within Germany Location within Schleswig-Holstein
- Coordinates: 54°40′N 9°46′E
- Country: Germany
- State: Schleswig-Holstein
- District: Schleswig-Flensburg
- Municipal assoc.: Süderbrarup

Government
  - Mayor: Hans Nikolaus Vogt

Area
  - Total: 6.02 km^{2} (2.32 sq mi)
- Elevation: 59 m (194 ft)

Population (2025-12-31)
  - Total: 236
  - Density: 39.2/km^{2} (102/sq mi)
- Time zone: UTC+01:00 (CET)
  - Summer (DST): UTC+02:00 (CEST)
- Postal codes: 24405
- Dialling codes: 04646
- Vehicle registration: SL
- Website: www.suederbrarup.de

Rügge (Danish: Rygge) is a municipality in the district of Schleswig-Flensburg, in Schleswig-Holstein, Germany.
