= Nottfeld =

- Municipality
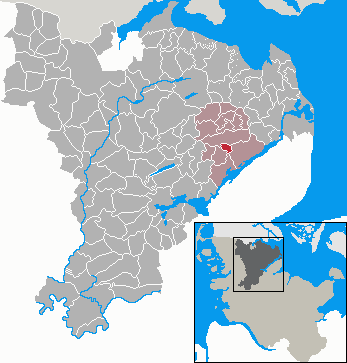
- Location of Nottfeld within Schleswig-Flensburg district
- Interactive map of Nottfeld
- Location within Germany Location within Schleswig-Holstein
- Coordinates: 54°37′N 9°46′E
- Country: Germany
- State: Schleswig-Holstein
- District: Schleswig-Flensburg
- Municipal assoc.: Süderbrarup

Government
  - Mayor: Jürgen Jessen-Schütt

Area
  - Total: 3.18 km^{2} (1.23 sq mi)
- Elevation: 19 m (62 ft)

Population (2025-12-31)
  - Total: 124
  - Density: 39.0/km^{2} (101/sq mi)
- Time zone: UTC+01:00 (CET)
  - Summer (DST): UTC+02:00 (CEST)
- Postal codes: 24392
- Dialling codes: 04641
- Vehicle registration: SL
- Website: www.suederbrarup.de

Nottfeld (Danish: Notfeld) is a municipality in the district of Schleswig-Flensburg, in Schleswig-Holstein, Germany.
