= Saustrup =

Saustrup Savstrup
- Municipality
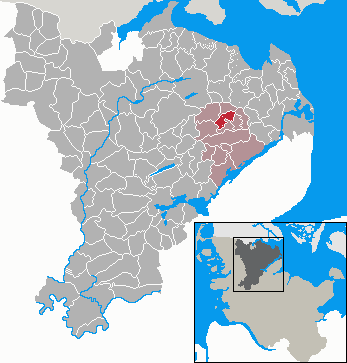
- Location of Saustrup; Savstrup within Schleswig-Flensburg district
- Interactive map of Saustrup; Savstrup
- Location within Germany Location within Schleswig-Holstein
- Coordinates: 54°40′N 9°46′E
- Country: Germany
- State: Schleswig-Holstein
- District: Schleswig-Flensburg
- Municipal assoc.: Süderbrarup

Government
  - Mayor: Heike Witt

Area
  - Total: 8.14 km^{2} (3.14 sq mi)
- Elevation: 37 m (121 ft)

Population (2025-12-31)
  - Total: 183
  - Density: 22.5/km^{2} (58.2/sq mi)
- Time zone: UTC+01:00 (CET)
  - Summer (DST): UTC+02:00 (CEST)
- Postal codes: 24392
- Dialling codes: 04641
- Vehicle registration: SL
- Website: www.suederbrarup.de

Saustrup (Danish: Savstrup) is a municipality in the district of Schleswig-Flensburg, in Schleswig-Holstein, Germany.
