= Roman Iron Age weapon deposits =

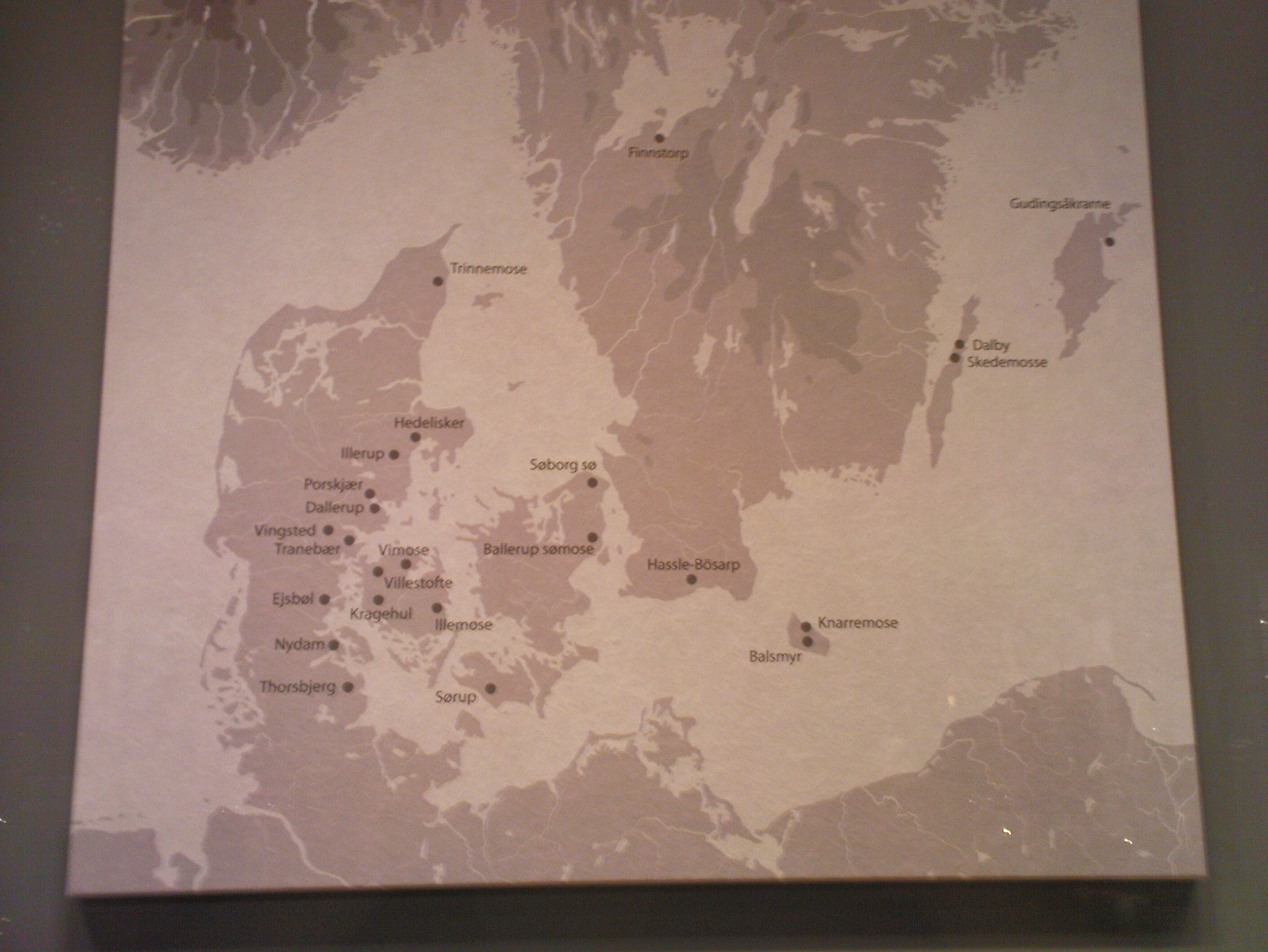
Iron Age votive offering sites in Scandinavia (Moesgaard Museum)

Roman Iron Age weapon deposits are intentional burials of large quantities of weapons from the Roman Iron Age of Scandinavia. The weapon deposits were intended for either sacrifice or burial and forms part of other Iron Age votive offerings from the period of bog deposits in Scandinavia. Almost all Scandinavian Iron Age bog deposits have been found in Denmark and southern Sweden, including Gotland.

== Illerup deposit ==
The archaeology of a former lake at the Jutland site of Illerup Ådal is the best evidence for what are taken to be the sacrifice and destruction of the weapons and equipment captured from enemy soldiers (at Illerup, soldiers rather than tribesmen because a certain uniformity of equipment suggests professional organisation). The anoxic conditions of the mud or peat at the bottom of the lakes or bogs preserved many of such sacrificed artifacts in good, or excellent condition.

Among the offerings at Illerup are also items belonging to the personal equipment of members of the defeated army. Combs made from reindeer and moose bones together with the finds of Roman coins could indicate that the army originated from northern Scandinavia and was on its way home from plunder or auxiliary service in the Roman Empire when it met its fate at Illerup.

Bogs are known to preserve bog bodies and bog butter but no human bodies are known to accompany the weapon sacrifices. The main Illerup deposition, besides weapons, includes gold, silver, spear shafts, shield boards, ropes, cords, leather, textiles tools, wooden vessels, spoons, beads, four horses and a cow. Dendrochronology of the shield boards shows that the deposition was soon after 205 AD, yet the last coin was minted in 187/8 AD. The shield bosses are taken, in the book, to represent three levels of hierarchy in the small army. The ordinary soldiers were represented by 350 iron bosses. The next level up had 30 bronze bosses and six bronze or iron bosses with gilded pressed foil. Above these, there were 5–6 silver shield bosses. Some Illerup objects have runes similar to those on the Vimose inscriptions.

== Other sites ==
A good number of deposit sites were in use for many centuries, with remains from several different sacrificial events, and they often includes many other types of offerings, such as animals, humans, boats, jewellery and food. The weapon sacrifices from the Roman Iron Age times usually dates from the period 200–500 AD, but earlier ones from the pre-Roman Iron Age are also known, such as the Hjortspring boat offering form around 350 BC, where more than 50 shields, 11 single-edged swords and 169 spearheads accompanied the boat.

The weapons were often burnt, broken or bent before deposition. The surviving boats were sunk in the lakes though other boats are known simply from clumps of burnt rivets. The Illerup deposit is known to have had at least three sacrificial events in the period around 200-500 AD. The bogs and lakes used appear to be surrounded by cultivated fields.

Roman Iron Age weapon deposits in Scandinavia allow for some changes in Germanic warfare to be monitored, e.g. the change from single edged swords at Hjortspring to double edged swords at Illerup. From grave finds of arrow heads, bows were significant war weapons in the Germanic area from about 200 AD. South of Denmark these are typically leaf shaped. In Denmark they are thinner and designed to penetrate the rings of mail armour. This change of weaponry is assumed to account for the Illerup shields having a layer of gut stretched over the surface. Besides keeping the shields dry, experiments show the shields much more resistant to splitting and penetration by arrows.

The rarest find from these sacrifices is a complete coat of mail armor. Reconstruction shows it to have had 20–23,000 rings and weighed just under 10 kg.

Perhaps even more interesting are the scabbards. A number have been recovered. Two of the more decorative from Nydam, one from the third century and one from the fifth had fur lining on the inside. We can reasonably speculate that this fur was oily and designed to keep the blade absolutely free from rust. The further speculation is that a pristine appearance of the blade would only have been so highly valued for pattern-welded blades. Classic sites includes Illerup Ådal and Kragehul.

== Sources ==
- Jørgensen, Lars; Storgaard, B.; Thomsen, L. G., eds. (2003). The Spoils of Victory: the North in the Shadow of the Roman Empire. Copenhagen: Nationalmuseet. ISBN 87-7602-006-1.
- ed. Linda Boye (2011): The Iron Age on Zealand - Status and Perspectives, The Royal Society of Northern Antiquaries
