= Loit =

Loit Løjt
- Municipality
- Coat of arms

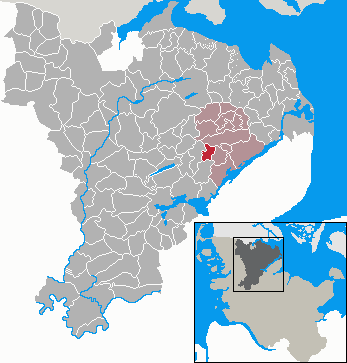
- Location of Loit; Løjt within Schleswig-Flensburg district
- Interactive map of Loit; Løjt
- Location within Germany Location within Schleswig-Holstein
- Coordinates: 54°37′N 9°41′E
- Country: Germany
- State: Schleswig-Holstein
- District: Schleswig-Flensburg
- Municipal assoc.: Süderbrarup

Government
  - Mayor: Johann Peter Christiansen

Area
  - Total: 6.69 km^{2} (2.58 sq mi)
- Elevation: 19 m (62 ft)

Population (2025-12-31)
  - Total: 259
  - Density: 38.7/km^{2} (100/sq mi)
- Time zone: UTC+01:00 (CET)
  - Summer (DST): UTC+02:00 (CEST)
- Postal codes: 24888
- Dialling codes: 04641
- Vehicle registration: SL
- Website: www.suederbrarup.de

Loit (Danish: Løjt) is a municipality in the district of Schleswig-Flensburg, in Schleswig-Holstein, Germany.
