= Ulsnis =

Ulsnis Ulsnæs
- Municipality
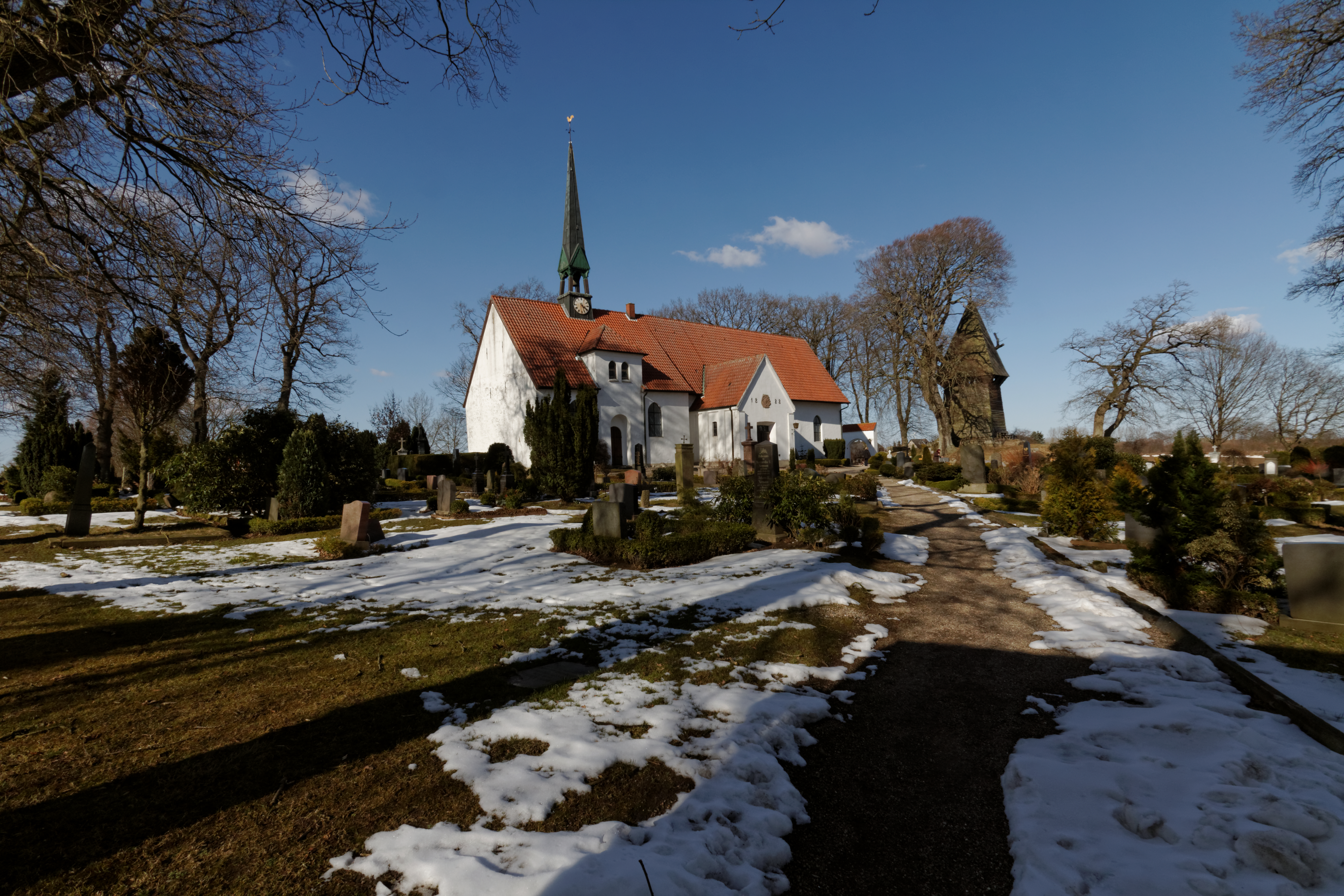

- Coat of arms

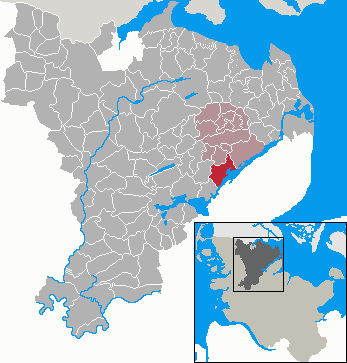
- Location of Ulsnis; Ulsnæs within Schleswig-Flensburg district
- Interactive map of Ulsnis; Ulsnæs
- Location within Germany Location within Schleswig-Holstein
- Coordinates: 54°34′N 9°45′E
- Country: Germany
- State: Schleswig-Holstein
- District: Schleswig-Flensburg
- Municipal assoc.: Süderbrarup

Government
  - Mayor: Heidrun Karaca

Area
  - Total: 19.81 km^{2} (7.65 sq mi)
- Elevation: 5 m (16 ft)

Population (2025-12-31)
  - Total: 715
  - Density: 36.1/km^{2} (93.5/sq mi)
- Time zone: UTC+01:00 (CET)
  - Summer (DST): UTC+02:00 (CEST)
- Postal codes: 24897
- Dialling codes: 04641
- Vehicle registration: SL
- Website: www.ulsnis.de

Ulsnis (Danish: Ulsnæs) is a municipality in the district of Schleswig-Flensburg, in Schleswig-Holstein, Germany.
