= Nydam Mose =

Archaeological site at Øster Sottrup, Denmark

Coordinates: 54°57′10″N 9°43′23″E

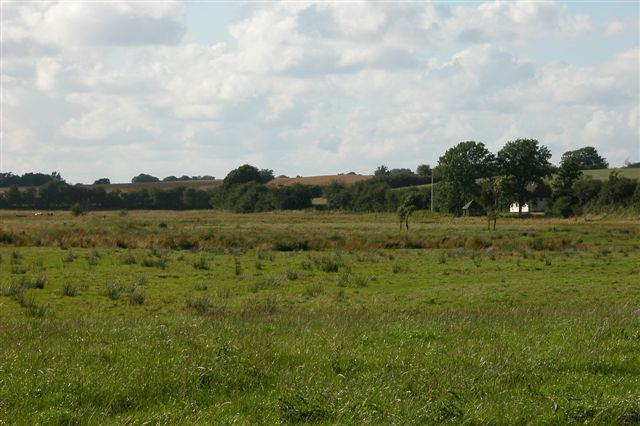
A modern-day view of what was once the Nydam Bog

The Nydam Mose, also known as Nydam Bog, is an archaeological site in Denmark located at Øster Sottrup, a town in Sundeved, eight kilometres (5 mi) from Sønderborg.

== History ==
In the Iron Age, the site of the bog was a sacred place, where the weapons and ships of vanquished armies were offered to the indigenous gods in thanks for victory over the fallen enemy. Many items were deliberately destroyed (bent, broken or hacked into pieces) in ritual sacrificial acts, from the period 200–400 CE.

The first known finds from the bog date from the 1830s, when a local farmer gave old swords and shields as toys to his children.

Amongst numerous other items, three boats were found in Nydam Bog. In particular, the 23 m (75 ft) long oak boat, commonly known as "the Nydam Boat", maintains a distinguished position amongst Danish Iron Age finds, as it is one of the oldest known rowing vessel in Northern Europe (the Hjortspring boat, also found in Denmark, is even older). The oak boat (egetræsbåden) is on display at the archaeological museum in Gottorf Castle, Schleswig, Germany.

== Excavation ==
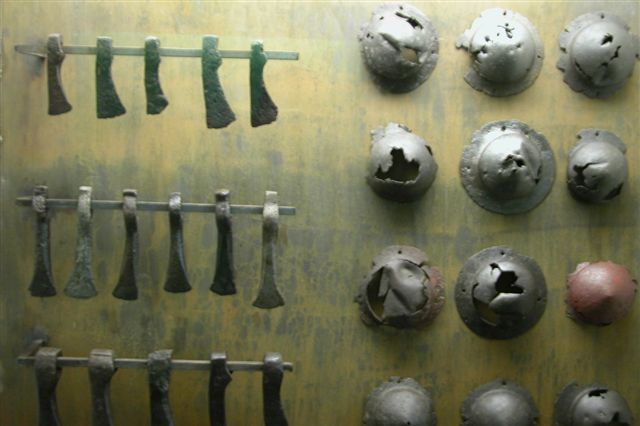
Objects discovered in Nydam Bog on display at Gottorf Castle

=== First excavation ===
From 1859 to 1863, archaeologist Conrad Engelhardt excavated the bog. Engelhardt found weapons, tools, pieces of clothing and two intact clinker built boats, one made of oak and one made of pine. The weapons include lances, spears, bows, arrows and round shields. Under these finds were the remains of a third boat, which apparently had been demolished already during the sacrifice.

Engelhardt's work ceased with the outbreak of the Second Schleswig War in early 1864. Some of the discoveries from the bog were lost during the Second Schleswig War. The smaller of the two boats, perhaps 19 meters long and made of pine, was hacked up and used as firewood by troops.

=== Second excavation ===
The National Museum of Denmark resumed excavation of the bog in 1989. During excavation a large quantity of weapons have come to light, in the form of swords, spears, bows and arrows; and also personal effects such as belt buckles, brooches and ornate clasps. These finds originate from the Iron Age, in the period between 250–550 CE.

== Nydam boat ==
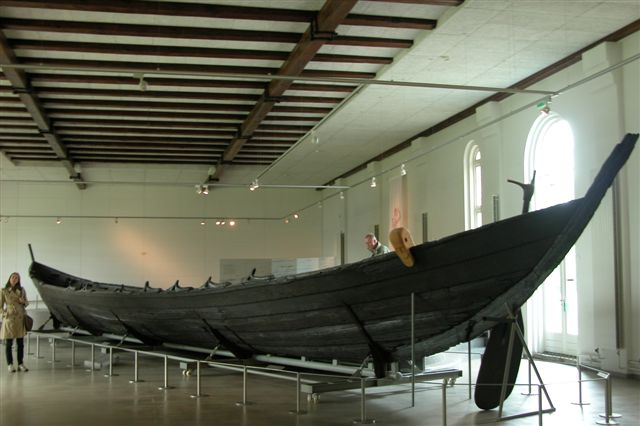
The Nydam oak boat on display at Gottorf Castle, Schleswig, Germany

The Nydam Mose sacrifice site was probably used on different occasions during the years 200–450 CE. Conrad Engelhardt on August 17, 1863, discovered the Nydam Boat. The oak boat was the first and largest of the three boats that were found in the Nydam bog, and the only one still preserved (the pine boat was entirely destroyed during the Second Schleswig War). It has been dendro dated to 310–320 CE. It is 23 m (75 ft) long, c. 3.5 m (11 ft) wide, of clinker type, weighed over three tonnes, had 14 pairs of oars and likely had a crew of around 45 men. After losing the war and part of the country, Denmark was forced to transfer the Nydam Boat to Prussia and today it is displayed at Gottorf Castle in Schleswig, Germany.

== Nydam Society ==
Interest in the archaeology of Nydam Bog has always been particularly lively in the local area. The Nydam discoveries were and remain a significant theme in the relationship between Danish and German cultures in the border region. On this basis, the "Society for Nydam Research" – commonly known as the Nydam Society - was formed in 1983. Through its work, this interest group has contributed to the resumption of National Museum of Denmark's investigation of the bog.

Today, the site is a green meadow. Parking is available on Nydamvej. From here, there is a path (Nydamstien) to the small white house, Nydamhuset, which is situated beside the site of the archaeological discoveries. It takes about 10 minutes to walk there.

The Nydam Society's long-standing desire to build a replica of the Nydam Boat has been realized. The Nydam Tveir was built employing the techniques of the time – both to exploit the material characteristics of the timber and to develop an understanding of how large vessels were built in that period. Construction of a replica of the Nydam Boat was based on the oak boat found in 1859. The construction of the Nydam Boat was divided into two phases. Phase 1 was a feasibility study to investigate the construction of the boat. Here the builders investigated prerequisites and gathered experience for use in Phase 2, which comprised building the complete boat.

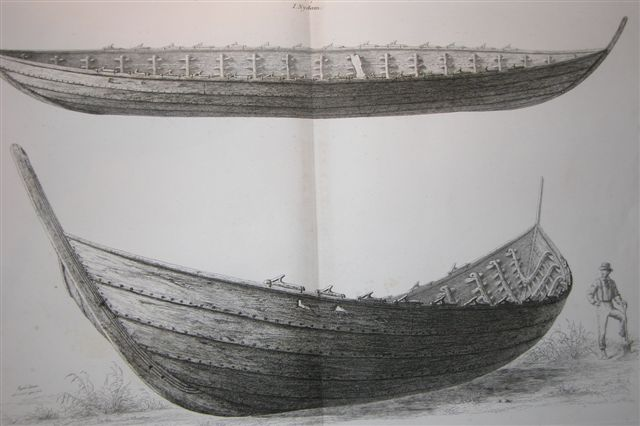
Engelhardt's pictures

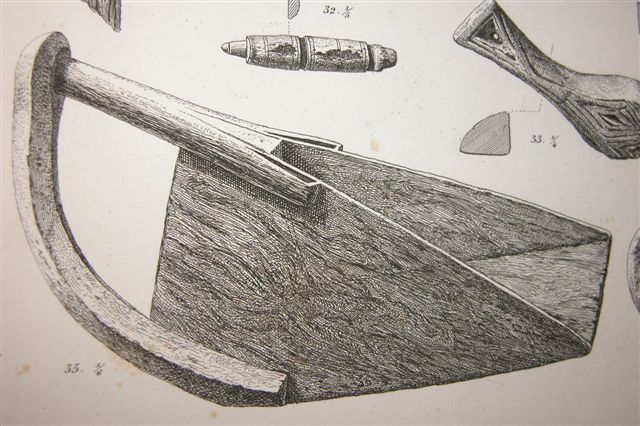
From the pine boat

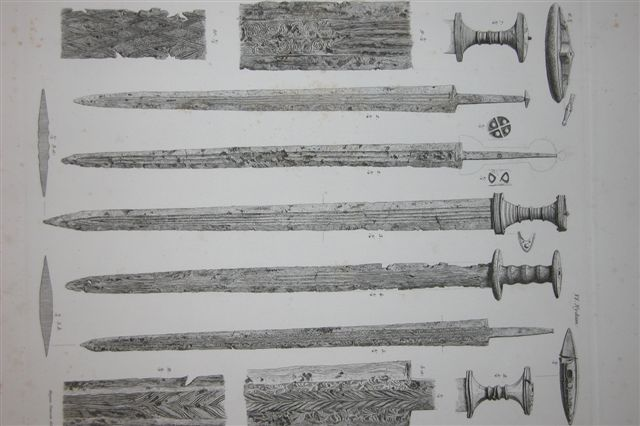
Swords

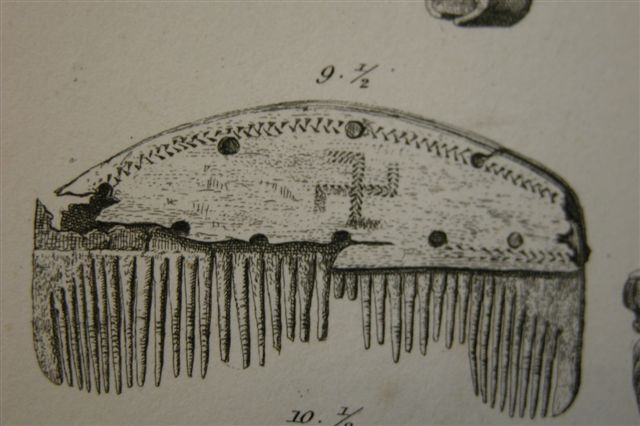
A 3rd or 4th century comb with a Swastika found in the bog

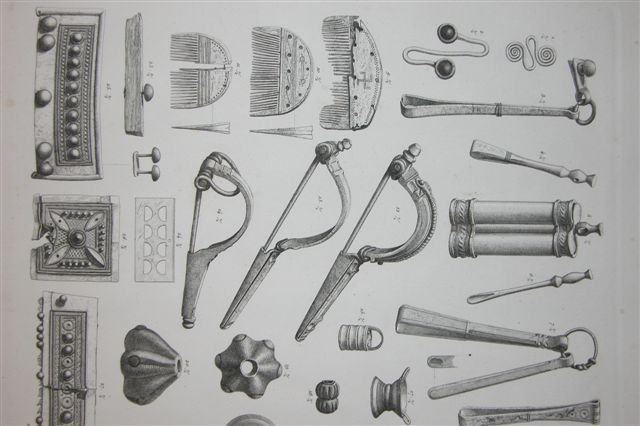
Various finds

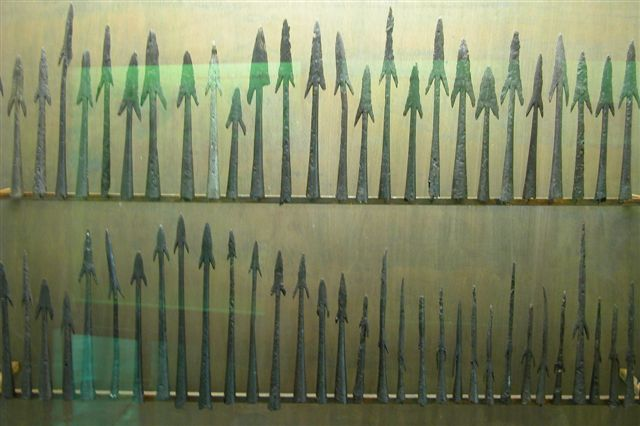
Spears

== Panorama ==
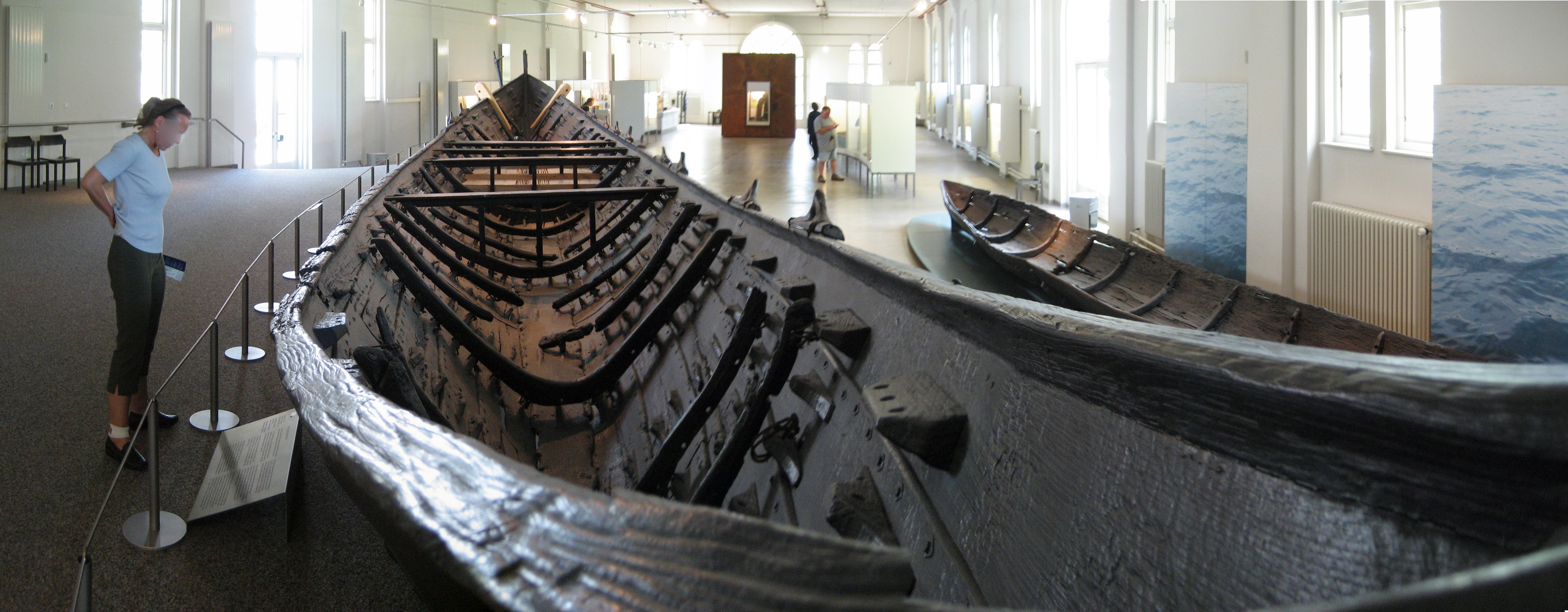
Inner view of oak made Nydam-boat. Frames are adjusted to planks by spacers and fixed by ropes.

== See also ==
- Alu (runic)
- Weapons sacrifice
- Ship burial
- List of surviving ancient ships
