= Theodor Ohlsen =

German painter (1855–1913)

Theodor Ohlsen (1855 in Klein-Brebel – 1913 in Wiesbaden) was a German landscape, marine and portrait painter.

== Life ==
Ohlsen, son of a tailor, studied in Hamburg, Munich and Berlin, where he was a student of Gyula Benczúr, Ludwig von Löfftz, Karl Gussow and Franz von Defregger. On 20 October 1880, he entered the Academy of Fine Arts, Munich. He was a member of the Hamburg Artists' Association.

From 1883 to 1893 he travelled to several continents, with Chile being a particular fascination for him. He captured the country, its people and its way of life in many travel pictures, some of which are also of cultural and historical significance. After his return to Hamburg in 1895 he exhibited two large-format marine paintings at the Hamburg Great Art Exhibition and at the Saxon Art Association. He later worked in Wiesbaden, where he died in 1913.
