= Scheggerott =

Scheggerott Skæggerød
- Municipality
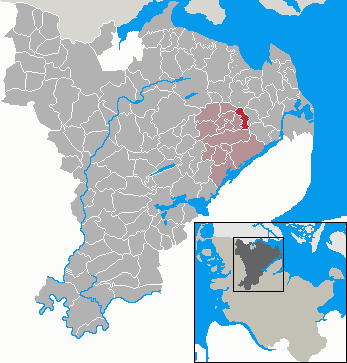
- Location of Scheggerott; Skæggerød within Schleswig-Flensburg district
- Interactive map of Scheggerott; Skæggerød
- Location within Germany Location within Schleswig-Holstein
- Coordinates: 54°40′19″N 9°49′23″E
- Country: Germany
- State: Schleswig-Holstein
- District: Schleswig-Flensburg
- Municipal assoc.: Süderbrarup

Government
  - Mayor: Hartwig Callsen (CDU)

Area
  - Total: 6.32 km^{2} (2.44 sq mi)
- Elevation: 33 m (108 ft)

Population (2025-12-31)
  - Total: 327
  - Density: 51.7/km^{2} (134/sq mi)
- Time zone: UTC+01:00 (CET)
  - Summer (DST): UTC+02:00 (CEST)
- Postal codes: 24392
- Dialling codes: 04641
- Vehicle registration: SL
- Website: www.suederbrarup.de

Scheggerott (German pronunciation: [ˈʃɛɡəʁɔt]; Danish: Skæggerød) is a municipality in the district of Schleswig-Flensburg, in Schleswig-Holstein, Germany.
