= Hjortspring boat =

Large canoe type vessel dated to 350 found in Hjortspring Mose at Als, Denmark

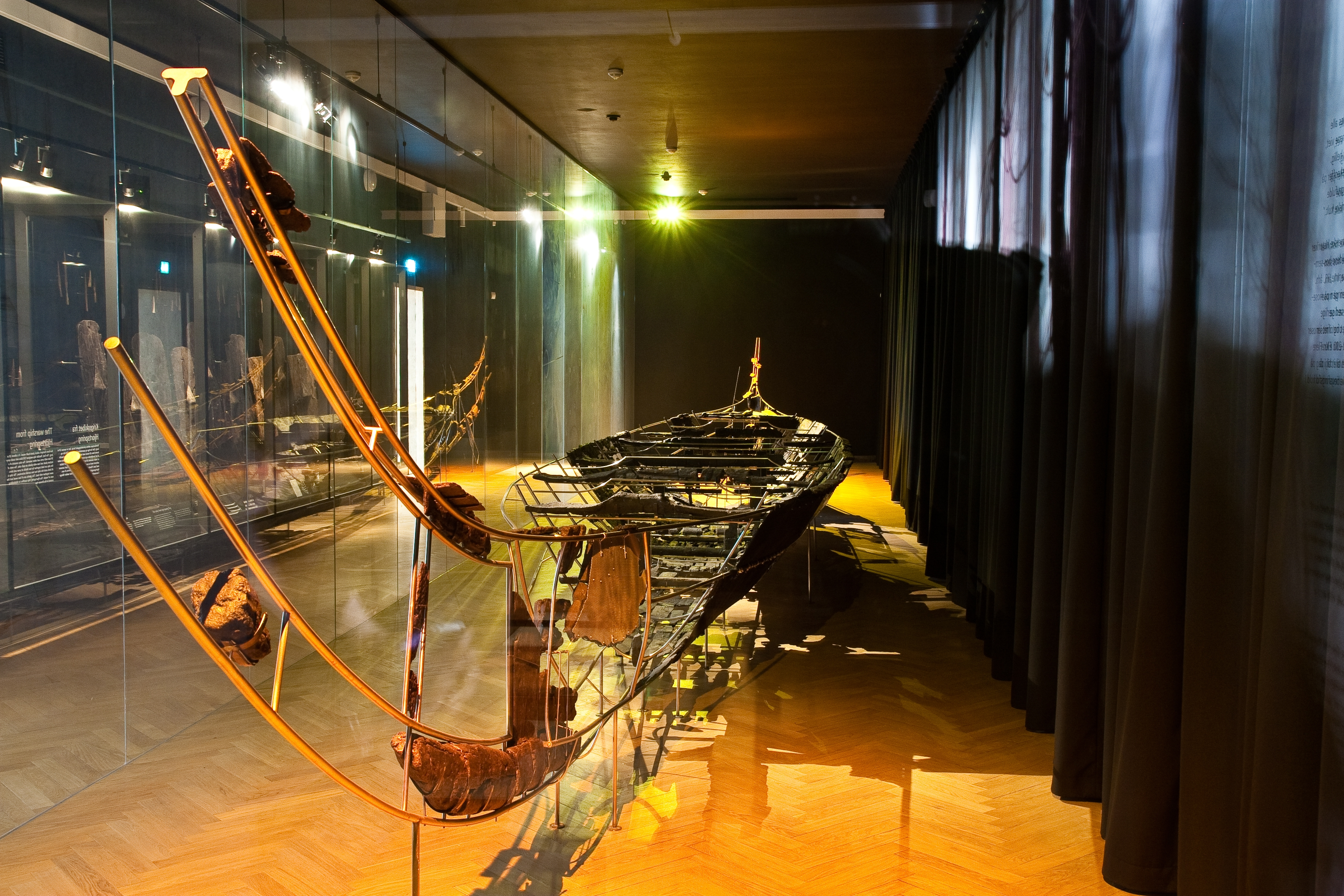
The reconstructed remains of the Hjortspring boat at the National Museum of Denmark in Copenhagen

The Hjortspring boat (Danish: Hjortspringbåden) is a vessel designed as a large canoe, from the Scandinavian Pre-Roman Iron Age. It was built circa 400–300 BC. The hull and remains were rediscovered and excavated in 1921–1922 from the bog of Hjortspring Mose on the island of Als in Sønderjylland, southern Denmark. The boat is the oldest find of a wooden plank ship in Scandinavia and it closely resembles the thousands of petroglyph images of Nordic Bronze Age ships found throughout Scandinavia. The vessel is a planked wooden boat of more than 19 metres (62 feet) length overall, 13.6 metres (45 feet) long inside, and 2 metres (6.6 feet) wide. The planking is joined by sewing, using a bevelled lap joint similar to clinker construction. Ten thwarts that could have served as seats, span the boat with room for two persons each; this suggests space for a crew of at least 20 who propelled the boat with paddles. The boat would have weighed an estimated 530 kilograms (1,170 pounds), making it easily portable by its crew.

== Associated finds ==
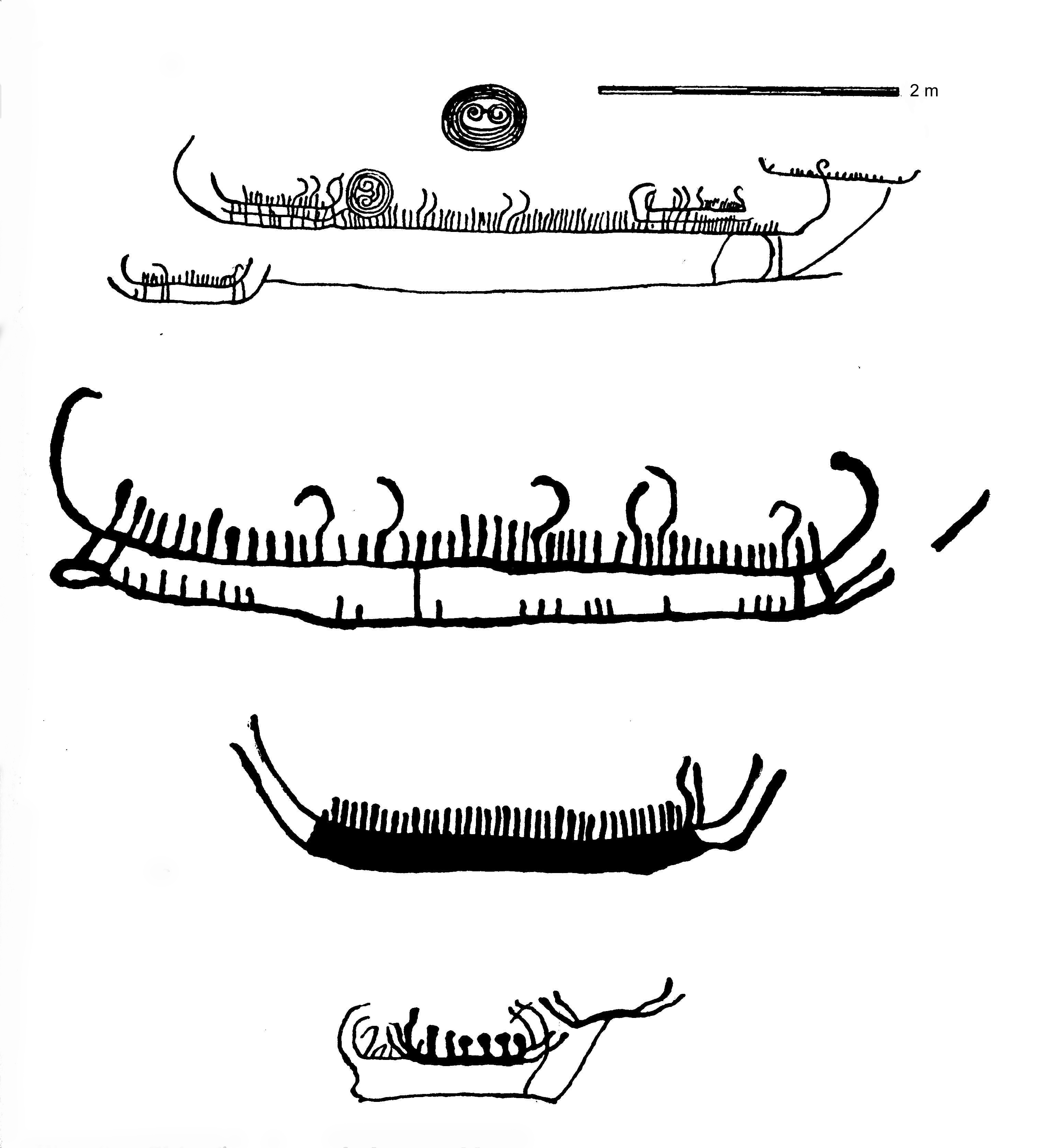
Petroglyphs of boats from the Nordic Bronze Age in Scandinavia

When found, the boat contained a great quantity of weapons and armour, including 131 shields of the Celtic type, 33 well-crafted shield bosses, 138 iron spearheads, 31 bone or antler spearheads, 11 single-edged iron swords, and the remains of several mailcoats. Two of the swords were deliberately bent, a practice associated with Iron Age rituals. The largest of the spearheads is a massive 43.5 centimetres (17.1 inches) long. The find also contained bowls, boxes, blacksmith's tools, and other everyday goods. The sinking of the vessel in the bog has been interpreted as a deliberate votive offering. This is reinforced by the presence of a dismembered horse placed beneath the boat at the time of burial along with a lamb, a calf, and two dogs. Numerous graves have been discovered in Denmark from this time period containing similar grave goods and sacrificed horses, dogs, lambs, cows, other animals, and human beings.

== Construction ==
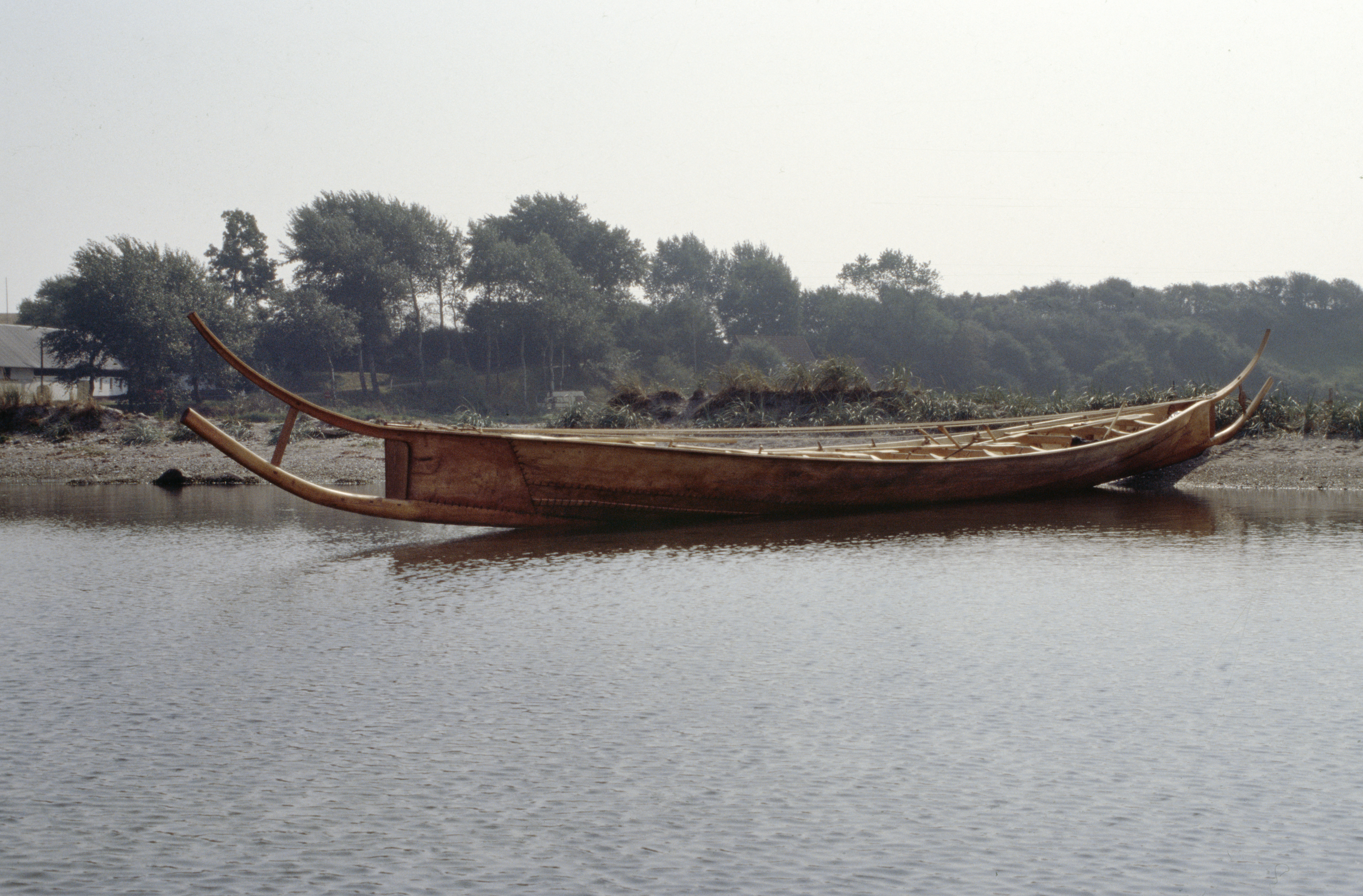
Reconstruction of the Hjortspring boat.

The Hjortspring boat was constructed of lime (linden) wood planks sewn together with cord of lime bark, spruce root, or rawhide. Pitch was used to caulk and coat the seams to make the boat watertight. A long dugout log forms the bottom plank, which also acts as the keel, with two additional planks, or strakes, attached on both sides to fashion the hull. This allows the large vessel to sit high in the water and to traverse shallow waters, even with a full crew and heavy load. Hollowed timbers were used to create the distinct stem and stern-posts. These stem pieces, along with the bottom plank, extend forward and backward from the hull to form the iconic "beaks" of this type of boat construction. Vertical oak struts, secured by wooden pegs and pitch, fasten the upper and lower "beaks" and brace both ends of the watercraft. Thin limbs of hazel form the ribs which were lashed to cleats in the planks. These cleats were made by carving down the rest of the plank boards; this created a strong attachment point without a need for fastening each cleat separately by lashing or pegs to the long planks of the hull. The hull planks and hazel ribs are supported by thwarts and thicker supporting ribs of ash.

The high level of craftsmanship present in the archaeological find indicates that the boatbuilding methods used to construct the Hjortpsring boat are significantly older than the boat itself.

Hjortspring boat
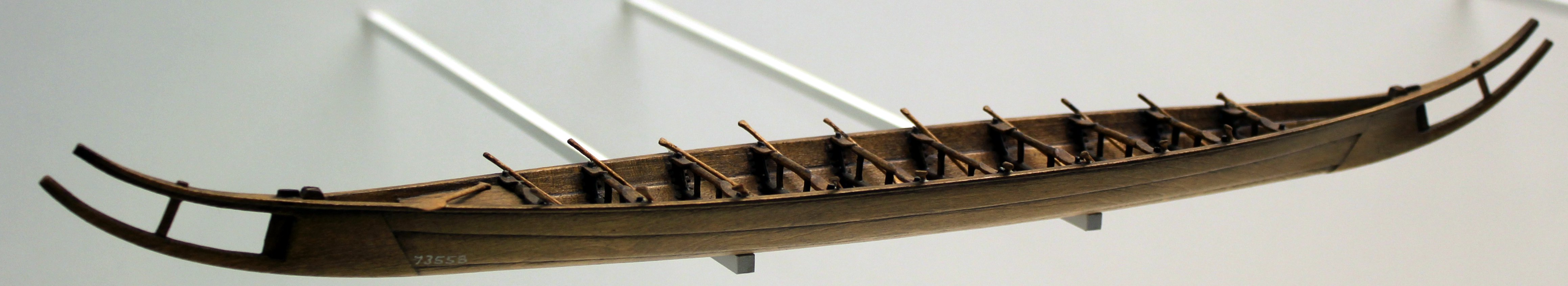
Model

Sketch with correct scaling and angles.

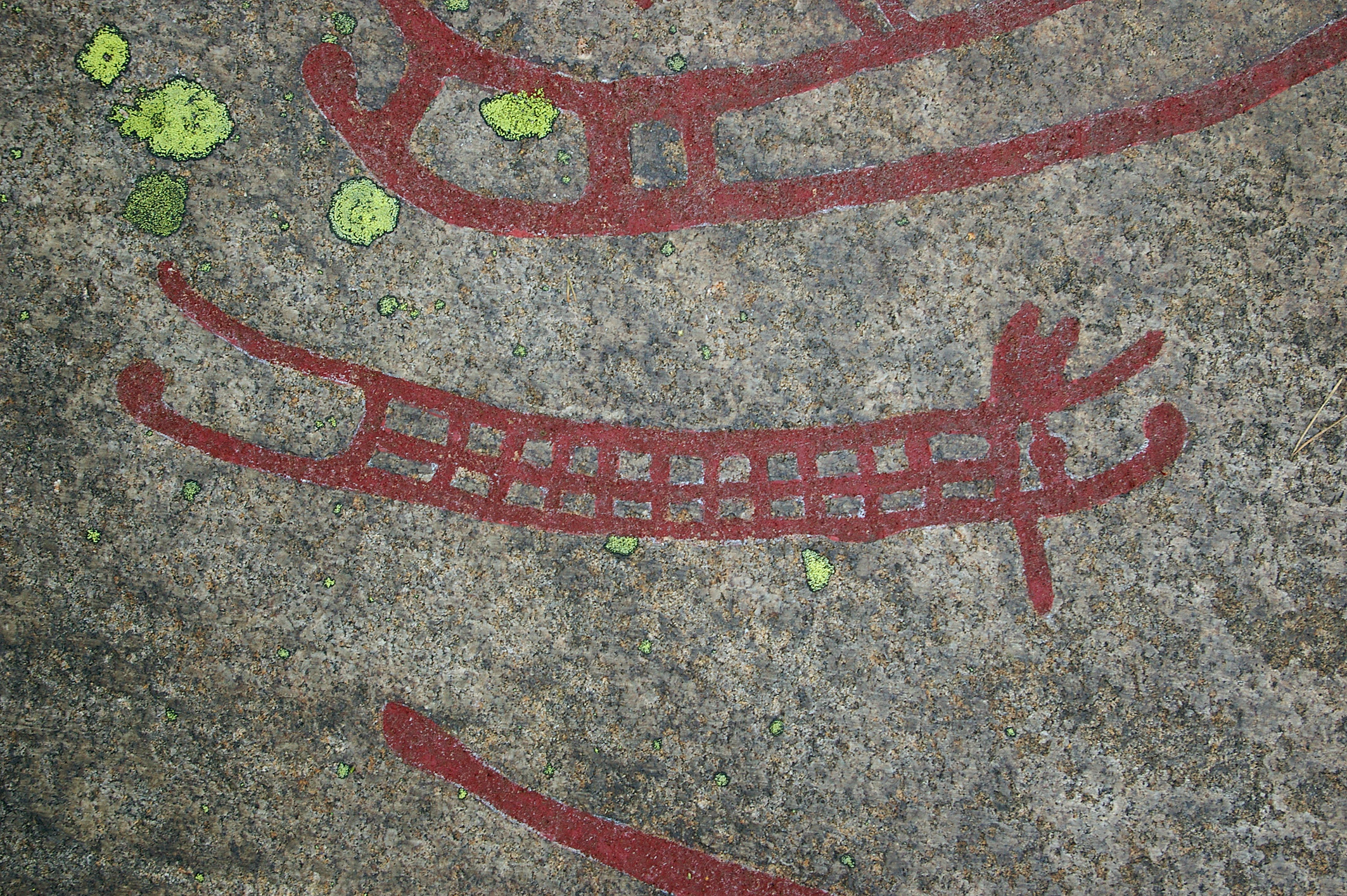
Rock carvings of boats.

== Later history of this type ==
Watercraft of this style and construction were built and used at least until the 3rd century AD. Metal rivets become increasingly present in later finds and the stem construction was simplified to a single curved shape which extended and tapered outward from the hull. These later stems, or prows, were made of single pieces of wood or multiple pieces joined. Much of the essential boatbuilding methods found in the Hjortspring boat persisted into the Viking Age. This continuation can be seen in the boat finds from Halsnøy (200 AD), Nydam (300-400 AD), Sutton Hoo (600-700 AD), and Kvalsund (690 AD).

== Modern Reconstruction- The Tilia Alsie ==
A full reconstruction of the Hjortspring Boat was launched in 1999.

== See also ==
- Iron Age Scandinavia
- List of surviving ancient ships
- Dugout canoe
- Sewn boat
- Lashed-lug boat
- Clinker (boat building)
- Nydam Mose
- Ship burial
- Bog body
- Death in Norse paganism
- National Museum of Denmark
