= Illerup Ådal =

Valley in Skanderborg Municipality, Denmark

Coordinates: 56.0531°N 9.93248°E

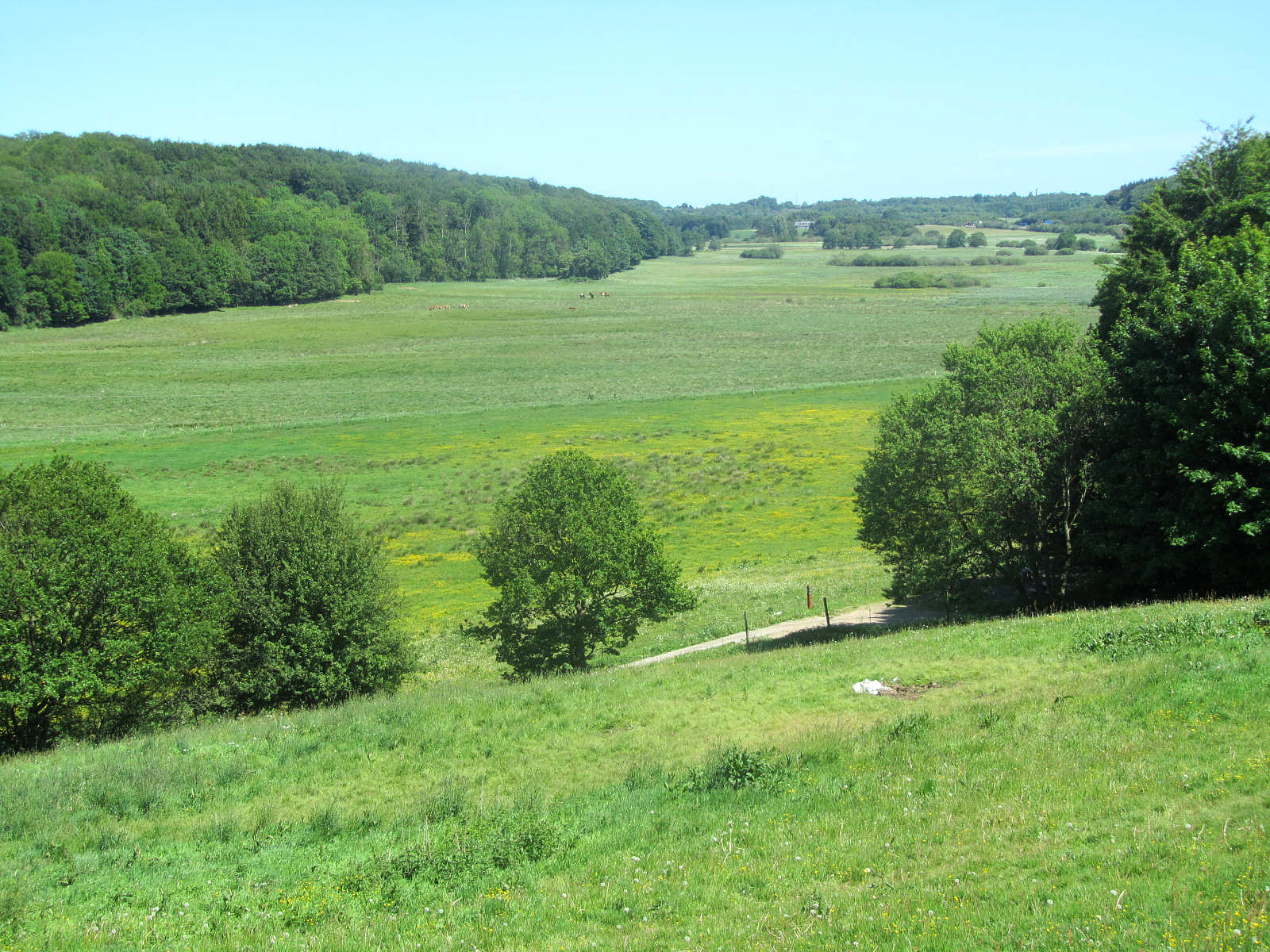
- View across Illerup Ådal

- Location within Denmark
- Periods: Iron Age
- Location: Skanderborg, Denmark

Site notes
- Excavation dates: 1950-1956; 1975-1985

Illerup Ådal (English: Illerup River-valley) is a river valley and archeological site located near Skanderborg in East Jutland, Denmark.

== Archaeological discoveries ==
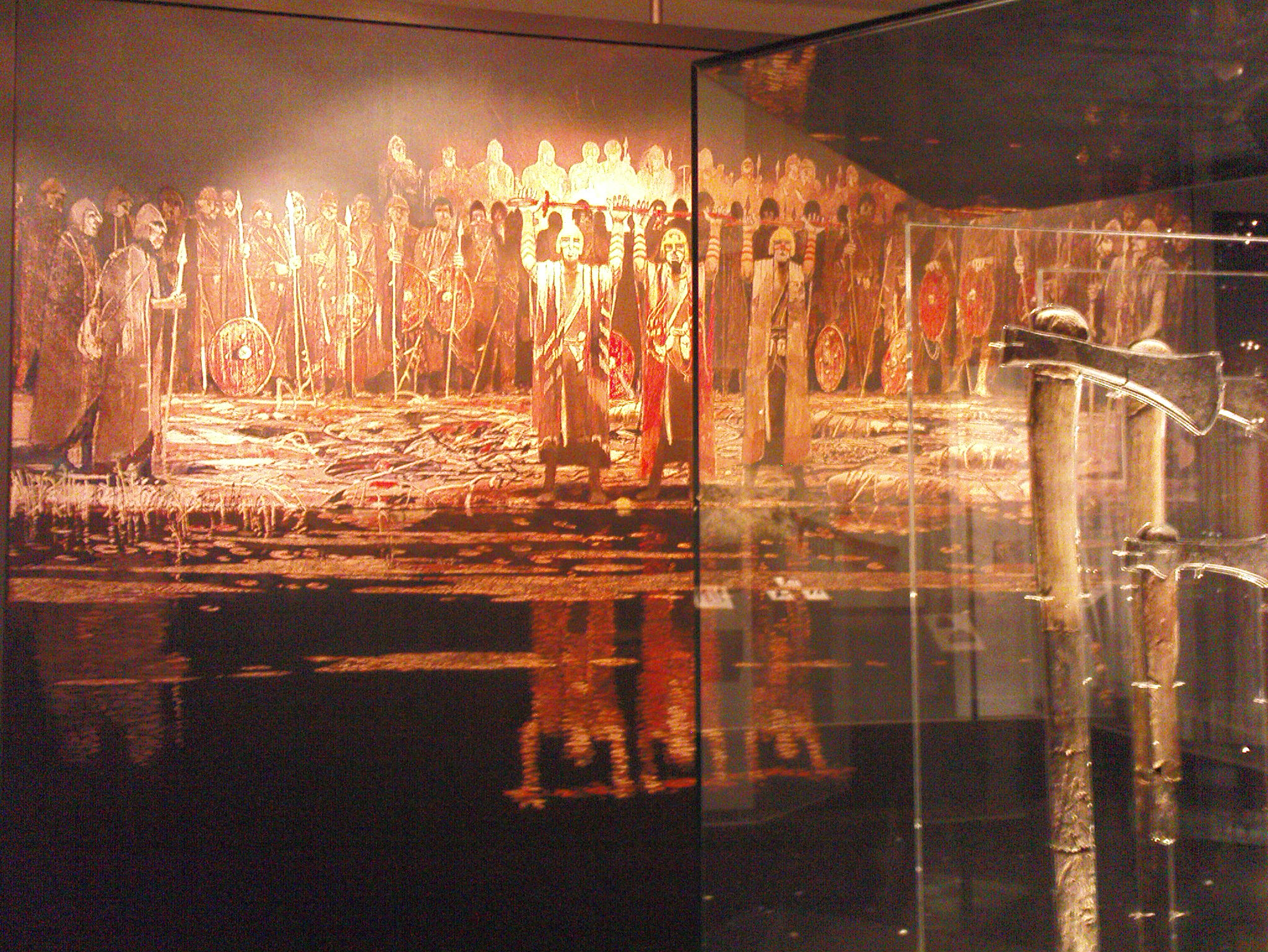
An artists view of a votive offering taking place in Illerup Ådal. Some of the excavated weapons (axes) can be glimpsed in the exhibition case on the right. From a former exhibition at Moesgård Museum.

According to Forte, Oram, and Pedersen, "The Illerup Ådal site is one of twenty-five in Denmark and southern Sweden where weapons were sacrificed." The sites include eastern Jylland, Fyn, Lolland, Sjaelland, and Bornholm in Denmark, plus Öland and Västergötland in Sweden. The oldest deposit in Illerup Ådal contained 300 spear points, two with the name Wagnijo written in runes, plus shields, belts, and scabbards. In addition, about 129 tinderboxes, and 124 combs were unearthed.

The first archaeological findings at the river valley of Illerup Ådal were revealed in 1950, during some drainage work. The area was subsequently excavated from 1950 till 1956 and again from 1975 to 1985. During the excavations more than 15,000 items, mainly Iron Age weapons and personal equipment from 200 to 500 AD, were found. It is generally agreed that the findings are enemy equipment captured after victories, and then thrown into the lake, as a votive offering to the gods. Illerup Ådal is one of twenty-five sites in Denmark and Southern Sweden where sacrificed weapons have been found.

Archeological excavations also produced some findings bearing the Elder Futhark runic inscriptions from the earliest period.

To ensure preservation of the area, which still holds many findings, the location was granted protected status in 1996.

=== Alken Enge ===
The wet meadows of Alken Enge (Alken Meadows), forms the lower part of the short river valley of Illerup Ådal. The Alken Enge wetlands are located near Lake Mossø at Skanderborg and they are the site of a recent massive archaeological excavation.

The skeletal remains of hundreds of Iron Age warriors were found in 2008 and 2009, during a large scale archaeological excavation carried out as project work by students of Aarhus University in what was likely a lake bed when the remains were placed there about 2,000 years ago. The area covers 40 ha and although the events behind the macabre scene are unclear at the moment, many of the dead are believed to be warriors, maybe sacrificed prisoners of the wars at the time. The finds in Alken Enge predates the former Illerup Ådal find, but are also from the Nordic Iron Age.

Excavation Project Manager Mads Kähler Holst, professor of archaeology at Aarhus University, has been quoted as saying of finding the remains of a violent conflict at the 40-hectare (99-acre) site: "It's clear that this must have been a quite far-reaching and dramatic event, that must have had profound effect on the society of the time. The dig has produced a large quantity of skeletal remains, and we believe that they will give us the answers to some of our questions about what kind of events led up to the army ending up here."

== See also ==
- Roman Iron Age weapon deposits

== Sources ==
- "Macabre finds in the bog at Alken Enge, Denmark: Skeletal remains of hundreds of warriors unearthed". ScienceDaily.
- Petersen, Irene Berg (22 August 2012). "An entire army sacrificed in a bog". www.sciencenordic.com.
- Milligan, Mark (9 July 2012). "An entire army, sacrificed in a bog". HeritageDaily - Archaeology News.
- "Hundreds Of Ancient Warriors' Remains Found In Bog". HuffPost. 14 August 2012.
