= Traditional games of Iran =

Iran has some traditional games, sports, and martial arts that date back thousands of years. Many of these games have started to disappear due to urbanisation, the advent of computer games, and the neglect of cultural institutions.

== History ==
Some of the traditional Iranian games were demonstrated at the 1974 Asian Games hosted by Iran as a way of demonstrating the ability for traditional Persian culture to coexist with modern Western culture.

== Traditional games ==
=== Zu (Compares with Kabaddi, of Indian origin) ===
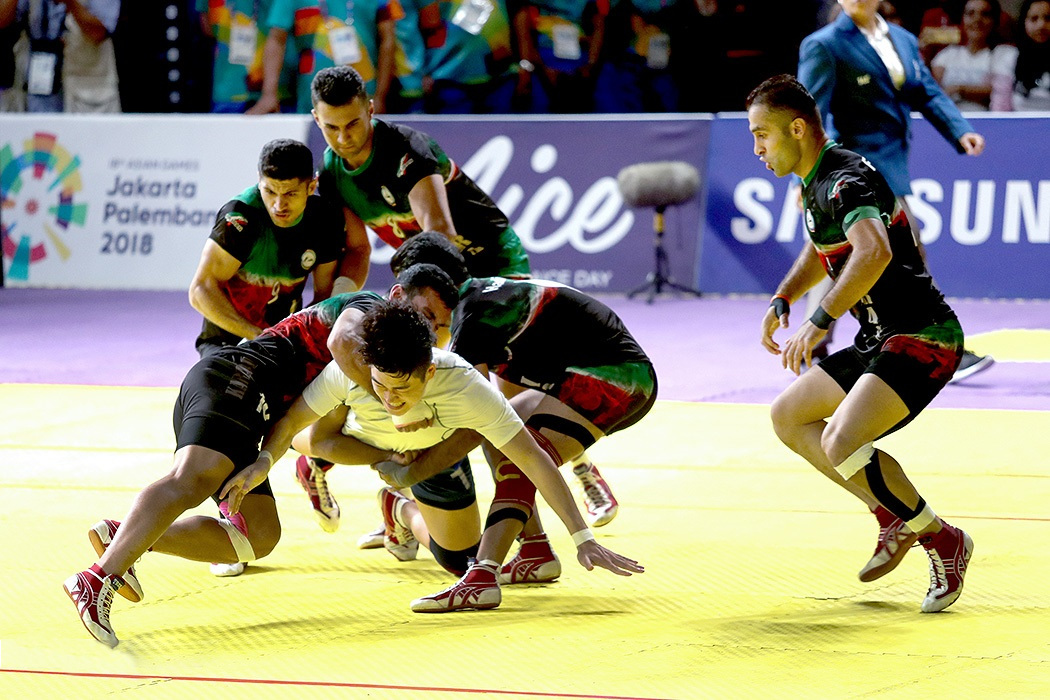
Kabaddi being played at the 2018 Asian Games

Kabaddi (/kəˈbædi/, /ˈkʌbədi/) is a contact team sport played between two teams of seven players. It is one of the traditional games of South Asia. In the game, a raider enters the opposing half of the court to tag the defenders and attempt to return within 30 seconds without being tackled. Points are awarded for successful tags, while defenders earn a point for tackling the raider. Tagged or tackled players are temporarily out but can re-enter when their team scores. Raids alternate between teams throughout the game.

Zu/Zou is similar to the better-known version of the game Kabaddi of India, and has a history going back thousands of years in the country. In this version, the attacker starts with hawling "zou" (see above reference) the entire time performing the mission without breathing until gets back to the base. Another contrast is there is no 30 second rule in Zu.

=== Haft sang ===
Seven stones (also known by various other names) is a traditional game from the Indian subcontinent involving a ball and a pile of flat stones, generally played between two teams in a large outdoor area.

=== Choub bazi ===
Choub bazi, choob or choobazi (Persian: چوب بازی chub bāzi; Khorasani and Sistani: چو بازی chu bāzi; lit. "wood play") is one of Iranian games and traditions with an ancient history that goes back to ancient Iran. This traditional ritual is also mentioned in Ferdowsi's Shahnameh. In Iran, there are two authentic types of stick games. One is the Sistani stick game, which is popular in the eastern half of Iran. The other is the Lori, which is more popular in the southern and western parts of the country.

== Martial arts ==
=== Pahlavani ===
Pahlevani and zoorkhaneh rituals (Pahlavani Sport / Zoorkhaneh Sport) is the name inscribed by UNESCO for Varzesh-e pahlavāni (Persian: آیین پهلوانی و زورخانه‌ای 'heroic sport') or Varzesh-e bāstāni (ورزش باستانی 'ancient sport'), a traditional system of athletics and a form of martial arts originally used to train warriors in Iran (Persia). Outside Iran, zoorkhanehs can now also be found in Azerbaijan, and Afghanistan, and were introduced into Iraq in the mid-19th century by the Iranian immigrants, where they seem to have existed until the 1980s before disappearing. It combines martial arts, calisthenics, strength training and music. It contains elements of pre-Islamic and post-Islamic culture of Iran (particularly Zoroastrianism and Gnosticism) with the spirituality of Persian Shia Islam and Sufism. Practiced in a domed structure called the zurkhāneh, training sessions consist mainly of ritual gymnastic movements and climax with the core of combat practice, a style of folk wrestling called koshti pahlavāni.

== Board games ==
=== Shatranj ===
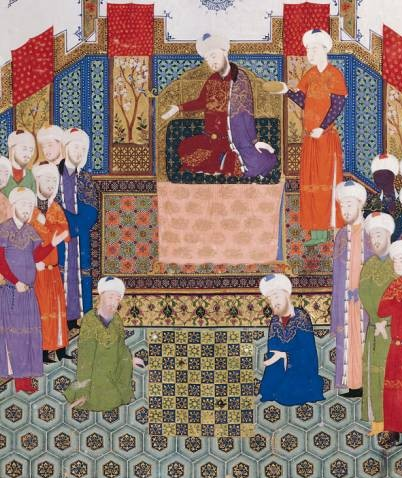
Two shatranj players in a detail from a Persian miniature painting of Bayasanghori Shahname made in 1430

Shatranj (Arabic: شطرنج, pronounced [ʃaˈtˤrandʒ]; from Middle Persian chatrang) is an old form of chess, as played in the Sasanian Empire. Its origins lie in the Indian game of chaturanga. Modern chess gradually developed from this game, as it was introduced to Europe by contacts in Muslim Al-Andalus (modern Spain) and in Sicily in the 10th century. In modern Persian, the term is also used as the translation of chess.

=== Nard ===
Nard (Persian: نرد, also narde or nardshir; from Middle Persian: nywʾlthšyl nēw-ardaxšīr) is a historical Persian tables game for two players that is sometimes considered ancestral to backgammon. It is still played today, albeit in a different form. As in other tables games, the playing pieces are moved around a board according to rolls of dice. It uses a standard tables board, but has a different opening layout and rules of play from that of backgammon.

== Card games ==
=== Baas-o-Beyt ===
Baas-o-Beyt (Sistanian: بئث و بئت) is a special kind of rhyming game common among Sistanian people and is generally considered as a genre of Sistanian poetry (called Seytak) played by composing verses of Sistanian poems, along with some Sistanian dance and music. It is very similar to Bait bazi, Antakshari and Crambo as well.

=== Pasur ===
Pasur or chahar barg (Persian: پاسور; also spelled Pasour or Pasur) is a fishing card game of Persian origin. Played widely in Iran, it is played similarly to the Italian games of Cassino or Scopa and even more similarly to the Egyptian game of Bastra. Pasur is also known by the names Chahâr Barg (4 cards), Haft Khâj (seven clubs) or Haft Va Chahâr, Yâzdah (7+4=11, the significance being that players want to win 7 clubs in a game of 4-card hands where 11 is a winning number).

=== Shelem ===
Shelem (Persian: شلم Shělěm), also called Rok or similar, is an Iranian trick-taking card game with four players in two partnerships, bidding and competing against each other. Bidding and trump are declared in every hand by the bidding winner. Both the name and the point structure of this game are similar to the American game Rook, there being a possible connection between the two games. Though it isn't clear from which game it is derived.

=== Ganjifa ===
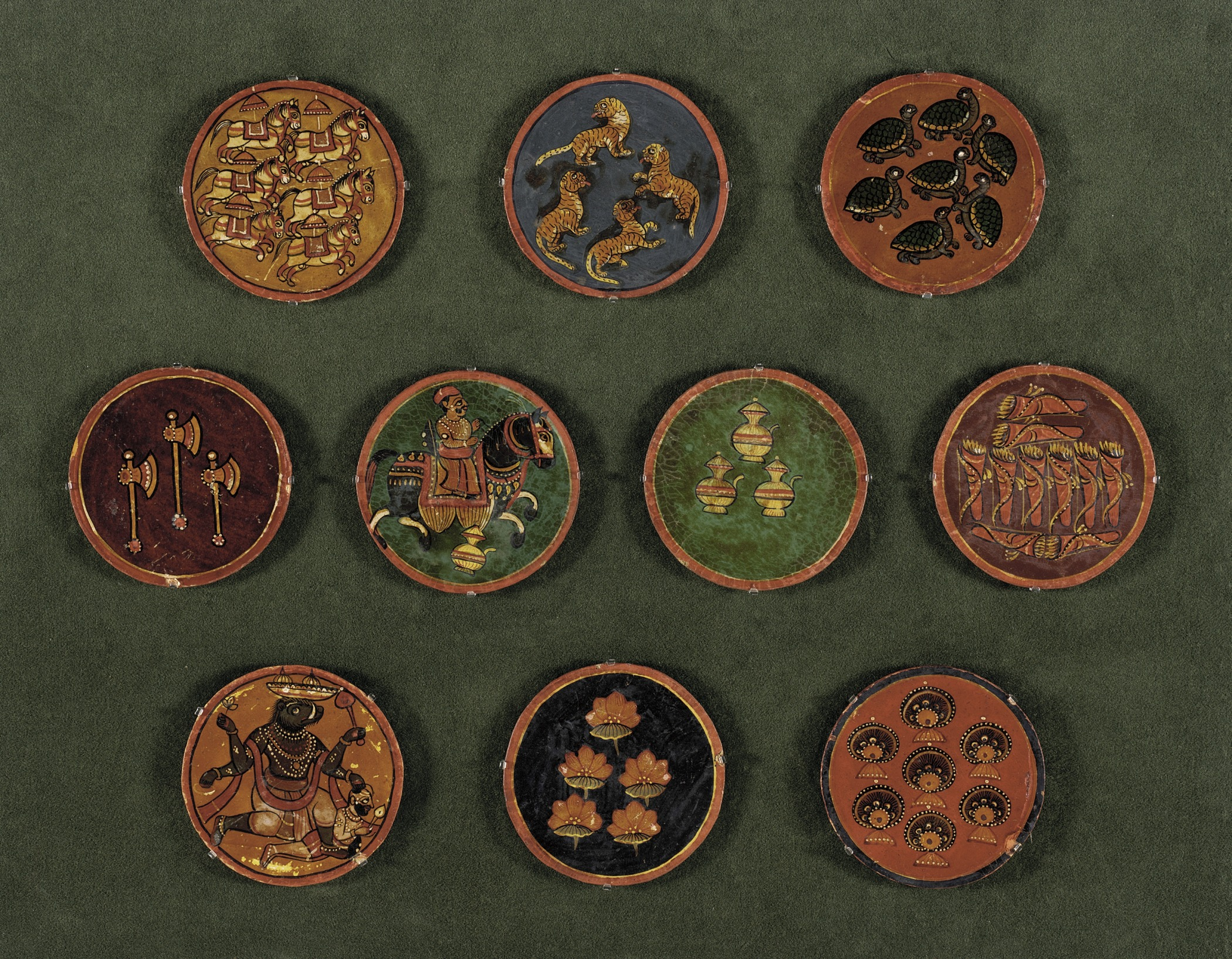
Various Ganjifa cards from Dashavatara set

Ganjifa, Ganjapa or Gânjaphâ, is a card game and type of playing cards that are most associated with Persia and India. After Ganjifa cards fell out of use in Iran before the twentieth century, India became the last country to produce them. The form prevalent in Odisha is Ganjapa.

=== As-Nas ===
In 1895, General Albert Houtum-Schindler described the rules as follows:

The game of As is exactly like Poker, but without any flushes or sequences. There are four players, and each player gets five cards, dealt to the right. The dealer puts down a stake. The first player then looks at his cards. If he "goes", he says dîdam (I have seen), and covers the stake or raises it. If he does not wish to play, he says nadîdam, (I have not seen) and throws his cards. He may also "go" without looking at his cards - that is, in poker parlance, "straddle" - and says nadîd dîdam (not seeing, I have seen). The second player, if he wishes to play, must cover the stakes, and can also raise. The third player and the dealer then act in the same way just as in poker, and when the stakes of all players are equal and no one raises any more the cards are turned up and the player holding the best hand wins the stakes.

== Animal events ==
=== Chovgan ===
Chovgan, Chowgan or Chogan (Persian: چوگان, romanized: čowgân) is a team sport with horses that originated in ancient Iran (Persia). It was considered an aristocratic game and held in a separate field, on specially trained horses. The game was widespread among the Asian peoples. It is played in Iran, Azerbaijan, Tajikistan, and Uzbekistan. It was later adopted in the Western World, known today as polo.

== See also ==
- Traditional games of South Asia
