= John Felix =

English Benedictine monk

Religious life
- Religion: Christianity
- Order: Benedictine
- Institute: St Peter's Monastery, Westminster

John Felix (fl. 1498) was an English Benedictine monk, belonging to St Peter's Monastery, Westminster.

Felix lived about the middle of the reign of Henry VII; the only record of him that remains is a short manuscript life he wrote of John Estney, abbot of Westminster, 1474–98, and some doggerel Latin verses on the same abbot, setting forth his benefactions to the church of Westminster.
