= Kerala Gauthameeyam =

Kerala Gauthameeyam is a book on Tarka sastra written in Malayalam language by Kurissery Gopala Pillai. First published in 1959, it is the pioneering work on Tarka sastra in Malayalam. Another significant effort in this direction is Kaikulangara Rama Variar's Mukthaavali. Authorship of this book gave the title 'Kerala Gauthaman' to Gopala Pillai who was a poet, researcher and scholar of Malayalam and Sanskrit languages.

It was the need of book on Nyaya in Malayalam that prompted the author to work on Kerala Gauthameeyam. It deals with the themes and topics of Tarka Samgraham by Annam Bhatan and Kaarikaavali by Vishvanatha Panchananan. The foreword was written by N. Gopala Pillai, the then principal of The Maharaja's Sanskrit College, Thiruvananthapuram. The book did not see a second edition during the author's lifetime. In 2013, the book was re-published by Kerala Bhasha Institute.
