= Bait bazi =

Game/Genre of Urdu poestry

Bait Bazi (Urdu: بیت بازی) is a verbal game and a genre of Urdu poetry played by composing verses of Urdu poems. The game is common among Urdu speakers in Pakistan and India. It is similar to Antakshari, the Sistanian Baas-o-Beyt, the Malayalam Aksharaslokam and, more generally, the British Crambo.

== Rules ==
The game starts with the first person reciting a stanza (bait) of a poem. Each following player has to reply with another verse starting with the last letter of the verse used by the previous player. A verse that has already been used in a game may not be repeated. The rules used by experienced players can be more stringent, such as allowing the use of only one poet's verses or of one theme.

== History ==
The Urdu language has a very rich poetic tradition, and the game is very popular among poetry enthusiasts particularly in Pakistan. Schools and colleges regularly organize Bait Bazi competitions. Such competitions are also held on mediums such as radio, television and now the Internet. A very popular example is the frequently played Bait Bazi segment of the popular television show "Tariq Aziz Show" a.k.a. "Bazm-e-Tariq Aziz" formerly known as Neelam Ghar of PTV. In this weekly entertainment show, participants, usually from various colleges, take part in the game and compete for an attractive prize. The show produces a lot of enthusiasm for young Urdu lovers because the selection of couplets is regarded as an important factor for determining the winner in case of a tie.

== Bait Bazi in Media ==
In the Bollywood Hindi movie Mughal-e-Azam, the song "Teri mehfil me qismat azma kar hum bhi dekhenge" is sung in a Bait Bazi competition. It is one of the best example of Bait Bazi, sung in a poetic singing competition between two groups, led by Lata Mangeshkar and Shamshad Begum.

== See also ==
- Antakshri
- Baas-o-Beyt
