= Sistani of Khorasan =

Sistani living in the Khorasan region of Iran

Regions with significant populations
- Mainly Razavi Khorasan, but also South Khorasan, and North Khorasan

Languages
- Sistani Persian

Religion
- Shia Islam

The Sistani of Khorasan are a group of Sistani people who settled in Khorasan. This group migrated from Sistan to Khorasan.

The Sistani of Khorasan speak a Sistani dialect of Persian.

Like other Sistani people, the Sistani of Khorasan are Shia Islam.

== Notable people ==
Ali Sistani - A Twelver Shia Muslim cleric that is a Sistani from Mashhad.
