= Baas-o-Beyt =

Baas-o-Beyt (Sistanian: بئث و بئت) is a special kind of rhyming game common among Sistanian people and is generally considered as a genre of Sistanian poetry (called Seytak) played by composing verses of Sistanian poems, along with some Sistanian dance and music. It is very similar to Bait bazi, Antakshari and Crambo as well.

== Etymology ==
The term Baas-o-Beyt drives from Arabic Bahs and Beyt meaning debate and two line poetry, respectively.

== Example ==
The first one starts the Baas-o-Beyt like this:

Rasido var sare rude Adimi (رسیدو ور سر رود ادیمی)
Salāmo ale'ko e' yāre ghadimi! (سلام و علیکو ائ یار قدیمی)
Bgofto dokhtarak bose' va me de (بگفتو دخترک یگ بوسئ وه مه ده)
maga kuri ke bābāyom nadidi? (مگه کوری که بابایوم ندیدی؟)

(I just got to the river Adimi,
Salutation to you, my old friend!
I said to her: Just give me a kiss, girl.
{and she answered} Can't you see my father {right around us}, you blind man?)

The next one answers like this:

Byāya bogzara mesle ame'sha (بیایه بگذره مثل أمئشه)
Aga yag bose me'dādi che me'sha? (اگه یگ بوسئ مئ دادی چه مئ شه؟)
Aga yag bose me'dādi va āshegh (اگه یگ بوسئ مئ دادی وه عاشق)
Va fardāye qiāmat kam name'sha. (وه فردای قیامت کم نمئ شه)

({Your father} is going to pass by us, like all the {other} times.
Why don't you give me a kiss?
Give a kiss to your lover
Do not be scared of anything.)

== See also ==
- Bibi Seshanbe
