= Aksharaslokam =

Poetic way of chanting slokas

Akshara Slokam (അക്ഷര ശ്ലോകം) is a traditional way of Sloka chanting, a poetic entertainment developed in the Malayalam (മലയാളം) language of Kerala, India. It is in a classical format with strict rules on the meter of quatrains called slokas or mukthaka. A number of scholars sit to recite either Sanskrit or Malayalam slokas ( with more than eight letters in a line ). Once the recitation is started the next one in the turn has to recite a sloka having the first letter of the third line of the previous sloka. This resembles the north Indian Beit bazi.

It is mostly unused, but is active as the forerunner of the present day Anthakshari (അന്താക്ഷരി). Kairali Solaka Rangam Palai, Kundoor Smaraka Sadas and Amritabharathi Aksharashloka Samiti Chunangad are some of the famous Aksharasloka institutions in Kerala. Koonammoochi aksharaslokavedi and Ariyannur aksharaslokakalakshethram have contributed to the field of publishing many books related to aksharaslokam like aksharasloka directory (the first ever and the only one till date) containing names and addresses of aksharasloka artists. There are many active groups in Kerala from Kozhikode to Thiruvananthapuram with Trichur as the hub of the revival. There is a magazine dedicated for slokam called Kavana Kauthukam published from Trichur. Akhila Kerala Aksharasloka Parishath and Kerala Aksharasloka Federation are two organisations for propagating aksharaslokam. Aksharaslokam is an item in the prestigious school youth festival of Kerala.

== Competitions ==
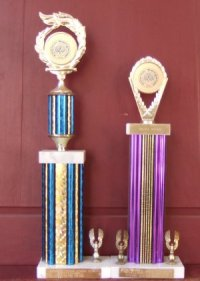
Award statues for Aksharaslokam competition

One of the prominent Aksharaslokam competitions is the one held in connection with the Thrissur Pooram. Traditionally this competition was called the "Chakolas Gold Medal". Eventually it has been renamed now as "V. Kamalakara Menon Suvarna Mudra". The first winner of the Chakolas Gold Medal was late U.P. Raghava Warrier, popularly known as UPR. That was in 1955. The second position was won by Late Chengamanad Damodaran Nambiar. The four artists who survived till the end included late N.D.Krishnan Unni and Late Kamalakara Menon.

The judges were Puthezhath Raman Menon, Zunjunni Raja and K. Vasudevan Moosad. As per tradition, participants who have won the gold medal once do not participate in the competitions again. Currently, separate competitions are held for groups separated as per their age. The Government of Kerala conducts prestigious competitions for children in connection with school yuvajanotsavams (youth festivals). The Guruvayoor Devaswam conducts two prominent competitions with gold medal as first prize. One is Sree Guruvayoorappan suvarna mudra on Guruvayoor Ekadasi day. The other is in connection with Narayaneeyam day. Slokas from Narayaneeyam alone can be chanted in the latter. E competitions and e-sadass are also conducted in the recent years from 2013 onwards.
