= Kaladont =

South Slavic word game

Kalodont or kaladont is a South Slavic word game, popular in Croatia, Montenegro, Serbia, Slovenia, Bosnia and Herzegovina and North Macedonia, in which players in turn say words, each beginning with the last two letters of the previous word.

The game is usually played by different house rules; the game either ends when kalodont is used, with the person saying it being the winner or kalodont being the only repeatable word that can be used to eliminate the previous player. Other than kalodont, used words cannot be repeated and the goal of the game is to force other players to use words ending in ka.

The name of the game originates from once popular Austrian Kalodont toothpaste brand that became synonymous with toothpaste in the region of former Yugoslavia and a common word for it. It is the winning word since there are no words in South Slavic languages that begin with nt.

== Rules ==
One of the players starts by saying a word. Then, each following player in sequence (usually clockwise or counterclockwise) must come up with a word beginning with the last two letters of the previous word. The word must have at least four letters, must be in its standard form (i.e. infinitive for verbs, nominative for nouns, etc.) may not be made-up or a proper name, and no previous word may be repeated. When one of the players cannot come up with an acceptable word, he loses the game. The winner is the player who posed the word with the difficult ending; he gets to start the next round. If a player says a word ending with -ka, the first player to say kaladont is the winner.

== See also ==
- Shiritori – Japanese word game
- Word chain
