= Bibi Seshanbe =

Persian mystical figure

- The Queen of Tuesday
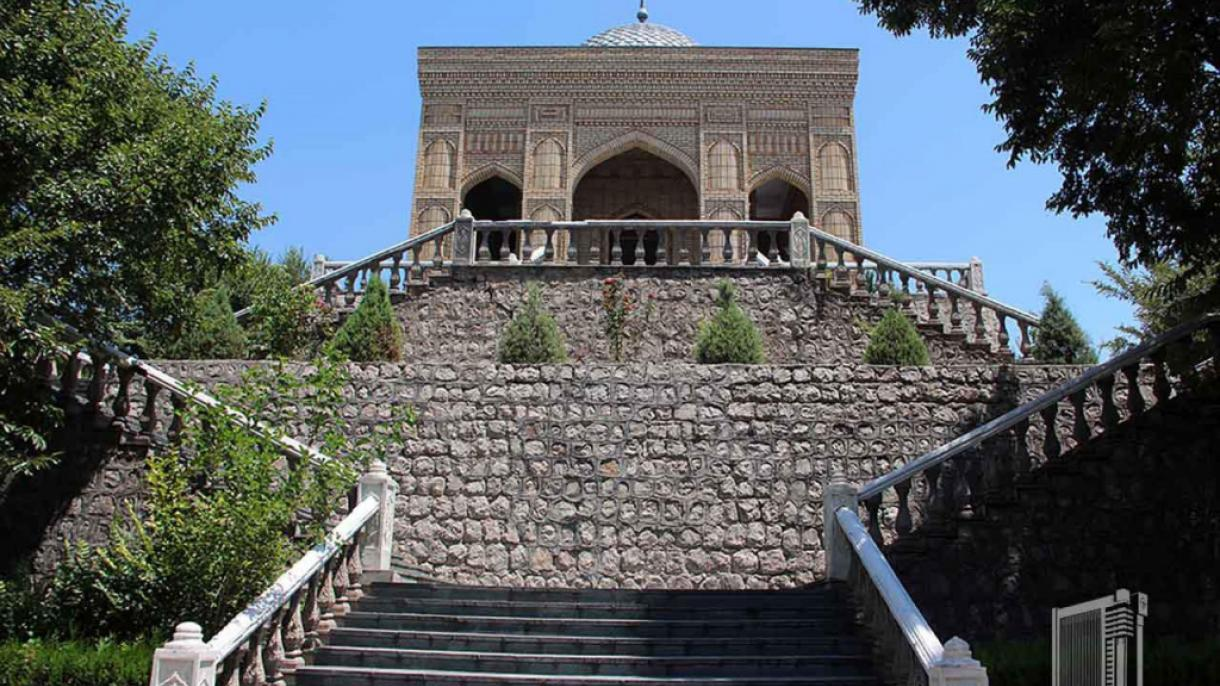
- Mausoleum in Andijan Region, Uzbekistan that is dedicated to Bibi Seshanbe
- Texts: Asoke Bibi-sa-shemma
- Gender: Woman
- Ethnic group: Persian people, particularly the Sistanian

Bibi Seshanbe (Sistanian: Bibi Sashemma), which literally means "The Queen of Tuesday," refers to a Persian mystical figure, most widely known among the Sistanian people. They consider her a holy angel who can save and cure poor and desperate people when called upon.

== Sistanian version ==
According to the Sistanian version of the Asoke Bibi-sa-shemma myth (the story of "The Queen of Tuesday"), a poor little girl stuck among a tyrant family finds a golden shoe, leading her to falling in love with the prince and saving her from such an intolerable circumstance. This story is strongly reminiscent of western fairytale Cinderella. This story is narrated only by girls and women and all the men refuse to be around the women participating in the special ritual assigned to the Asoke Bibi-sa-shemma, otherwise the above-mentioned angel not going to cure their problems. The setting of fire in this ritual derives from Zoroastrianism.
