= Shiritori =

Japanese word game

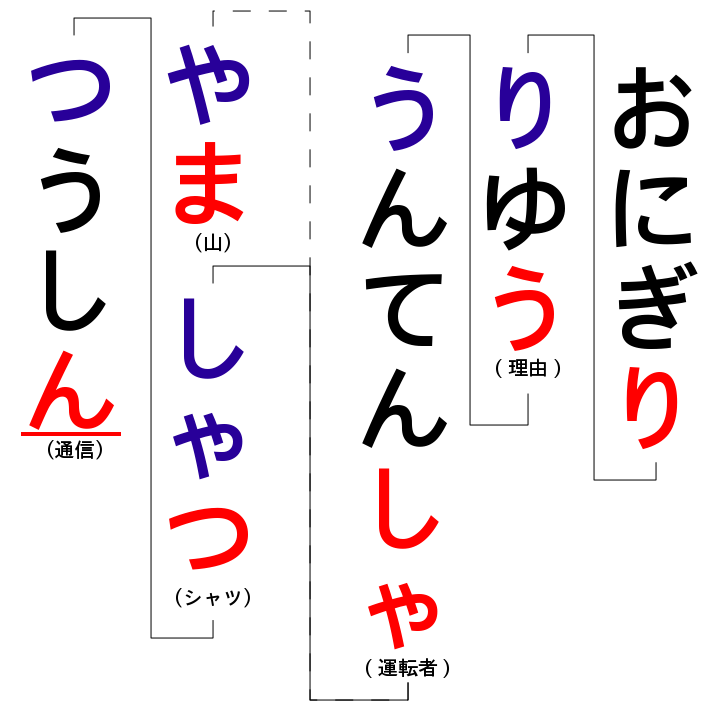
A game of shiritori progressing from right to left

Shiritori (しりとり; 尻取り) is a Japanese word game in which the players are required to say a word which begins with the final kana of the previous word. No distinction is made between hiragana, katakana, and kanji. "Shiritori" literally means "taking the end" or "taking the rear".

== Rules ==
There are various optional and advanced rules, which the players must agree on before the game begins.

=== Optional rules ===
- The first word of the game is shiritori, the name of the game itself.
- Dakuten and handakuten may be ignored or added. Thus suupu (スープ) may be followed by furo (ふろ), and sato (さと) may be followed by dorayaki (どら焼き).
- A long vowel may either be ignored or considered as a vowel. Mikisaa (ミキサー/みきさあ) can be followed by either sakura (さくら) or aki (あき).
- Common pronouns and place names may be permitted. Example: Edo jou (えどじょう, lit. 'Edo Castle'), is acceptable.
- Two words spelled with the same kana but different kanji may be permitted. For example, su (す) can either be spelled as "巣" (lit. 'a bird's nest') or "酢" (lit. 'vinegar').

=== Advanced rules ===
- Words are limited to a certain genre.
- Instead of using only the last kana, the final two kana must be used again. In this case only the first kana may not be the mora "N" (ん).
- The length of a word must be three or more syllables.

== English shiritori ==
A version of Shiritori using only English words was invented to help people learn English. Most rules are the same, yet there are several original and optional rules that are used.

- For students of English, any words - including nouns, verbs, and adjectives - can be used.
- Players cannot use different tenses of previously used verbs unless they have nonstandard conjugation. For example, a player may use "be", "was", and "is", but not both "kick" and "kicked".
- When a word ends in a silent vowel, like "life", one may either use the vowel in another word or use the preceding consonant instead.

== Similar games ==
- In English, the closest game is word chain.
- Similar Russian word games include "A Game of Words" (Игра в слова), where players are required to say a noun that begins with the final letter of the previous word, and "A Game of Cities" (Игра в города), where players are required to say a name of a city or town that begins with the final letter of the previous word.
- In Chinese languages, a similar game is known as jielong (接龍), where players start new words with the last hanzi of the preceding word. Another variant of the game is known as tzuchuan (字串), which utilises adding, removing or replacing of one of the character's components to form another character. The most popular variant of the game is known as chengyu jielong (成語接龍), which involves four character idioms instead.
- There is also a similar South Slavic game called Kalodont, in which players continue the chain by beginning with last two letters of the previous word.
- In Korean, a similar game is kkeunmaritgi (끝말잇기), in which players must say a word that starts with the last Hangul syllable of the previous word.
- In Romanian, there is a game called "Fazan" ("Pheasant"), in which players must say a word that starts with the last two letters of the previous word.

== Examples from popular culture ==
- In the Japanese version of Tomodachi Life, there is an event called Shiritori Tournament, which was changed into Word chain in the European version and kkeunmaritgi in the Korean version; the North American version lacks the game, although there is a similar event called Rap Battle.
- In episode 6 of the anime Nichijou, the characters Yūko Aioi and Mio Naganohara play a picture version of the game.
- In episode 2 of the anime Miss Kobayashi's Dragon Maid, the characters Miss Kobyashi, Tohru, and Kanna play the game (and lose by using the word dragon).
- In episode 6 of No Game No Life, Shiro and Sora face off against Jibril in materialization Shiritori, where objects appear or disappear when that object is named.
- In episode 3 of Non Non Biyori, the sisters Komari and Natsumi play Shiritori to pass time after running from home.
- In episode 2 of The Quintessential Quintuplets, Miku Nakano challenges Futaro Uesugi to a game of shiritori using names of Sengoku warlords.
- In episode 7 of Chronicles of the Going Home Club, Sakura challenges Natsuki to a game of shiritori using taboo cards on which words are written that cannot be said by either player.
- In episode 28 of Inazuma Eleven GO: Galaxy, four members of the Earth Eleven play the game together, with Maneuver forcibly ending the game early to avoid rousing suspicion over his strange answers.
- The Japanese ending theme of Pokémon Journeys is "Pokémon Shiritori", which features the game being played with names of Pokémon.
