= Khorasani dialect =

Persian language dialect

Khorasani Persian
- Xorasani Persian
- خُراسانی، خُراسونی، خُراسُنی، خِرَسَنی
- Pronunciation: Pārsi-e Xorāsāni
- Native to: Iran (Razavi Xorasan، North Xorasan، South Xorasan، Semnan، Golestan); Afghanistan (Herat, Farah, Ghor, Badghis); Turkmenistan; Tajikistan; Uzbekistan
- Region: Greater Khorasan
- Ethnicity: Persians, Tajiks
- Language family: Indo-European: Indo-Iranian; Iranic; Western Iranic; Southwestern Iranic; Persian; Western Persian; Khorasani Persian
- Early forms: Old Persian: Middle Persian; Early New Persian
- Dialects: Joveyni †; Neyshaburi; Sabzevari; Mashhadi; Tuni; Kashmari; Birjandi; Quchani; Damghani; Kuhsorkhi; Chenarani; Esfarayini; Bojnurdi; Torbat Heydari; Torbat Jami; Herati; Taybadi
- Writing system: Persian alphabet (Iran and Afghanistan); Tajik alphabet (Tajikistan and Uzbekistan)

Language codes
- ISO 639-3: –

The Khorasani (Xorasani) dialect is one of the dialects of the Persian language that some people in the historical regions of Khorasan and Qumis speak. The Khorasani dialect was spoken by the native and original people of this historical territory, which encompassed the modern-day countries of Tajikistan, Afghanistan, Uzbekistan, Turkmenistan and all the northeastern parts of Iran.

The Persian dialect of Khorasani is one of the original and important dialects of the Persian language. It is valued highly due to the large number of people who speak it and also due to the strong base that the Persian language has always had in Khorasan. Many words that were part of the Middle Persian language are still popular and have remained alive and working in Khorasani, but have been lost in other Persian dialects.

== Sub-divisions ==
The Khorasani dialect is generally divided into two groups: Eastern Khorasani and Western Khorasani.

Eastern Khorasani (or Tajiki) is spoken in central and eastern parts of Afghanistan and Tajikistan.

Western Khorasani is spoken in Khorasan province, eastern Semnan province, Persian-speaking people in eastern Golestan province and Herat province, which is different from eastern Khorasan.

== Distribution ==
The Khorasani Persian dialect is the only Iranian Persian dialect that is spoken outside of Iran. It is spoken in the east from Herat, from the west to the border of Mazandaran (Shahroud, Damghan), and from the north in Bojnourd. However, as we move towards the north of Khorasan, the presence of Kurdish and Turkic languages of Khorasan and the effects of these two languages on the Persian dialect of the region increases. From the south of Khorasan to the nearby city of Nehbandan, the dialects of Sistan and Kerman become more apparent.

== Ivanov and Kolbasi's Classification of Khorasani Persian ==
Ivanov divides the Khorasani dialects into three main groups: the northern group, which is spoken in Joveyn, Sabzevar and Neyshabur; the central group which is common in Torshiz and Gonabad; and the southern group whose speakers live in Qaen, Tun and Birjand. In his opinion, the difference between these three groups is very small and they cannot be considered separate dialects; In addition, these groups have borrowed many words from each other.

However, unlike Ivanov, Kolbasi places the dialects of Khorasan region under a distinct branch of the modern south western Iranian languages, with varieties including Sabzevari, Neyshaburi, Kashmari, Kakhki, Qaeni and Birjandi among the dialects, while considering Mashadi as a standard dialect of standard Iranian Persian.

== Numbers ==
Numbers in the Khorasani Persian dialect are not very different from standard Persian, but differ in pronunciation.

Xorasani Persian	Avestan	Hindi	Standard Persian	English
yak	aevâ	ek	yek	one
du/di	dvâ	do	do	two
se	θeri	tîn	seh	three
čâr	čâθwâr	čâr	čâhâr	four
panj	pančâ	pânč	panj	five
šiš	xšvaš	čhah	šeš	six
haft	haptâ	sât	haft	seven
hašt	aštâ	âṭh	hašt	eight
noh	navâ	nau	noh	nine
dah	dasâ	das	dah	ten
