= G. Kamalamma =

Indian writer

- Born: 1930; Perumbuzha, Kundara, Kerala, India
- Died: 2012 (aged 81–82)
- Occupations: Author, literarian, teacher, social worker

G. Kamalamma, (1930–2012) was a school teacher for most of her professional life, and was an author, mostly in the spheres of language and literature, socio-cultural subjects and biography. She wrote over 30 books, all in the Malayalam language, and won citations and awards from both the Sahitya Academy of India and the Sahitya Academy of Kerala.

== Birth and early life ==
Kamalamma was born in 1930 in Perumbuzha village near Kundara in Kollam district, Kerala. Her father Sahitya-shiromani M. K. Govindan (1901~1968) was a Sanskrit scholar, professor and writer; the son of Kunjan Channaar of Mundupoyikavila house in Perumbuzha. Kamalamma's mother was Gowrikutty, the daughter of Kavila Perumal Govindan of Perinad, in Kollam.

== Professional career ==
After graduating, as BA and BT, Kamalamma began her professional career as a Social Education Organizer in the Development Department of the Government of Kerala, where she worked for the first ten years. When India launched the world's first family planning program in 1952, she gave wide reach to the program, educating rural women about family planning and the use of contraceptives. In 1963, she took up job as a teacher, working for twenty four years before retiring from her academic career in 1987.

While working in her official capacities, Kamalamma began a parallel career as an author, focusing on areas of interest to her such as Malayalam language and literature, transliteration of Western literature into the Malayalam language, children's literature and biographical profiling. All through, she spearheaded social and community service and educational and literary activities by women.

Ezhava Samudayathile Maharathanmar – A historical compilation of biographical profiles of 411 prominent individuals of the Ezhava community

=== Biographies ===
- Kasthuribai Gandhi – (A profile on the life of Mahatma Gandhi's wife Kasturba Gandhi) (In Malayalam & English) (Many Editions)
- Sarojini Naidu – (A profile on the life of Sarojini Naidu)
- Sree Narayana Guru Jeevithavum Darsanavum – (The life and vision of Sree Narayana Guru)
- N. Gopala Pillai – (A biographic profile of N. Gopala Pillai, a Sanskrit scholar, author and ex-Principal of the Government Sanskrit College, Thiruvananthapuram) Cultural Affairs Department, Government of Kerala

=== Translations ===
- Robinson Crusoe – (a translation of Daniel Defoe's novel Robinson Crusoe into the Malayalam language) SPCS, Poorna Publishers (Many Editions)
- Iliad (a translation of Homer's work into the Malayalam language) Kerala Sahitya Academy
- Iliad (Abridged) (a translation of Homer's work into the Malayalam language) SPCS, Poorna Publishers (Many Editions)
- Odyssey (a translation of Homer's work into the Malayalam language) SPCS, Poorna Publishers (Many Editions)

=== Studies ===
- Asan Sahithya Praveshika (Introduction to Asan's literature) SPCS
- Ulloor Sahithya Praveshika (Introduction to Ulloor's literature) DC Current Books
- Vallathol Sahithya Pravesika – (Collection of written material related to Vallathol Narayana Menon) Marar Sahitya Prakasham
- Ezhava Samudayathile Maharathanmaar – (Great leaders of the Ezhava community).
- Sree Narayanante Kshetra Sankalpam – (Sree Narayana's Concept of Temples)
- Malayala Bhashayude Adiverukal – (A study on the roots of Malayalam language) DC Current Books
- Malayala Bhashaye Dhanyamakkiya Christian Missionarimar (Contributions by Christian Missionaries to the Malayalam language) Carmel International Publishing House
- Karuna Natakavum Kathaprasangakalayum Attakkathayum Mattum (Some Visual-Narrative art forms of Kerala) Rainbow Book Publishers
- Nakshathrangalum Grahangalum: Alpam Varthamanam (Popular Astronomy) Rainbow Book Publishers

=== Collections ===
- Akshara Sloka Ranjini – (Akshara Sloka Collection of Slokas) DC Current Books (Many Editions)
- Akshara Sloka Rathnavali – (Akshara Sloka gemstring) DC Current Books (Many Editions)
- Akshara Sloka Rasikaranjini – (Akshara Sloka Collection of Slokas – Ekavrittam) Rainbow Book Publishers
- Pazhamayude Artha Thalangal (The Connotations of Heritage) DC Current Books (Many Editions)
- Thiruvathirappattukal (Collection of Thiruvathira songs) DC Current Books.
- Kavyamritam (Poetic excerpts) Rainbow Book Publishers
- Sreenarayanagurudeva Vachanamritam (Collection)

=== Poetry ===
- Ampilithoni (Poems) Saindhava Books
- G. Kamalammayude Kavithakal (Poems) Saindhava Books
- Sreenarayanagurudevasankeerthananam

=== Books for neoliterates ===
- Sree Narayana Guru – Kerala Granthashalasangham
- Maharashtravum Gujarathum – Kerala Granthashalasangham
- Tagore – Kerala Granthashalasangham
- Arivulla Ammamar (Knowledgeable Mothers) – Kerala University (Adult Education)
- Agathikalude Amma – KANFED

=== Children's literature ===
- Kuttikalude Kasthuribai Gandhi – (A profile on the life of Mahatma Gandhi's wife Kasturba Gandhi) – Kerala State Institute of Children's Literature
- Kuttikalude Mahatma Gandhi – Kerala State Institute of Children's Literature
- Kuttikalude Iliad (a translation of Homer's work into the Malayalam language) – Kerala State Institute of Children's Literature
- Nadunarunnu
- Punyateertham – (Holy Water) Publications Division, Government of India

== Awards and citations ==
Kamalamma won the following awards and citations:

- Ulloor Smaraka Samithi's Ulloor Endowment Award 2011
- Government of Kerala's award for remarkable service as a teacher for the year 1985–86.
- Kerala Sahitya Academy award for children's literature for the year 1965.
- Government of India's award for authoring the best book on innovative literature for the year 1964.
- Government of India's award for authoring the best book on innovative literature for the year 1956.
