= Sistani Persians =

Ethnic group of Persian people

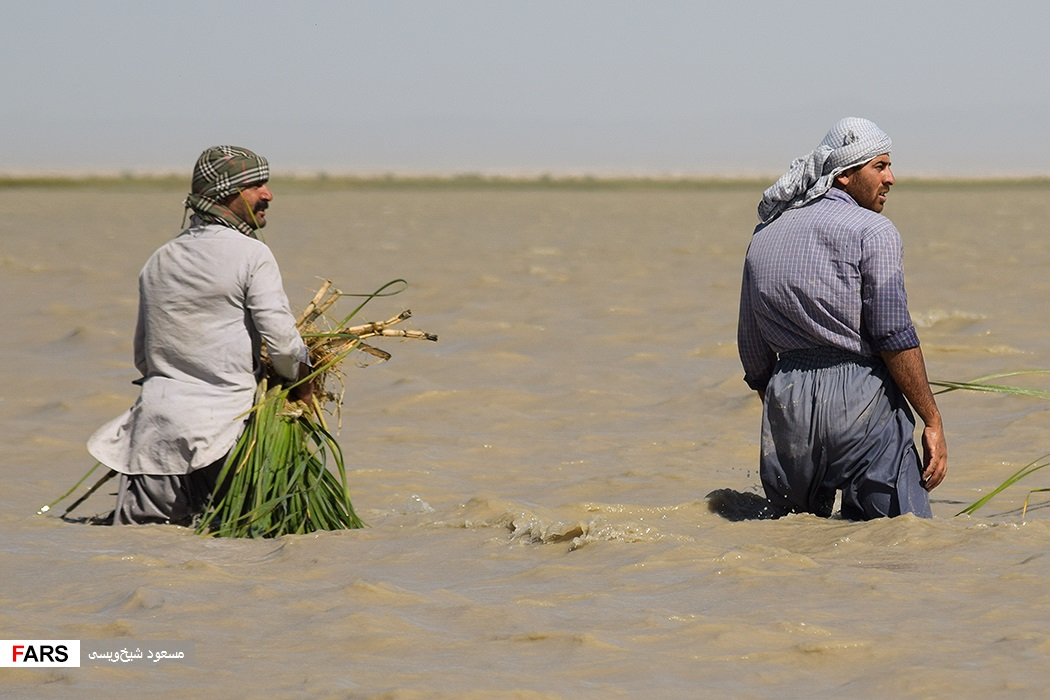
- Sistani Persians near the Hamoun Lake

Regions with significant populations
- North of Sistan and Baluchistan province

Languages
- Sistani Persian

Religion
- Shia Islam

Related ethnic groups
- Other Iranian peoples

The Sistani Persians (Persian: فارس‌های سیستانی) (also known as the Sistanis, Sajestani, and historically referred to Sagzi) are a branch of Persians who mainly live in Iranian Sistan in southeastern Iran.

They inhabit the northern parts of Sistan and Baluchistan province. In recent decades, many Sistani people have also migrated to other parts of Iran, such as the provinces of Tehran and Golestan in northern Iran. Sistanis speak a dialect of Persian known as Sistani.

== Etymology ==
Sistanis derive their name from Sakastan ("the land of the Saka"). The Sakas were a Scythian tribe migrated to the Iranian Plateau. The more ancient Old Persian name of the region – prior to Saka dominance – was Zaranka or Drangiana ("waterland"). This older form is also the root of the name Zaranj, capital of the Afghan Nimruz Province. The Drangians were listed among the peoples ruled by the legendary King Ninus before the Achaemenids. Its people were Zoroastrian. Sistan had a very strong connection with Zoroastrianism and during Sassanid times Lake Hamun was one of two pilgrimage sites for followers of that religion. In Zoroastrian tradition, the lake is the keeper of Zoroaster's seed and just before the final renovation of the world, three maidens will enter the lake, each then giving birth to the saoshyans who will be the saviours of mankind at the final renovation of the world.

In the Shahnameh, Sistan is also referred to as Zabulistan, after the region in the eastern part of present-day Afghanistan. In Ferdowsi's epic, Zabulistan is in turn described to be the homeland of the mythological hero Rostam.

== History ==
=== Early history ===
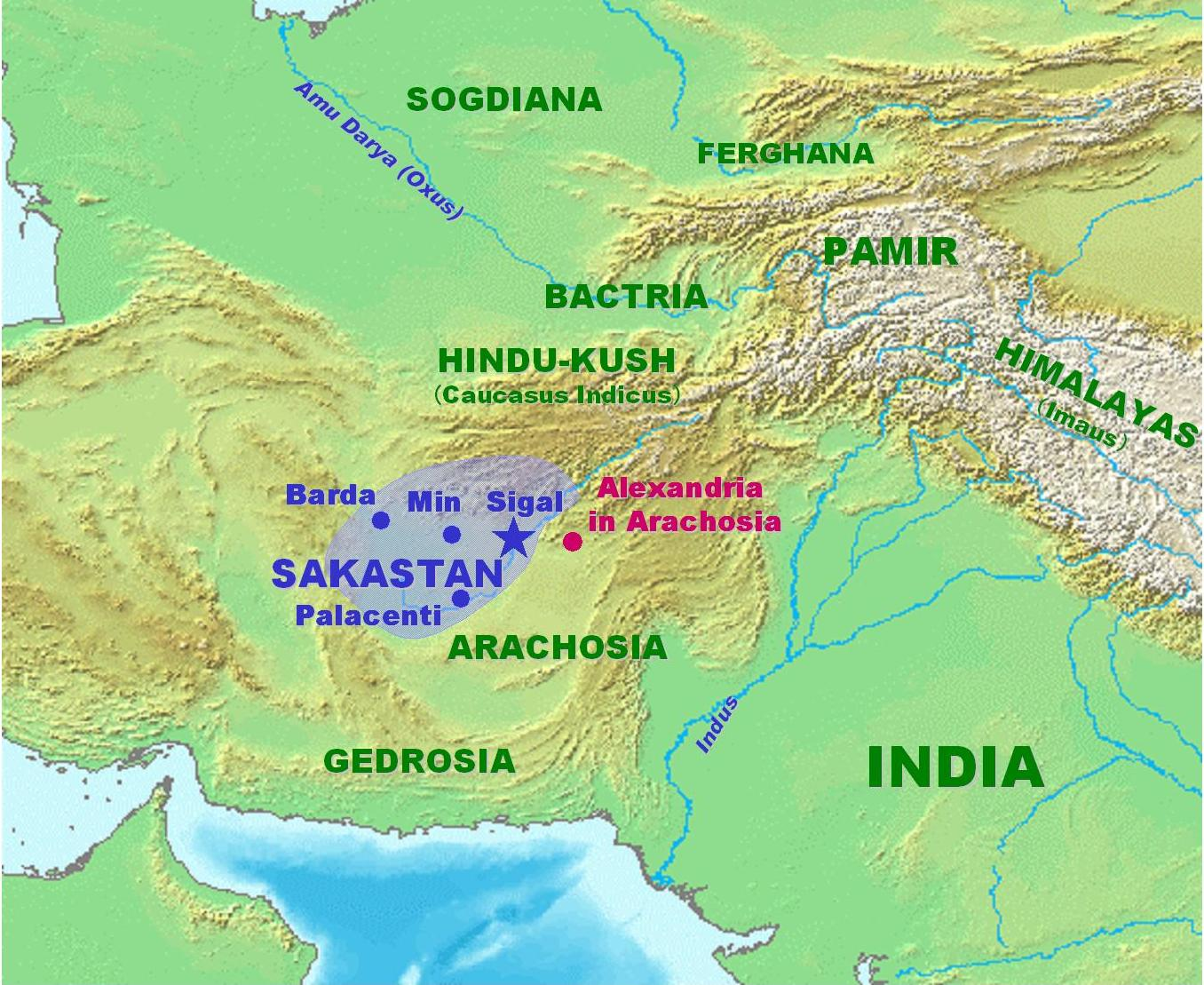
Map of Sistan, historically also known as Sakastan, the homeland of the Sistanis

The Drangians were listed among the peoples ruled by the legendary King Ninus before the Achaemenids.

=== Sassanian era ===
The province was formed in ca. 240, during the reign of Shapur I, in his effort to centralise the empire; before that, the province was under the rule of the Parthian Suren Kingdom, whose ruler Ardashir Sakanshah became a Sasanian vassal Its people were Zoroastrian. Sistan had a very strong connection with Zoroastrianism and during Sassanid times Lake Hamun was one of two pilgrimage sites for followers of that religion. In Zoroastrian tradition, the lake is the keeper of Zoroaster's seed and just before the final renovation of the world, three maidens will enter the lake, each then giving birth to the saoshyans who will be the saviours of mankind at the final renovation of the world.

=== Islamic conquest ===
During the Muslim conquest of Persia, the last Sasanian king Yazdegerd III fled to Sakastan in the mid-640s, where its governor Aparviz (who was more or less independent), helped him. However, Yazdegerd III quickly ended this support when he demanded tax money that he had failed to pay.

In 650, Abd-Allah ibn Amir, after having secured his position in Kerman, sent an army under Mujashi ibn Mas'ud to Sakastan. After having crossed the Dasht-i Lut desert, Mujashi ibn Mas'ud arrived to Sakastan. However, he suffered a heavy defeat and was forced to retreat.

One year later, Abd-Allah ibn Amir sent an army under Rabi ibn Ziyad Harithi to Sakastan. After some time, he reached Zaliq, a border town between Kirman and Sakastan, where he forced the dehqan of the town to acknowledge Rashidun authority. He then did the same at the fortress of Karkuya, which had a famous fire temple, which is mentioned in the Tarikh-i Sistan. He then continued to seize more land in the province. He thereafter besieged Zrang, and after a heavy battle outside the city, Aparviz and his men surrendered. When Aparviz went to Rabi to discuss about the conditions of a treaty, he saw that he was using the bodies of two dead soldiers as a chair. This horrified Aparviz, who in order to spare the inhabitants of Sakastan from the Arabs, made peace with them in return for heavy tribute, which included a tribute of 1,000 slave boys bearing 1,000 golden vessels. Sakastan was thus under the control of the Rashidun Caliphate.

=== Post-Arab Islamic era ===
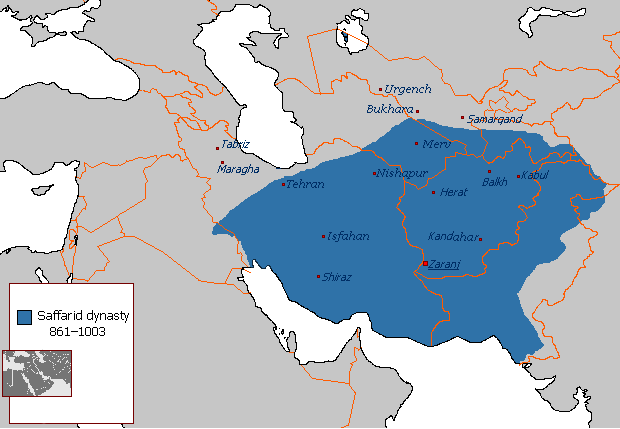
Saffarid dynasty 861–1003

The Saffarid dynasty, which was the first fully independent Iranian empire after the Arab rule, was founded by Ya’qub Bin Laith Saffari. Ya'qub worked as a coppersmith (ṣaffār) before becoming a warlord. He conquered most of present-day Iran and after seizing control of the Sistan region also began conquering most of Pakistan, and Afghanistan, and later on, Tajikistan, Turkmenistan and Uzbekistan.

== Language ==
The people of Sistani speak Sistani dialect, which is one of the dialects of the Persian language. On the one hand, this dialect has more lexical and grammatical kinship with the existing and past Khorasani and beyond than with the dead dialects of Mawara Al Nahri and current [Tajik]. Lexicographers have mentioned Sistani dialect as one of the four abandoned Persian dialects. Abureyhan al-Biruni in "Al-Saidna", has given some words from the old Sistani language.

Many of Sistani's words have not changed much since a thousand years ago. Although the original language, which is probably Segzi, has already become extinct and only its dialect remains.

A religious hymn in the Sistani dialect remains, which is attributed to the end of the Sassanid period. The song Karkuye Bonfire has been one of the most beautiful religious hymns of the Zoroastrians of Sistan, which was sung loudly while lighting the bonfires.

== Clothing ==
"Sistani clothing" is the traditional and local clothing of the people of Sistan and derived from culture, geography and thousands of years of coexistence with nature in the past and present.

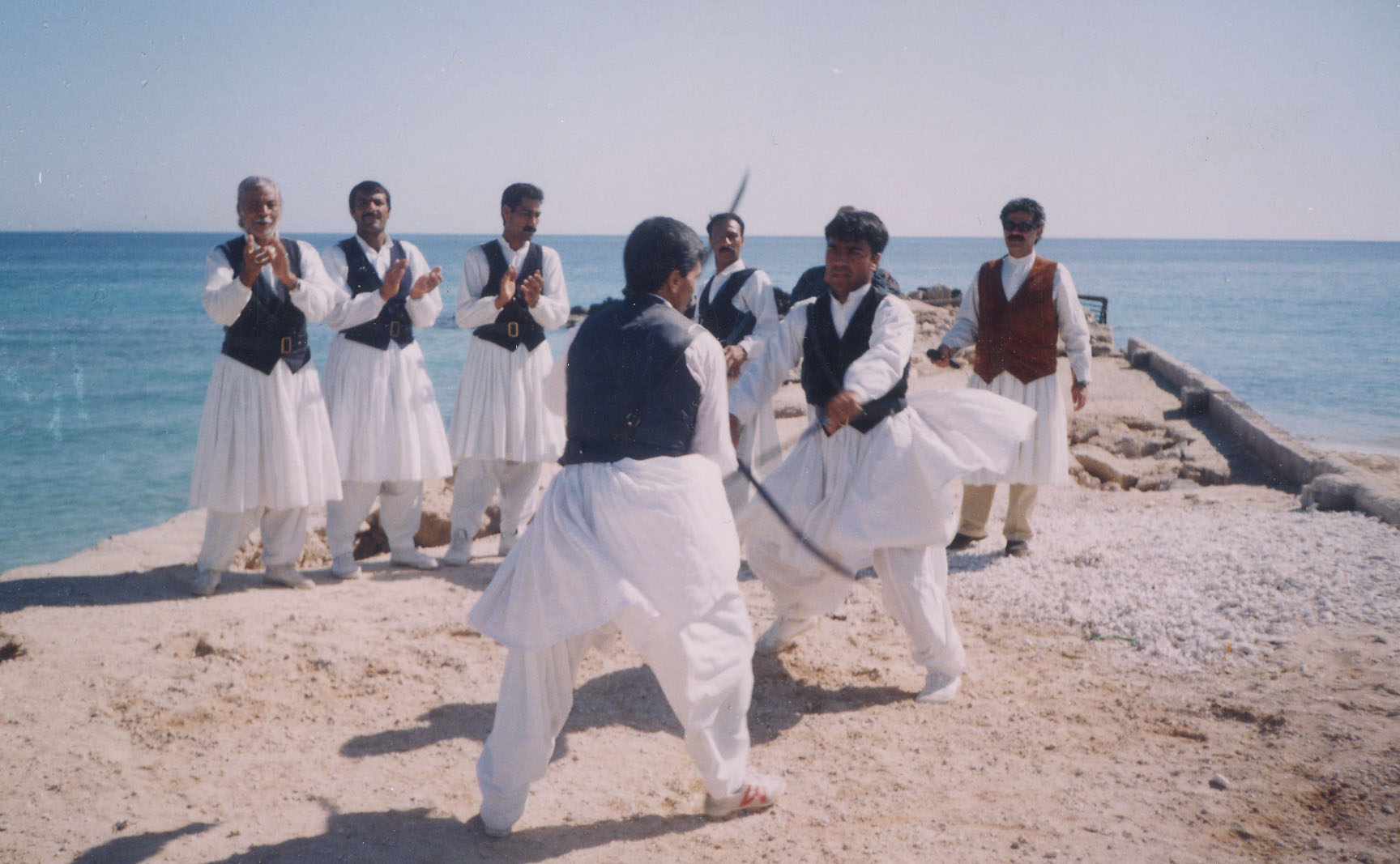
Sistani men's clothes while dancing with swords

Men's clothing Sistan mainly includes girdle, hood, shirt and pants.

Dastar is called "Lengote" in the local dialect, which is mostly white in color. Men's shirts are long and knee-length. These shirts are used in 3 pleated, saree, and torn models. Usually, regardless of the shape of the shirt, the pants are also plain or pleated. Silk embroidery is done on the clothes of wealthy people. In local dialect of Sistan, trousers are called Tamo or Tumon and shirts are called Penr and the cracked type is called Chel Treez which is from the lower part The sleeve-down loop consists of at least 34 cracks. Also, Sistani men wear a vest over their shirt, which is called "Jalezqa".

Sistani women's clothing is also simple and with designs. Women's clothes are long and loose like men's. Sistani women, in addition to their traditional and daily clothes, also prepare some kind of clothes for holidays and celebrations. One of the characteristics of Sistani women's everyday clothes is a type of needlework that is used on the collar and cuffs of clothes, which is called "black embroidery" in the local dialect. This outfit consists of a shirt and loose pants. The length of the shirt is below the knee and it is pleated around the waist. They also wear a rectangular headscarf. Festivals and happy events that consist of pleated pants, a shirt up to the knee with two slits on both sides. They also wear a pleated skirt, which is called "temu" and it is knee-length. The width of the skirt reaches 9 meters. The handle used in this dress is three ears. An example of this dress has also been seen in the traditional clothes of Khorasan women. Also, two-necked shirt, Tajik shirt, lace and chador are part of Sistani women's local clothing.

== Culture and Art ==
"Sistani culture" refers to a group of distinct cultural characteristics of the Sistani people and includes social values and existing norms as well as knowledge, beliefs, arts, laws, and customs that exist among the Sistani people is prevalent.

=== Handicrafts ===
Sistan handicrafts are among the traditional handicrafts of Iran, with a history in the region dating back centuries. As with other Iranian ethnic groups, artisans in Sistan have historically produced handwoven and decorative items using techniques passed down through generations.

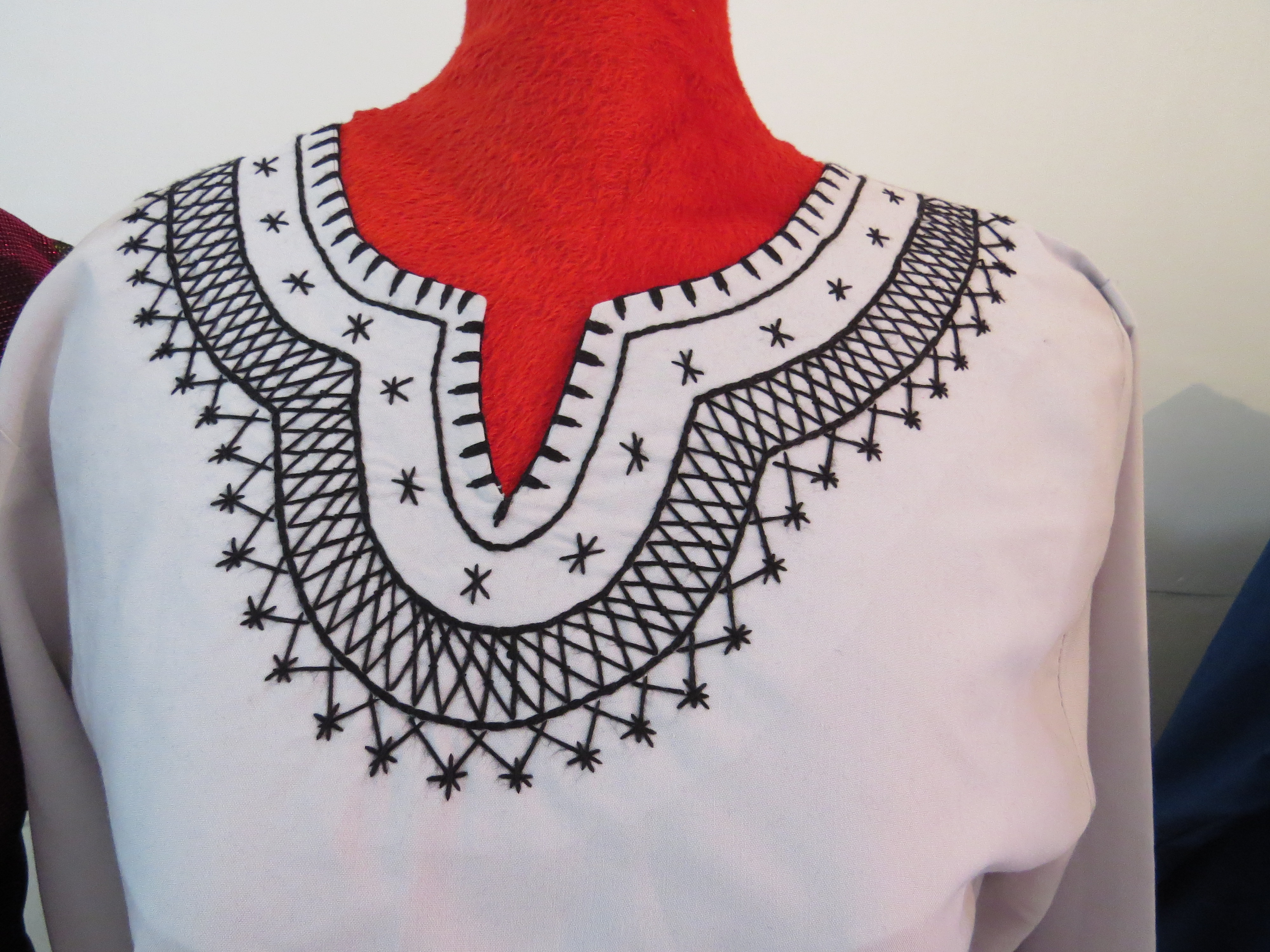
Sistani black embroidery on clothes

=== Cooking ===
Sistani cooking is a style and method of cooking among the Sistani people. Although over the centuries, Sistani cuisine has been influenced by the cuisines of various cultures, it is still unique and diverse in its own way. Many of the dishes of the neighboring cultures of Sistan's people have also been influenced by Sistan's cuisine.

==== History ====
The history of Sistani cooking method is very old like the history of Sistan people. Sistani's cooking method is different from others in terms of its historical roots and its uniqueness. The Sistani cooking method is similar to the Eastern cooking method based on its preparation and taste, as well as its spices.

== Notable people ==
- Morteza Motahhari - A Twelver Shia Muslim cleric who is a Sistani from Fariman.

== See also ==
- Bibi Seshanbe
- Baas-o-Beyt
- Sistan
- Sistani of Khorasan
- Sistani clothing

== Sources ==
- Marshak, B.I.; Negmatov, N.N. (1996). "Sogdiana". In B.A. Litvinsky, Zhang Guang-da and R. Shabani Samghabadi (ed.). History of Civilizations of Central Asia, Volume III: The Crossroads of Civilizations: A.D. 250 to 750. UNESCO. ISBN 92-3-103211-9.
- Morony, M. (1986). "ʿARAB ii. Arab conquest of Iran". Encyclopaedia Iranica, Vol. II, Fasc. 2. pp. 203–210.
- Pourshariati, Parvaneh (2008). Decline and Fall of the Sasanian Empire: The Sasanian-Parthian Confederacy and the Arab Conquest of Iran. London and New York: I.B. Tauris. ISBN 978-1-84511-645-3.
- Zarrinkub, Abd al-Husain (1975). "The Arab conquest of Iran and its aftermath". The Cambridge History of Iran, Volume 4: From the Arab Invasion to the Saljuqs. Cambridge: Cambridge University Press. pp. 1–57. ISBN 978-0-521-20093-6.
