= Kalodont =

Toothpaste brand

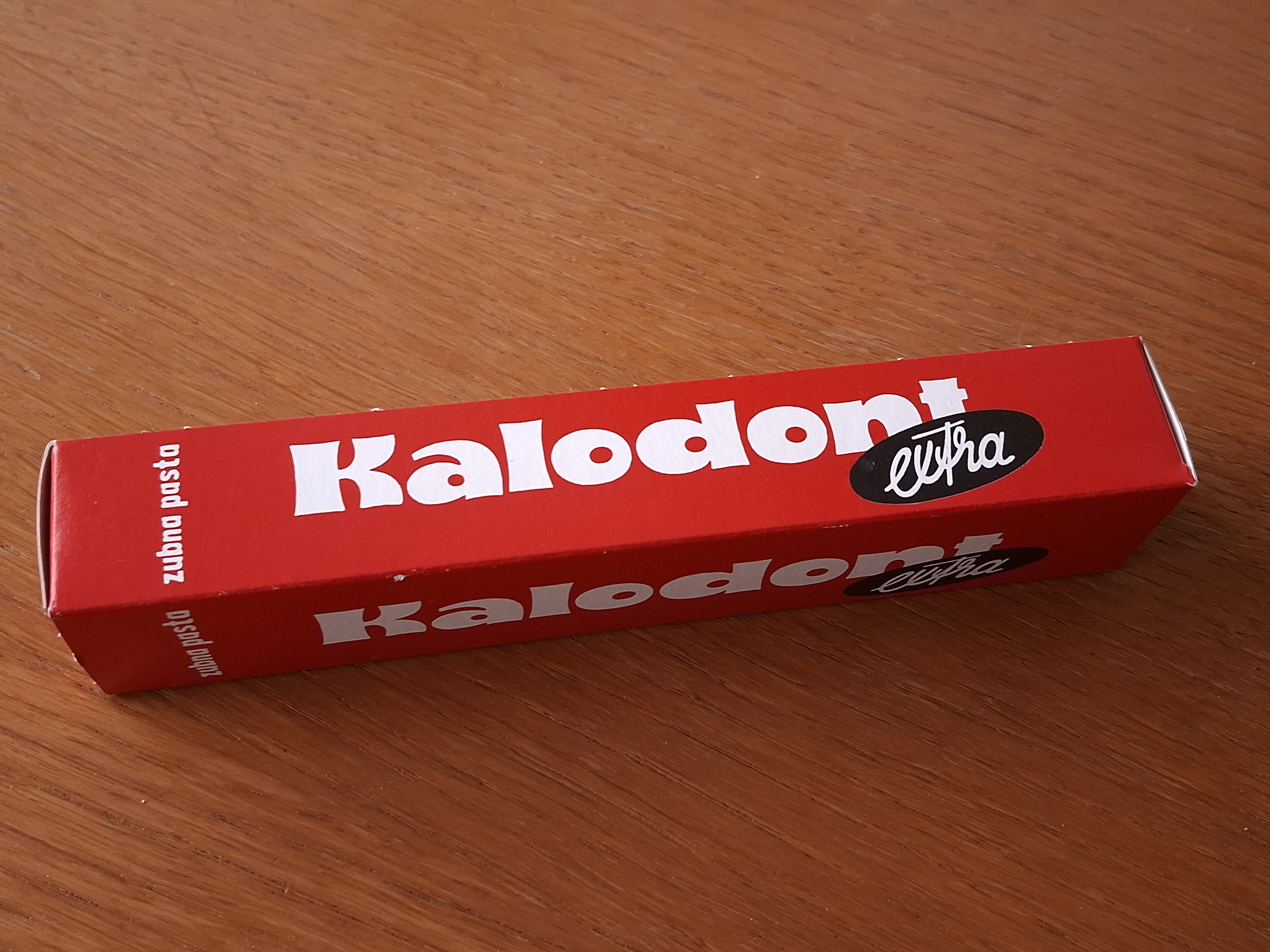
Retro packaging of Kalodont Extra from 2024

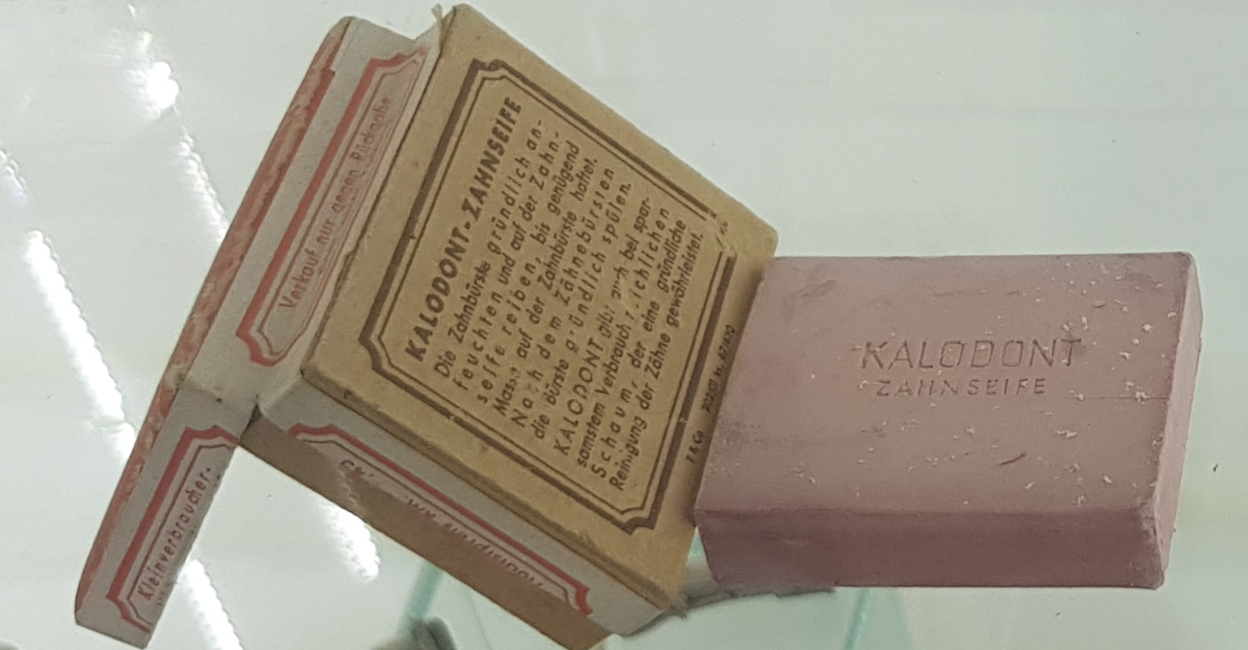
Original Kalodont tooth "paste"

Kalodont is a toothpaste brand by Croatian manufacturer Saponia, based in Osijek.

The original product was manufactured by F. A. Sarg's Sohn & Co. from Vienna, and sold in Austria-Hungary starting with 1887. It later became widely distributed, in 34 other countries, and obtained a near-monopoly status that caused the word "kalodont" to become synonymous with the word for "tooth paste" in South Slavic languages. It was also advertised and sold in Russia in 1927. Production, at the time based in Yugoslavia, ceased in 1981, but the product returned to the market in 2012, as Saponia attempted to revitalize its old brands.

Aside from being a toothpaste brand, the name is used for a popular South Slavic word game.

== See also ==
- List of toothpaste brands
- Index of oral health and dental articles
- List of defunct consumer brands
