= Gholamali Raisozzakerin =

Iranian anthropologist (1939–2021)

Gholamali Raeesolzakerin Dehbani (Persian: غلامعلی رئیس الذاکرین دهبانی) better known as Raeesolzakerin, (31 March 1939 – 23 September 2021) was an Iranian author, anthropologist, poet and singer. He was best known for his Sistanian poems and mainly considered as the father of modern Sistanian poetry.
