= Sistani clothing =

Traditional clothing of the Sistani people

Sistani clothing is the traditional attire of the people of Sistan. It reflects the region's culture, geography, and centuries of adaptation to the natural environment.

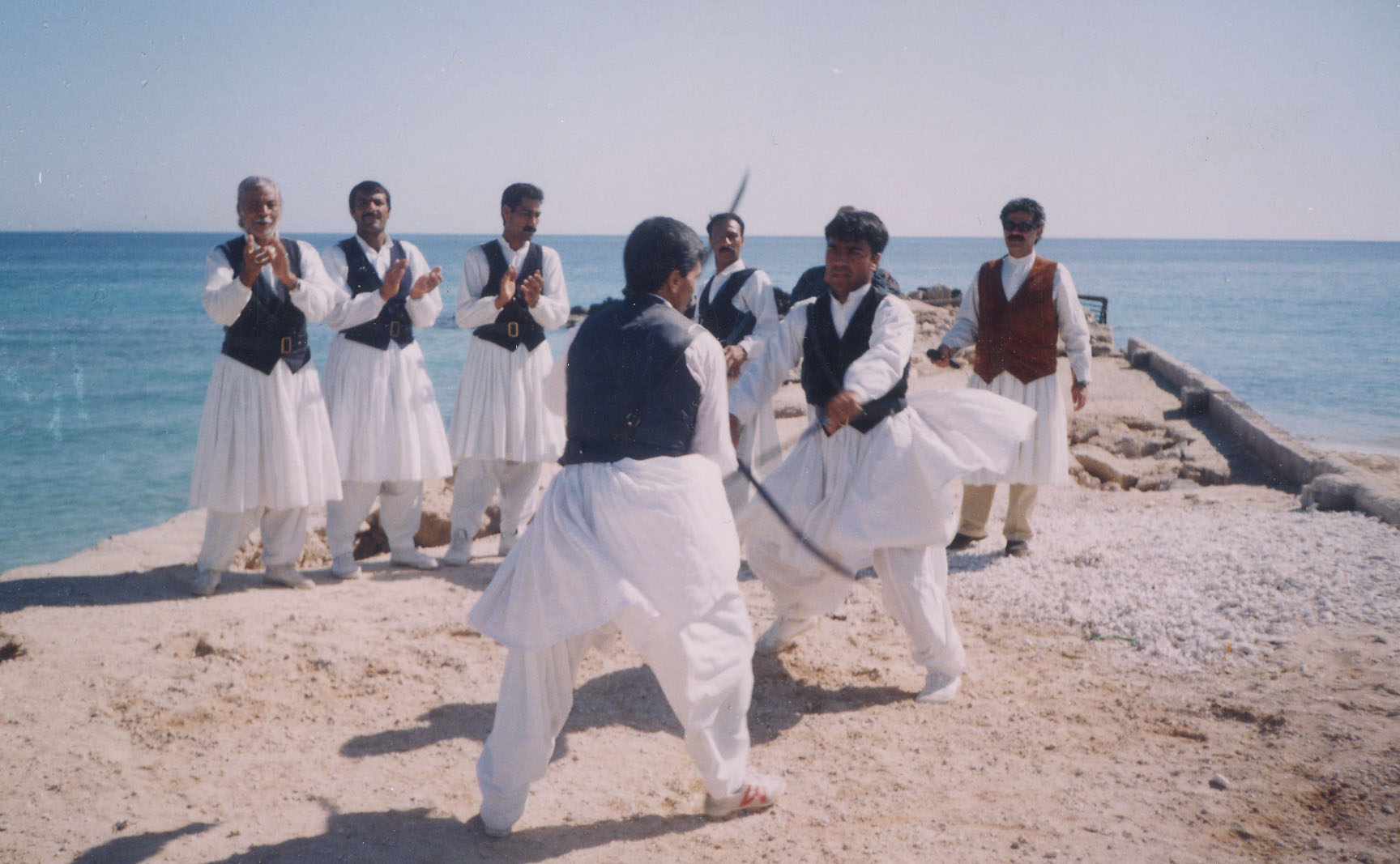
Sistani clothing

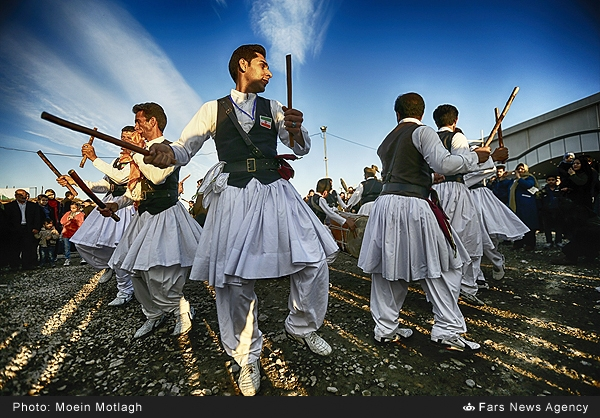

== Men's clothing ==
Sistani men's clothing includes turbans, hats, shirts, and pants. The turban, known locally as a "langote," is typically white. Men's shirts are long, knee-length, and come in three different styles. Regardless of the shirt's design, the pants are usually plain or pleated. Silk embroidery is often featured in the clothing of the wealthy. In the local Sistani dialect, trousers are called "temu" or "tumon," and the shirt is referred to as "paner." A cracked style of shirt, called "chel treez," features at least 34 slits from the bottom of the sleeve to the hem. Sistani men also wear a vest over their shirt, known as a "jalzgah."

== Women's clothing ==
Sistani women's clothing is similarly simple and long, resembling men's attire in its loose fit. In addition to their traditional, everyday clothing, Sistani women also prepare special garments for holidays and celebrations. One distinctive feature of their daily clothing is a form of needlework called siah dozi, which is applied to the collar and cuffs of the dress.

The typical outfit consists of a long shirt and loose pants, with the shirt extending below the knee and pleated at the waist. A rectangular headscarf is commonly worn as well. For festive occasions, the attire includes pleated trousers, a knee-length shirt with side slits, and a pleated skirt called temu, which reaches the knee and can be as wide as 9 meters. The outfit also incorporates a handle known as three ears. Similar designs are seen in the traditional clothing of women from Khorasan. Other elements of Sistani women's local clothing include the two-necked shirt, Tajik shirt, lace, and chador.

== National register ==
Sistani traditional clothing has been included in Iran's list of spiritual heritage and has been officially registered. Additionally, the skill of sewing Sistani clothing has been registered as a national heritage of Iran, under registration number 1268.

== See also ==
- Sistani people
- Sistan
