= Kurissery Gopala Pillai =

Scholar in Malayalam and Sanskrit Language

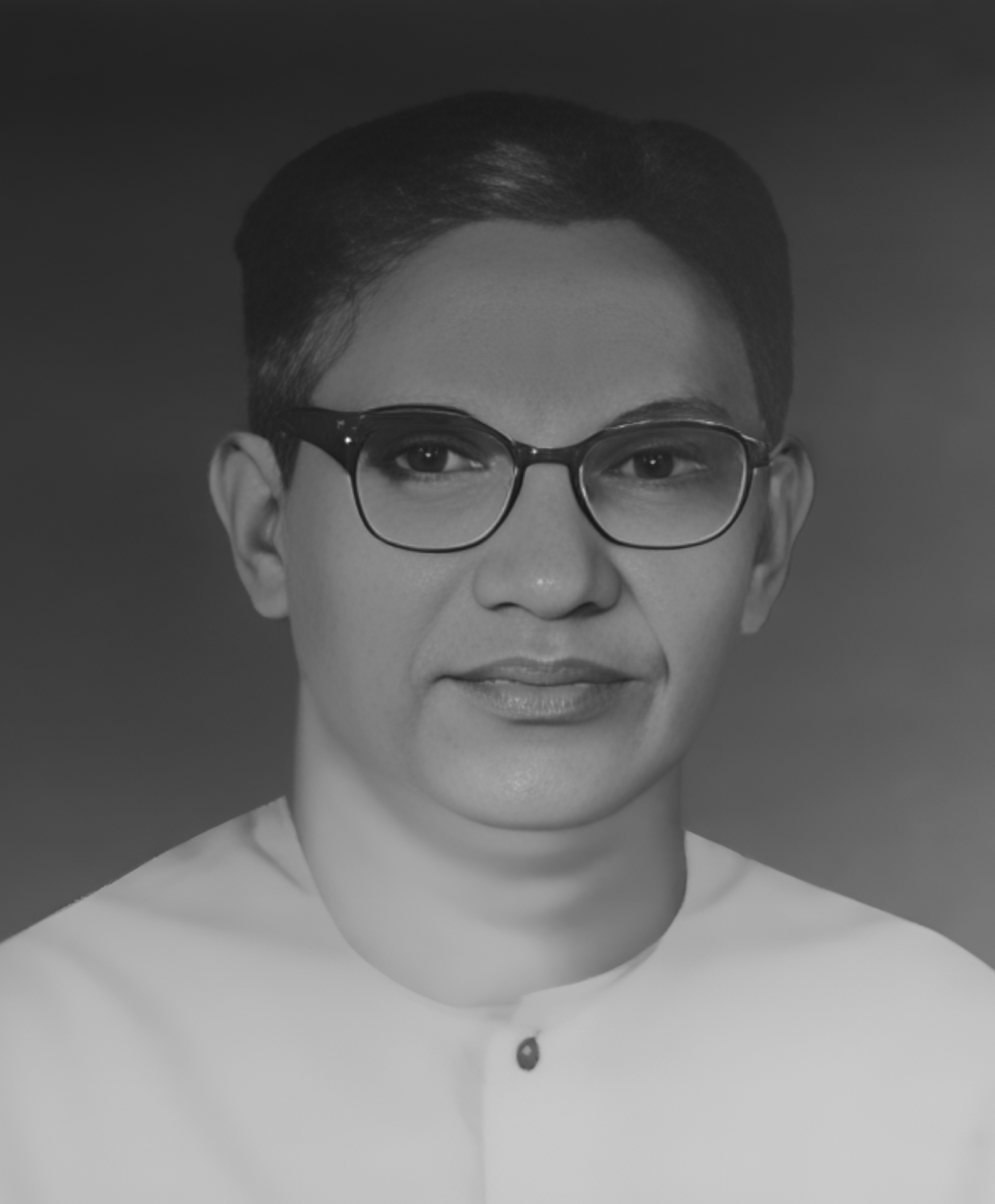
- Kurissery Gopala Pillai
- Born: 3 March 1914; Panmana, Kollam, Travancore
- Died: 5 May 1978 (aged 64); Panmana, Kerala, India
- Education: Sastry, Upadhyaya
- Spouse: Saudamini Amma
- Children: 2 daughters and 2 sons.

Kurissery Gopala Pillai (3 March 1914 – 5 May 1978) was an orientalist, researcher, lexicographer, poet, essayist, grammarian and scholar of Malayalam and Sanskrit languages. He specialised in Comparative study of languages.

== Biography ==
He was born to Cheruvilayil Padmanabha Pillai and L. Kalyani Amma on 3 March 1914 at Panmana in Kollam district. He married P. Soudamini Amma in 1943. He is survived by two daughters and two sons.

== Education ==
He did his schooling in Panmana Manayil High School and later joined the H.H The Maharaja's Sanskrit College, Thiruvananthapuram. He had five years of Sanskrit study before joining the college. From Sanskrit College, he passed the Sastry and completed Upadhyaya courses.

== Career ==
Gopala Pillai started his professional career as Headmaster of Sanskrit schools at Perumbuzha (1934) and Panmana (1935). From 1938 to '42, he was the headmaster of Brahmanandodayam Sanskrit School run by Advaithashramam in Kalady. He was also the secretary of the Hindu Youth Service Society which was presided over by Swami Agamananda, social reformer and founder of Advaita Ashram at Kalady. During 1944-'45, he enrolled to military service and traveled across North India.

Later he worked as Malayalam Lexicon Pandit at University of Kerala (1954–61) and as research officer at Oriental Research Institute and Manuscript Library of the University of Kerala at Thiruvananthapuram (1961–71). He served as the president of Malayalam Sahitya Samsat from 1966 to 1972 and worked in Kerala Sahitya Sahakarana Sanghom (1967–70). He was also a member of Kavimandalam.

== Writer ==
Gopala Pillai who was a versatile writer in Malayalam has written books in Sanskrit as well. He had knowledge of Hindi, Bengali, Assamese, Punjabi, Gujarati, and Kannada languages too. His works spanned several genres covering both poetry and prose and covered diverse topics.

Kerala Gauthameeyam is one of the important works in Malayalam on Tarka sastra. Originally published in 1959, it was re-published in 2013 by Kerala Bhasha Institute. "Vidyadhirajan" is the biography of Chattampi Swamikal. "Udayakiranangal" was prescribed as text book for graduate courses of University of Kerala during the 1970s. "Vijayalahari" is a collection of poems celebrating Indian victory in the Indo-Pakistani War of 1971. He has also compiled "Sabdavaijayanthi", a Sanskrit- Malayalam dictionary. A collection of his entire works was published in April 2023.

== Major works ==
Sanskrit

- Dasakumaracharitha Samgraha (1936)
- Sri Sankara Charitham (1936)
- Srikrishna Vijayam (1936)

Malayalam

- Sabdavaijayanthi (Sanskrit-Malayalam Dictionary, 1942)
- Vasantharagini (Poetic Drama, 1945)
- Vidyadhirajan (Biography, 1947)
- Aharavum Krishiyum (Essays on Agriculture, 1951)
- Kerala Gauthameeyam Tharkasastram (1959)
- Udayakiranangal (Essays, 1967)
- Jeevitha Geetha (Poems, 1972)
- Vijayalahari (Poetry, 1972)
- Sameekshanam (Essays, 1972)
- Vijnana Deepam (Essays, 1972)
- Bhashachinthakal (Essays and debates, 2016)

== Awards ==
He was referred by the title 'Kerala Gauthaman' for his contributions in familiarising Tarka sastra in Malayalam. The book "Kerala Gauthameeyam Tharkasastram" was honoured by the Kerala Sahitya Akademi. He was awarded by the Prime Minister of India and Kerala State Government.
