= Saponia =

Croatian chemical and consumer goods company

Saponia d.d
- Type: d.d.
- Traded as: ZSE: SAPN
- ISIN: HRSAPNRA0007
- Industry: Consumer goods
- Founded: 1894
- Founder: Samuel Reinitz
- Headquarters: Osijek, Croatia
- Area served: Worldwide
- Key people: Ivan Grbešić (CEO)
- Products: laundry and cleaning products, beauty care
- Revenue: ▲€132,92 million (2024)
- Number of employees: 725 (2024)
- Website: saponia.hr

Saponia is a Croatian consumer goods and chemical company that produces cleaning and hygiene products, as well as supplements for household and industry. It is headquartered in Osijek.

== History ==
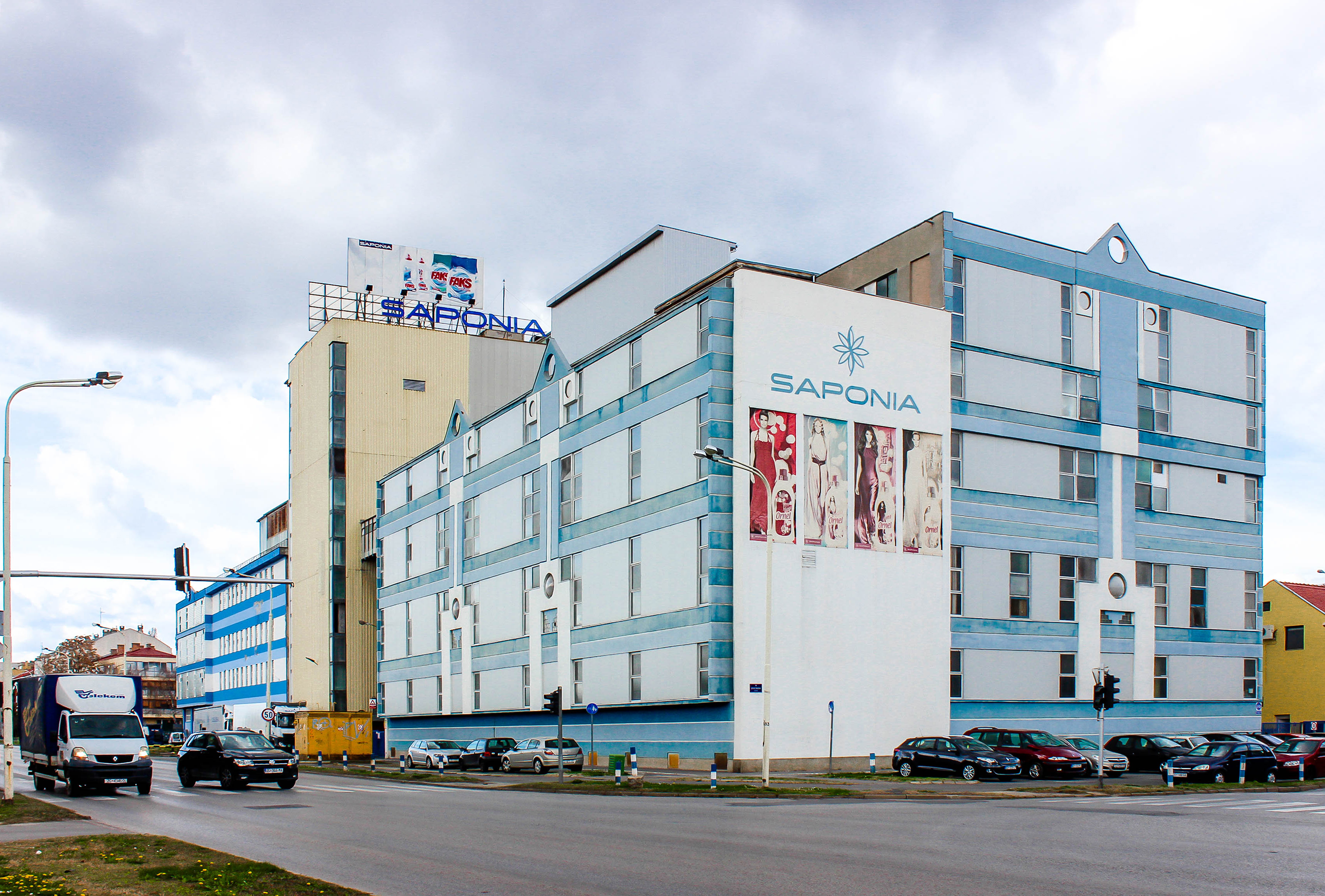
Factory building

The company was initially founded in 1894 by Samuel Reinitz as a factory producing soap, which then connected with another company led by a certain George Schicht in 1922. Croatian Discount Bank was an early investor in Reinitz's business in 1919, during which it operated under the name Prva osječka tvornica sapuna. These companies were subsequently merged in 1930 with the Lever Brothers company from the United Kingdom, while following World War II, they were nationalised and renamed Prva tvornica sapuna Osijek.

In 1952, the company began manufacturing cosmetics, and in the following year it assumes its current name. During the 60s it founded its own research and development institute and began collaborating with Unilever. In the following decades, it increased its production capacities of detergents to 110 thousand tonnes and built new production sites in Nemetin, as well as a distribution centre.

Following the wars during the 90s, it was acquired by Mepas Group from Široki Brijeg in Bosnia and Herzegovina.

== Products ==
- Household products
  - Detergents (Faks Helizim, Rubel, Bioaktiv, Nila, Ornel and Bis)
  - Cleaning products for dishes (Likvi, Tipso, Likvi Automat)
  - Other cleaning products (Vim, Arf, Perin WC)
  - Oral hygiene (Kalodont and toothbrushes)
  - Body care (Frutella, Lahor, Kaina, Brinell, DI Sunprotection)
  - Detergents for laundry (Faks Helizim Aquamarine Hygienic, Rubel Color Fresh, Professional by Faks Helizim)
  - Products for kitchen cleaning
    - Products for machine cleaning of dishes (Blistal Likvid, Blistal Final, Blistal Supreme, Blistal Supreme Plus, Blistal Neutral, Blistal Glass, Blistal Blic, Blistal Primar, Blistal Sol)
    - Other products fo cleaning by hand (Tipso Extra, Blistal DD, Bis C 5404, Bis O 2700, Bis S 0100 DIMAL, Blistal Fit, Bis Dimal Spray, Bis Niro, Bis Kombi 25, Bis K 8015, Bis Dezi-clean)
  - Windows and carpets (Gord, Bis Univerzal, Bis Hygienic, Bis staklo, Bis staklo antistatic, Podin Universal flower, Podin Universal antibacterial, Bis Podex, Podin A, Podin B, Podin Blic, Tepihel)
  - Products for bathrooms (Bis Ekobad, Bis Sanibad Fresh, Bis Duo Active, Bis Sanex, Bis Niro, Perin WC Strong, Bis WC Fresh)
  - Toilet products
    - Liquid soaps (Akval Toalet, Akval Tropic, Akval Dezinid parfimirani, Akval Dezinid neparfimirani, Akval Simplex, Bis Handysept)
  - Technical support and know-how
