= Word chain =

Oral game for a group of people

Word chain (also known as grab on behind, last and first, alpha and omega, and the name game,) is a word game in which players come up with words that begin with the letter or letters that the previous word ended with. A category of words is usually chosen: an example chain for food would be soup, peas, sugar, rice.

The game has a time limit such as five seconds, and words may not be repeated in the same game. The version of the game in which countries, cities, states, rivers, lakes, or capitals are used is called geography, and a generalized version with place names is called atlas.

The game is used as a tool for teaching English as a second language and as a car game.

== Related games ==
A similar Japanese game is shiritori, in which the word must begin with the last mora, or kana, of the previous word. It includes a rule for loss: words ending with N may not be used since the kana is never used in the beginning of words. The game antakshari (ant means end, akshar means letter), played in India, Pakistan and Nepal also involves chaining, but with verses of movie songs (usually Bollywood songs). In Russia, a game similar to the Word chain is called Words (Russian: слова), or "A Game of Cities" (Игра в города) if played using city and town names. In French-speaking countries, the game marabout involves the last syllable.

In Chinese languages, a similar game is known as jielong (接龍), where players start new words with the last hanzi of the preceding word. Another variant of the game is known as tzuchuan (字串), which utilises adding, removing or replacing of one of the character's components to form another character. The most popular variant of the game is known as chengyu jielong (成語接龍), which involves four character idioms instead.

There is also a similar South Slavic game called kalodont, in which players continue the chain by beginning with last two letters of the previous word.

In Korean, a similar game is kkeunmaritgi (끝말잇기), in which players must say a word that starts with the last Hangul letter of the previous word. In Romanian, there is a game called "Fazan" ("Pheasant"), in which players must say a word that starts with the last two letters of the previous word.

Writing poetry following the same principle is called capping verses. Various other variants exist, such as Ancient Greek skolion.

== See also ==
- Generalized geography, a problem in computational complexity theory
