= N. Gopala Pillai =

N.Gopalapillai was a critic and a Sanskrit scholar who wrote in Malayalam and Sanskrit. He was born in Thiruvananthapuram District of Kerala State in India.

== See also ==
- G. Kamalamma, biographer of N. Gopala Pillai
