= Pasur (card game) =

Fishing card game of Persian origin

- Origin: Iran
- Alternative names: Pâsur, Chahâr Barg, Haft Khâj, Haft-o Chahâr: Yâzdah
- Type: Fishing
- Players: 2-4
- Cards: 52
- Deck: Anglo-American
- Rank (high→low): J 10 9 8 7 6 5 4 3 2 A K Q
- Play: Clockwise

Related games
- Bastra • Cassino

Pasur or chahar barg (Persian: پاسور; also spelled Pasour or Pasur) is a fishing card game of Persian origin. Played widely in Iran, it is similar to the Egyptian game of Bastra, and to a lesser extent the Italian games of Cassino and Scopa. Pasur is also known by the names Chahâr Barg (4 cards), Haft Khâj (seven clubs) or Haft Va Chahâr, Yâzdah (7+4=11, the significance being that players want to win 7 clubs in a game of 4-card hands where 11 is a winning number).

== Etymology ==
The name "pasur" entered Persia from the Russian Пacyp during the 19th century along with the playing cards themselves.

== Rules ==
=== Preliminaries ===
One standard pack of 52 cards and 2, 3 or 4 players who take turns being dealer. The object of the game is to get the most points based on winning certain cards.

=== Deal ===
Four cards face-down to each player and four face-up to form the “pool” in the middle of the table. If one of the cards in the pool is a Jack, it gets cut back into the deck and is replaced with a new card, and if this is a Jack as well or if there are multiple Jacks in pool, dealer reshuffles and deals again.

=== Play ===
Beginning at dealer's left, players take turns playing cards to the table until there are no cards left in their hands. Dealer then deals four more cards to each player (but not to the pool) and play continues until the deck is exhausted. A play consists of playing one card in one of two ways:

- Adding it to the pool of face-up cards
- Using that card to pick up one or more cards in the pool.

A player may not add a card to the pool if that card is capable of picking up one or more cards in the pool. The player must pick up the cards or play a different card.

=== Picking up cards ===
Cards may be picked up as follows.

- Number cards (including Aces, which are assigned the numerical value of one) pick up one or more other cards with which they combine to form a sum of eleven. (For example: The pool contains Ace, 2, 2, 4 and 10 in varying suits. A player needs to play a 10 to pick up the ace, a 9 to pick up either one of the twos, an 8 to pick up the Ace and one of the 2's, a 7 to pick up the 4 or both of the 2's, a 6 to pick up the Ace and either the 4 or both 2's, a 5 to pick up the 4 and one of the 2's, a 4 to pick up the 4, a 2 and the Ace, a 3 to pick up the 4 and both 2's, a 2 to pick up the 4, both 2's and the Ace, or an Ace to pick up the 10. The other cards would remain in the pool.)
- A King picks up one King, a Queen picks up one Queen.
- A Jack picks up all Jacks and number cards on the table, but not Kings and Queens.
- When a player only has a single card left in the last hand of the deck, all remaining cards in the pool are picked up when the player is able to match: a) a king-king b) queen-queen c) combine to form a sum of 11. (Basically, on the last hand of the deck, whoever picks up the last card gets to pick up all remaining unmatched cards from the table).

=== Surs ===
A Sur (or Soor) occurs when a player clears all remaining cards from the pool. There are two exceptions:

1. When a Jack is used to pick up all remaining cards from the pool, this is not scored as a Sur.
2. A Sur may not be scored in the last round of play.

Players keep track of their Surs by turning a card face up in their winnings pile.

Note: It is not possible for a Sur to occur when the pips on the cards in the pool total more than ten. It is also impossible to score a Sur when there are multiple face cards or a mix of number cards and face cards in the pool.

=== Scoring ===
Players keep the cards that they pick up face-down in a pile in front of them. The object of the game is to collect the most points, which are tallied by each player once the deck has been exhausted. Scoring varies slightly from place to place, but generally is as follows:

- Most clubs: 7 points (some play 13 points; some play person with the most clubs gets 1 point per club to a maximum of 7 points)
- 10 of diamonds: 3 points
- 2 of clubs: 2 points
- Each Ace: 1 point
- Each Jack: 1 point
- Each Sur: 5 points (some play each Sur as 10 points)

Thus there are a total of 20 available points each round (or 26 if playing 13 points for most clubs), plus a number of 5-point (or 10-point) bonuses for each Sur that occurs. If 3 or 4 people are playing and there is a tie for most clubs, then nobody scores for clubs and the base point total is 13 instead of 20.

=== Ending the game ===
Once the deck has been exhausted and points have been tallied, deal passes to the left and the pack is dealt out anew. Game continues until someone's score is 62 or more points. If players are tied, play continues until the tie is broken.

== Variations ==
=== Pasur Ru Baaz ===
Pasur Ru Baaz (Persian : پاسور رو باز, literally "Open Pasur") is a variant identical to a 2-player game of Pasur, the only difference being that one card in each player's hand is always kept face-up on the table, making it visible to both players. Players may play any of their own open cards, the card beneath the played card, which was previously hidden from both players, is then turned over (becomes visible to both players).

=== Three Players ===
This three-player variant follows the rules for the standard game, with one variation in scoring for clubs.: If two players tie for having the same number of clubs, then it is the third player who scores 7 points for clubs, even though they have fewer clubs than the other players.

== See also ==
- Bastra
- Cassino (card game)
- Escoba
- Scopa
