= Choub bazi =

Choub bazi, choob or choobazi (Persian: چوب بازی) is one of Iranian games and traditions with an ancient history that goes back to ancient Iran. This traditional ritual is also mentioned in Ferdowsi's Shahnameh. In Iran, there are two authentic types of stick games. One is the Sistani stick game, which is popular in the eastern half of Iran. The other is the Lori, which is more popular in the southern and western parts of the country.

== Etymology ==
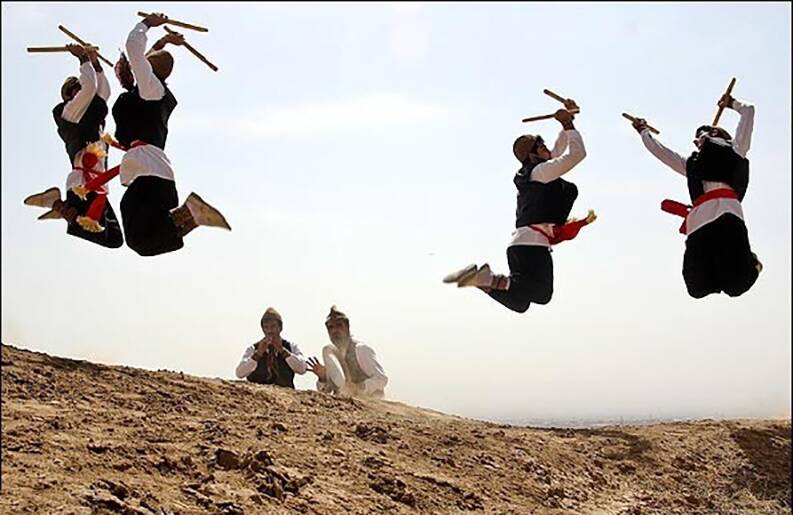
Choob Bazi/Dance (Sabzevar, Khorasan)

What is known today as Choub Bazi is the continuation of the sword dance, which the ancient Iranians, the troops of Khorasan, in particular. used to strengthen and maintain the morale and defense readiness of their forces in peacetime. Also, this dance has similarities with Chapi dance. The sword dance, which begins with a kind of spiritual dance and Sama's rotation (ritual dance), is basically the same rotation around the axis of existence that is mentioned in the philosophy of Sama's dances. The hands facing the sky and regular rotations each have their own meanings.

== Sword Dance ==
Sword dance has been one of the most original Aryan dances, or the Great Sistan and Khorasan, and has been preserved in this region for a long time. What is known today as Choub bazi is the continuation of the sword dance, which the ancient Iranians used to strengthen their morale and defensive readiness with this sword dance to continue their defense preparation in peacetime. The sword dance begins with a kind of spiritual dance and Samai rotation. This type of dance is popular in Sabzevar and Torbat-e-Jam. Another similar type of dance in Sabzevar is called Asb-e-Choobi (wooden horse) roots back in Mongol's time when Iranian could not carry swords. People used this type of dance to practice fighting while pretending to have a party. In Asb-e-Choobi dance there is a black horse with whom the dancers fight.

== See also ==
- Iranian dance
