= Doggerel =

Poetry with poor rhythm and rhyme

Doggerel, or doggrel, is poetry that is irregular in rhythm and in rhyme, often deliberately for burlesque or comic effect. Alternatively, it can mean verse which has a monotonous rhythm, easy rhyme, and cheap or trivial meaning.

The word is derived from the Middle English dogerel, probably a derivative of dog. In English, it has been used as an adjective since the 14th century and a noun since at least 1630.

Appearing since ancient times in the literatures of many cultures, doggerel is characteristic of nursery rhymes and children's song.

== Examples ==
The Scottish poet William McGonagall (1825–1902) has become famous for his doggerel,, as in his poem "The Tay Bridge Disaster":

Oh! Ill-fated bridge of the silv'ry Tay,
I now must conclude my lay
By telling the world fearlessly without the least dismay,
That your central girders would not have given way,
At least many sensible men do say,
Had they been supported on each side with buttresses,
At least many sensible men confesses,
For the stronger we our houses do build,
The less chance we have of being killed.

Hip hop lyrics have also explored the artful possibilities of doggerel.

Chaucer's Tale of Sir Thopas is written in this format. It irritates the Host of The Tabard so much that he interrupts him and makes him tell a different tale.

== See also ==
- Accentual verse
- Crambo
- Knittelvers
- Nonsense poetry
- Poetaster
