= Bastra =

Fishing card game

Basra
- Origin: Egypt
- Type: Fishing
- Players: 2-4
- Cards: 52
- Deck: Anglo-American
- Rank (high→low): K Q J 10 9 8 7 6 5 4 3 2 A
- Play: Clockwise

Related games
- Cassino • Pasur • Pişti

Basra is a fishing card game, similar to cassino, and popular in Cyprus. The game is also popular in Egypt, Lebanon, and other Middle Eastern countries. The name is Greek borrowing from the Arabic word Basra. Turkish pişti or pişpirik consists a particular evolution of Basra.

== History ==
The game originated in Greece and is known in different variations such as diloti and kseri. The game has been exported by both the Cypriot and Turkish diasporas, and it is played in Cypriot communities in Australia, Canada, England, and the United States, usually passed on by the first generation of immigrants to their children and grandchildren. In Turkey, the game is still very popular.

== The game ==
The game is played with a 52 card deck and can involve two, three, or four players, although the game is most interesting in the two or four player versions. In the four player version, the players can play for themselves or in two player teams. The first team or player to score 100 points is the winner.

=== The play ===
The dealer starts by dealing 1 card to each player, starting with the player on the dealer's left, until each player has 4 cards. The dealer then places 4 cards in the middle of the table, called the board. If 1 or more of the 4 cards is a jack, the dealer returns the jack(s) to the bottom of the deck and replaces it or them with the next card(s) from the top of the deck. The play begins with the player to the dealer's left, until all cards are played out. The players either collect (fish) cards from the board or add a card to the board, if they cannot fish any cards. After the cards are exhausted, the dealer then deals each player 4 more cards from the remaining deck. The dealer, however, does not deal 4 cards onto the board as done for the opening hand. The hands are played out until there are no remaining cards to be dealt.

In the two player version, each round has six hands. In the three player version, each round has four hands. In the four player version, each round consists of three hands.

=== Scoring ===
The scoring is as follows:

- The aces, which have a numeral value of 1, are worth 1 point each.
- The jacks are worth 1 point each.
- The two of clubs is worth 2 points.
- The ten of diamonds is worth 3 points.
- The player or team that collects the most cards in a given hand receives 3 points. In the event of a tie, each player or team receives 3 points.
- The player or team that collects all the cards in play without benefit of a jack receives 10 points, or a bastra.

=== Collecting cards ===
The object of the game is to collect total cards and cards that are worth various points. Cards are collected as follows:

- Pairing: Any card may be used to take another card or cards of the same denomination, i.e. a 7 takes a 7, a king takes a king, a 6 takes two 6s, etc.
- Combining: Multiple cards may be collected through adding the numeral value of the cards together. For example, the board shows 2, an ace, 5 and 4. A player with a 3 could take 2 and the ace (2+1=3), or a player holding a 9 could take 5 and 4 (5+4=9), or a player holding a 7 could take 2, the ace and 4 (2+1+4=7).
  - A player may also collect combinations of the same sum. For example, if the board shows 5, 4, 2 and 7, a 9 would take all 4 cards, i.e. 5+4 and 2+7=9 (this would also be a Bastra).
- Pairing and combining: Taking cards through pairing and combining can occur on the same play. For example, if the board showed 3 6 5 4 and 9, a 9 would take all the cards, i.e. 3+6 and 5+4=9, plus the 9 would be paired with the 9 (this would also be a Bastra).

On the last hand, there are often uncollected cards left on the board. These cards are awarded to the last player or team to collect a card.

=== Jack ===
The jack is the most powerful card because it can collect all the cards on the board. However, if a jack is played onto an empty board, it is lost and remains in play until one of the players can collect it, usually with another jack. In some versions of the game, (notably in the online card game platform Jawaker) the seven of diamonds does the same thing.

=== Basra ===
The basra is the most important scoring play of the game since it is worth 10 points. A basra occurs when a player succeeds in clearing the board without benefit of a jack. For example, if the board shows just a 7 and a player collects it with another 7, that player or team receives 10 points. In another scenario, if the board shows 3 and 2 and a player collects them with a 5, that player or team also receives 10 points. In the rare event that a jack takes a solitary jack, no basra is awarded.

=== Placement of collected cards ===
The players place the collected cards close to their position at the table. To record bastras, the player places the bastra card face up, sticking out of the player's pile of collected cards. The dealer should be careful to place his or her collected cards away from the deck, so as to avoid confusion. Players are not allowed to look at their collected cards until the end of the hand. At the end of the hand, the players count their total cards and points.

=== End of game ===
The game ends when one player or team reaches 100 points. In the rare event of a tie (2 players or teams finish even beyond the 100 point mark) there are various tie-breaking options, determined by the players by mutual consent. The game can be declared a draw, or an extra hand or hands can be played until the tie is broken. Or the players can extend the game to a fixed number of points (20, 30 or 50).

== Related games ==
=== Egyptian basra ===
The Egyptian fishing game, basra, has the same rules of bastra with the following differences:

- Scoring: The player or team that collects the most cards in a given hand receives 30 points. In the event of a tie, each having 26 cards, bonus points are cancelled and the initial 30 points are held in abeyance and added to the 30 points of the next round, this is repeated for each tie until the tie is broken.
- Powerful card: The 7 of diamonds is the second most powerful card because it can collect all the cards on the board. If the cards on the floor are all numerals, and their values add up to 10 or less, this counts as a basra, and scores the 10 point bonus. If the floor adds up to more than ten, or includes picture cards, the 7 of diamonds still takes all the cards but it does not count as a basra. However, if a 7 of diamonds is played onto an empty board, it is lost and remains in play until one of the players can collect it, usually with another 7.
- Basra: A double basra is awarded (20 points) when a jack takes a solitary jack. In some variations, a double basra is awarded (30 points).
- End of game: The game ends when one player or team reaches 101 or 121 points depending on agreement between players. If both players reach 101 or 121 in the same round, the player with the higher score wins. In case of a tie, additional rounds are played until the tie is broken.

=== Yemeni basra ===
Yemeni basra has the same rules of the Egyptian basra with the following differences:

- Powerful card: The 7 of diamonds is the second most powerful card because it can collect all the cards on the board. When the seven of diamonds is played, it counts as a basra in the following cases:
  - The total value of the cards on the floor is less than 10 (not if it is equal to 10).
  - The only card(s) on the floor are tens, queens and kings.
  - The cards on the floor can be divided into two or more groups which score an equal number of points, less than 10. For example, capturing A-2-7-8 with the diamond 7 would be a basra, because (1+8)=(2+7)=9. However, if a 7 of diamonds is played onto an empty board, it is lost and remains in play until one of the players can collect it, usually with another 7.
- Basra: A double basra is awarded (20 points) when a jack takes a solitary jack.
- End of game: The game ends when one player or team reaches 101 points or 121 depending on the agreement between players. If both players reach 101 or 121 in the same round, the player with the higher score wins. In case of a tie, additional rounds are played until the tie is broken.

=== Ethiopian basra ===
Ethiopian basra has the same rules as Egyptian basra with the following differences:

- Scoring: The player or team that collects the most cards in a given hand receives 3 points. In the event of a tie where each team has 26 cards, no one gets 3 points. The game continues until the tie is broken.
- Basra: In the case of numerals equal to or below 10, numeral combining (grouping) is allowed as long as picture cards are not in the floor. For example capturing 10-4-6 OR A-2-7-8 with the 7 diamonds would be a basra since (10)=(4+6)=10 or (1+8)=(2+7)=9. The prince/jack card is impossible to basra (and also a jack can not do a basra on another jack). If the komai (seven of diamonds) is left alone on the table, then any card except the jack can do on it Basra.
- End of game: The game ends when one player or team reaches 52. If both players reach 52 in the same round, the player with the higher score wins. In case of a tie, additional rounds are played until the tie is broken.

=== Lebanese basra ===
Lebanese basra has two variants. It has the same rules of bastra with the following differences:

==== Variant A ====
- Play: Six cards are usually dealt to each player.
- Scoring: If there is a tie, each team having 26 cards, no one gets 3 points.
- Basra: In this variant, a basra occurs only when:
  - a single card is left alone on the table – either because all the other cards were captured, or because the table was cleared (perhaps with a jack), forcing the next player to play a single card. If the following player can match this single card (thereby capturing it), this counts as a basra and scores 10 points. Capturing a lone card other than a jack by playing a jack does not count as a basra; capturing a lone jack with another jack counts as an ordinary single basra, not a double one.
  - There is a single card alone on the table, the next player plays a card that does not capture it, and the following player is able to clear the table by playing a card equal to the sum of these two cards. For example, the table contains a lone 3. The next player plays a 4 (perhaps having no other card). If the following player can play a 7, capturing the 3 + 4, this is a basra, worth 10 points.
- End of game: Whichever team reaches a score of 101 points first wins the game. If both players reach 101 in the same round, the player with the higher score wins. In the case of a tie, additional rounds are played until the tie is broken.

==== Ashush ====
- Play: In the Ashush variant, six or four cards are usually dealt to each player, depending on agreement between players.
- Scoring: If there is a tie, each team having 26 cards, no one gets 3 points.
- Basra: In this variation, a basra occurs only when a single card is left alone on the table – either because all the other cards were captured, or because the table was cleared (perhaps with a jack), forcing the next player to play a single card. If the following player can match this single card (thereby capturing it), this counts as a basra and scores 10 points. Capturing a lone card other than a jack by playing a jack does not count as a basra; capturing a lone jack with another jack counts as an ordinary single basra, not a double one.
- End of game: Whichever team reaches a score of 101 points first wins the game. If both players reach 101 in the same round, the player with the higher score wins. In case of a tie, additional rounds are played until the tie is broken.

=== Palestinian Basra ===
A version of Basra is played in Palestine and Jordan. It has the same rules of Bastra with these differences:

There are only 44 cards in the card deck. Kings and Queens cards are usually thrown out. 4 cards are usually dealt to each player although there is a variation where 5 cards are dealt

If there is a tie, each team having 26 cards, no one gets 3 points.

In this version of Basra, the score for a Basra is twice the face value of the card used to make the capture. For example, a Basra with a 7 scores 14 points in the case of capturing a 7 Spades with a 7 Diamonds. If a player captures a Jack with a lone Jack, there is no Basra.

The game ends when one player or team reaches 101 or 151 depending on agreement between players.

=== Jordanian Basra ===
In Jordan, there are two variants of Basra.

One is the same as Palestinian Basra. It should be born in mind that the Palestinian Basra is the most dominant Basra variant in Jordan.

The other version is reported by Muthana Haddad. This variant of Jordanian Basra is the same as Palestinian Basra except that the picture cards, Queens and Kings, are used and the value of these cards differs as well. If the picture cards, Queens and Kings are used, they count as 10 for this purpose, so if a Queen captures a lone Queen from the table the score will be 20 points.

=== Syrian Basra ===
In Syria, there is more than one variant of Basra.

One is similar to the Palestinian Basra with the following differences:

- There are only 52 cards in the card deck. Kings and Queens cards are not thrown out. 4 or 6 cards are usually dealt to each player.
- The value of a Queen is 3 points, so if a player captures a queen with another queen, they acquire double points, that is 6 points.

The value of a King is 4 points, so if a player captures a king with another king, they acquire double points, that is 8 points. Capturing a Jack with a Jack is scored as follows:- The value of a Jack is 12.5, so if a player capture a Jack with another Jack, they acquire 25 points.

Another variant in Syria is called Homsi Basra. It is similar to the Palestinian Basra except that the value of a Jack is 12.5, so if a player captures a Jack with another Jack, they acquire 25 points.

=== Piro ===
Also known as Pirra. Played in Uzbekistan and possibly in Afghanistan and Iran.

For two players, with each game consisting of two rounds. Played with a standard 52 card French style deck with jokers removed. Each player is dealt 5 cards face-down and two cards are dealt face-up in the middle. The player who is not the dealer chooses a card (or cards) from their hand to match the value of one of the face-up cards. Face cards (Jack, Queen, King) can only match their corresponding card. Two or more cards may be combined to match a value. For instance, if a face card is an 8, two fours or a 6 and a 2 may be used to capture it. When a card is captured it and the cards used for capture are set to the side of the player that captured the card.

Only one card may be captured, so if both cards are a 5 then one or the other must be chosen. If a player cannot capture either of the two cards then they must lay a card face-up to join the others. Playing a card is not required. Play continues back and forth until the entire deck has been depleted. At that point scores are tallied and the second round begins, with the other person playing as the dealer this time. Any cards still face-up stay for the next round. At the end of the final (second) round, the last person to match a face-up card keeps all of the face up cards left over.

- Scoring: Scoring takes place after each round, with the winner of the game being the person that scores 11 or more points after both rounds have been played. The player with the most cards gets a point. If both players have the same amount of cards then they each get one point. The player with the most clubs gains an additional point. The first player to reach 11 points after a round wins the game.
- Powerful cards: The two of clubs and the ten of diamonds are each worth an additional point to the player that possesses them after a round is finished.

== See also ==
- Cassino (card game)
- Escoba
- Scopa
- Pasur (card game)
