= Antakshari =

Parlor game in India

Antakshari, also known as Antyakshari (अंताक्षरी transl. The game of the ending letter) is a spoken parlor game played in India. Each contestant sings the first verse of a song (often Classical Hindustani or Bollywood songs) that begins with the consonant of Hindi alphabet on which the previous contestant's song ended.

== Etymology ==
The word is derived from two Sanskrit words: antya (अन्त्य) meaning end + akshara (अक्षर) meaning letter of the alphabet. With the addition of the suffix 'i', the combined term means "The game of the ending letter". Due to schwa syncope in Hindi and other Indo-Aryan languages, Antyakshari is pronounced antakshri. A dialectical variation of the word is इन्ताक्षरी or intakshri.

== Origin ==
Antakshari was originally present in the Ramayana, where rishis (sages) sang the first verses of bhajanas continuously by singing another Bhajana beginning with the last letter of the ending word.

== Rules ==
The game can be played by two or more people and is popular as a group activity during commutes, and social gatherings. The first singer has to sing two complete lines and then s/he may stop at the end of those or following lines. The last letter of the last word sung is then used by the next singer to sing another song, starting with that letter. The winner or winning team is decided by a process of elimination. The person or team that cannot come up with a song with the right consonant is eliminated if their opponents can produce such a song.

The game is often kicked off with the consonant /m/ (म ) with the recitation of the following couplet which varies, but usually has wording similar to -

बैठे बैठे क्या करे? करना है कुछ काम,

शुरू करो अंताक्षरी, लेके प्रभु का नाम!

Baiṭhē, baiṭhē, kya karē? Karnā hai kuch kām,
Shurū karō antākshari, lēkē Prabhu ka nām!

Sitting here all bored, whatever shall we do?

Take the name of the Lord and start a game of Antākshari!

- This means that the first song must start with (m).
- Songs have to be started from the last sound of the previous song.
- Only songs from Hindustani classical music or Bollywood movies are allowed by default. Songs from other languages can be allowed with prior agreement.
- At least the first verse of the song must be sung. If the singer does not remember it in entirety, they cannot use the song.
- No song can be repeated in the game.

== Popularity ==
The original start of this practice was from Srilankan Tamil Radio., further followed by Bombay based Radio and TV anchors. It started as a family pastime. Now there are several TV shows and competitions all over India based on it. The classic style is where two or more teams sing songs which start with the last consonant letter of the song sung by previous team. When a team sings a song they earn points.

A popular Indian television program by the same name has run successfully on Zee TV for over 10 years. Annu Kapoor was the permanent male host while female hosts included Durga Jasraj, Renuka Shahane, Pallavi Joshi, Shefali, Rajeshwari Sachdev & Richa Sharma.

== Example ==
आ चल के तुझे, मैं ले के चलूं, इक ऐसे गगन के तले
जहां ग़म भी न हो, आँसू भी न हो, बस प्यार ही प्यार पले
(Movie: Door Gagan Ki Chhaon Mein)

This song ends with ले (le), i.e. the consonant /l/ ल. The next contestant could sing -

लग जा गले कि फिर ये हसीन रात हो न हो
शायद फिर इस जनम में मुलाक़ात हो न हो
(Movie: Woh Kaun Thi)

=== Example ===
Kehne ko jashn-e-bahaaraa hai,
Ishq yeh dekh ke hairaan hai,
Phool se khushboo khafa khafa hai gulshan mein,
Chupa hai koi ranj fiza ki chilman mein.
(Movie: Jodhaa Akbar)

The next song should begin with /m/ (the 'n' in mein is only a nasalization rather than a complete consonant, similar to bon/good in French):

Mai zindagi ka saath nibhata chala gaya, Har fiqr ko dhuen mein uraata chala gaya,
Barbadiyon ka sog manana fizool tha, Barbadiyon ka jashn manata chala gaya.
(Movie: Hum Dono (1961 film))

The next song should begin with (y) and so on.

== Related games ==
Bait Bazi is a related game played with Urdu poetry instead of movie songs. Several word chain games also resemble antakshari in their basic methodology. Antakshari's basic methodology resembles that of several word chain games.

== See also ==
- Antakshari – The Great Challenge
- Antakshari Intercollegiate Championship
- Bait Bazi
- Baas-o-Beyt
- Bollywood songs
- Zee Tv's Antakshari
