= Crambo =

Rhyming game

Crambo is a rhyming game which, according to Joseph Strutt, was played as early as the 14th century under the name of the ABC of Aristotle. It is also known as capping the rhyme. The name may also be used to describe a doggerel poem which exhausts the possible rhymes with a particular word.

In the days of the Stuarts it was very popular, and is frequently mentioned in the writings of the time. Thus William Congreve's 1695 play Love for Love, i. 1, contains the passage,

"Get the Maids to Crambo in an Evening, and learn the knack of Rhyming."

== Etymology ==
The name comes from the Latin crambe and Greek κράμβη krámbē, meaning "cabbage" (as in crambe repetita (Juvenal, satire 7, 154), literally meaning "re-stewed cabbage"). Hence the players started with a rhyme and then "re-stewed" it.

== Play ==
In the early versions of the game up to the eighteenth century, teams would vie with each other to find and express a rhyme for a word or line presented by the opposing player or team. Someone would offer the first rhyme often poking fun at a dignitary; the subsequent lines or couplets would then have to rhyme with this. The verse would be sung to a popular tune of the day and the game collapsed when a player was unable to use his wit to come up with a suitable rhyming word.

Crambo in the nineteenth century became a word game in which one player would think of a word and tell the others what it rhymes with. The others do not name the actual word they guess, but describe its meaning. Thus one might say, "I know a word that rhymes with bird." A second asks, "Is it ridiculous?" "No, it is not absurd." "Is it a group of cows?" "No, it is not a herd." This proceeds until the right word is guessed.

== Dumb crambo ==
In dumb crambo the guessers, instead of trying to name the rhyme being given them as a clue, express its meaning by acting the word without speaking in the manner of charades.

== Notable players ==
Samuel Pepys recorded playing in his diary entry of Saturday 19 May 1660: "From thence to the Hague again playing at crambo in the waggon, Mr. Edward, Mr. Ibbott, W. Howe, Mr. Pinkney, and I."

One of Crambo's more famous devotees, Robert Burns (1759–1796), wrote: "Amaist as soon as I could spell, / I to the crambo-jingle fell."

James Boswell (1740–1795) was famous for his skill at the game. One crambo poem from Boswell is rhymed around "the Laird of Craigubble", a fellow Crambo player. One of the stanzas goes:

"To render you bright with choice liquor at night / Take Punch made of rum that is double / And I give you this charge be your Bowl full & large / To content the good Laird of Craigubble."

Each stanza in the poem has the rhyme scheme ABCB, and every stanza ends with "the Laird of Craigubble".

Karl Marx (1818–1883) was a frequent dumb crambo player with his wife and daughters in their North London home.
