= Sistani dialect =

Dialect continuum of the Persian language

Sistani Persian
- Sistuni Persian
- سیستونی; Sistuni
- Pronunciation: Pārsi-e Sistāni, Pārsi-e Sistuni
- Native to: Iran
- Region: Sistan and Baluchestan Province
- Ethnicity: Sistani Persians
- Language family: Indo-European: Indo-Iranian; Iranic; Western Iranic; Southwestern Iranic; Persian; Western Persian; Sistani Persian

Language codes
- ISO 639-3: None (mis)
- Glottolog: sist1235

Sistani (Persian: سیستانی, also known as Sistuni (سیستونی) is a dialect continuum of the Persian language spoken by Sistani people in Iranian Sistan. It is part of the Southwestern Iranian branch of the Indo-Iranian group of Indo-European languages.

== Sistani phrases ==
English	Sistani	Transliteration
What's up?	چکاره؟	chkāra?
Why?	ورچه؟	varche?
What?	چزه؟	cheze?
Where?	اگجه؟	agja?
Come in.	در شو	dar sho.
Are you serious? (literally "Do you swear to God?")	تره والله؟	tra vallā?
How many times?	چن لئ؟	chen le'?
It's gonna be late.	إره مئ شو	e'ra me'sho.
I love you.	دل مه بالئ تره	del me bāle' tra.
Sistani is a good language.	سیستونی گپّ زبریه	sistoni gappe zabria.

== Comparison between Sistani dialect of Persian and Balochi language ==
English	Sistani	Balochi
dust	palg	polg
perfect	purra	pura
kiss	pakk	pakko
finger	chongol	changol
notice	sarpe'	sarpad
scorpion	qa'zum	zum
excursion	chaqal	chakar
stupid	ga'nok	ganok
wrinkle	krenj	gerenchag

== Sistani words ==
Sistani	Balochi	English equivalent
plaft	molir	withered
spest	espost	alfalfa
shpul	shul	whistle
kneshk	bòzahr	frown
chrokh	ròk	shiny
kutru	golloď	puppy
chilāsk	calàsk	skinny
jangara		aggressive
dajg	ťayi	tie

== See also ==
- Baas-o-Beyt
- Gholamali Raisozzakerin

== Sources ==
- "The Status of [h] and [ʔ] in the Sistani Dialect of Miyankangi". Carina Jahani, Farideh Okati, Abbas Ali Ahangar. Iranian Journal of Applied Language Studies, 1:1 (2009), pp. 80–99.
- "Natural Phonological Processes in Sistani Persian of Iran". Okati, Farideh, Ahangar, Abbas Ali, Anonby, Erik, Jahani, Carina. Iranian Journal of Applied Language Studies, 2:1, (2010), pp. 93–120.
- Lazard, Gilbert (1974). “Morphologie du verbe dans le parler persan du Sistan”, in Studia Iranica 3.
