= Haide Klüglein =

German swimmer

Personal information
- Born: February 9, 1939 Magdeburg, Germany
- Died: July 28, 2020 (aged 81) Flensburg, Germany

Sport
- Sport: Swimming
- Club: Flensburger Schwimmklub

Haide Klüglein (February 2, 1939 – July 28, 2020) was a female German swimmer, who is starting for the Flensburger Schwimmklub (Flensburg swimming club).

The holder of multiple swimming-records in Schleswig-Holstein (as of 2014), German Champion (in 2011 and in 2013 over 2,5 kilometres open water swimming) and German Vicechampion (in 2005 over 400 and 800 metres freestyle swimming) as well as eight times World Championship-competitor (as of 2014) reached her biggest successes on long distances in open water swimming of the Masters, which Klüglein usually completes with two short distances. Before every competition in open water, Klüglein checks the official given water temperature by her own thermometer – the German Swimming Federation dictates in general at German Championships at least 16 °C.

For her success awarded the council of Flensburg Haide Klüglein in 2009 with the medal of honour in Bronze. Klüglein died in 2020 aged 81 in Flensburg.

== Best results (selection) ==
=== Best results ===
Best results
Year	Competition	Place	Kind of sport	Result	Time
2005	German Championships of Masters	Cologne/Germany	400 m freestyle (age class 65)	2nd place
2005	German Championships of Masters	Cologne/Germany	800 m freestyle (age class 65)	2nd place
2009	German Championships in Open Water Swimming 2009	Lindau/Germany	5 km Open Water Swimming (age class70)
2009	International German Championships of Masters "Long distances"	Uelzen/Germany	400 m freestyle (age class 70)	3rd place	8:37,39
2009	International German Championships of Masters "Long distances"	Uelzen/Germany	800 m freestyle (age class 70)	3rd place	17:24,91
2010	13th FINA World Masters Championships	Gothenburg/Sweden	50 m backstroke (age class 70)	9th place	0:52,97
2010	13th FINA World Masters Championships	Gothenburg/Sweden	50 m breaststroke (age class 70)	13th place	0:55,88
2011	International German Championships in Open Water Swimming 2011	Rostock/Germany	2,5 km Open Water swimming (age class 70)	1st place	1:09:19,54
2012	14th FINA World Masters Championships	Riccione/Italy	50 m breaststroke (age class 70)	15th place	0:54,67
2012	14th FINA World Masters Championships	Riccione/Italy	50 m backstroke (age class 70)	14th place	0:53,43
2012	14th FINA World Masters Championships	Riccione/Italy	3 km Open water swimming (age class 70)	12th place	58:20,5
2013	German championships in Open Water swimming 2013	Duisburg/Germany	2,5 km Open Water swimming (age class 70)	1st place	1:09,56,34
2013	14th Arena European Masters Championships 2013/Open Water	Eindhoven/Netherlands	3 km Open water swimming (age class 70)	4th place	1:25:00.00
2014	15th FINA World Masters Championships	Montreal/Canada	50 m breaststroke (age class 75)	7th place	0:56,89
2014	15th FINA World Masters Championships	Montreal/Canada	50 m backstroke (age class 75)	7th place	0:56,18
2014	15th FINA World Masters Championships	Montreal/Canada	3 km Open water swimming (age class 75)	7th Platz	1:04:33,70

=== Records ===
Records
Year	Record	Sport	Time
2004	Record in Schleswig-Holstein	400 m freestyle, short course (25 m), age class 65	7:34,82
2005	Record in Schleswig-Holstein	1500 m freestyle, short course (25 m), age class 65	30:02,79
2007	Record in Schleswig-Holstein	5000 m freestyle, age class 65	1:56:03,63
2010	Record in Schleswig-Holstein	5000 m freestyle, age class 70	2:06:30,35
