= Nordertor =

Town gate in Flensburg, Germany

Coordinates: 54°47′43.504″N 9°25′48.175″E

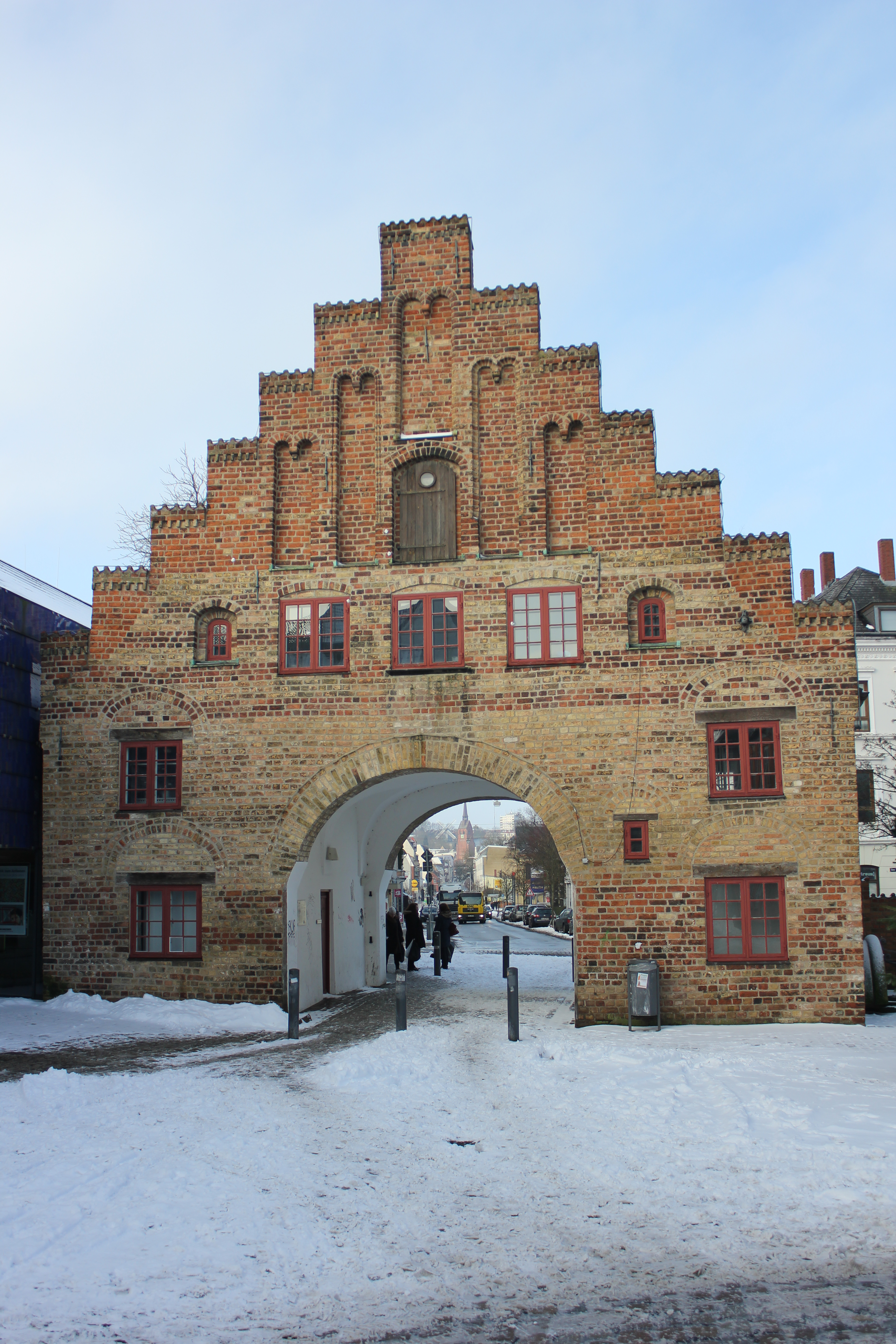
The Nordertor in winter

The Nordertor (Danish: Nørreport) is an old town gate in Flensburg, Germany, which was built around 1595. Today the landmark is used as a symbol for Flensburg.

== History ==
The town wall of Flensburg was built step by step from 1345 onwards. A town gate, named Norder Porte, was built in the northern section of the wall. At the end of the 16th century, it was replaced by the Nordertor, a building with stepped gables and archway. At this time the Nordertor marked the northern boundary of the town. It was a checkpoint that was closed at night.

On the north face of the gate are two plaques. The left one bears the royal coat of arms of King Christian IV, 1577-1648 and the Latin words: Regna Firmat Pietas — Piety strengthens the Realm. The right one bears the coat of arms of Flensburg with the German words: Friede ernährt, Unfrieden verzehrt — Peace nurtures, strife devours. Also to be seen is the date of renovation, inscribed as "Renov. 1767". The town gate was restored in the time of Christian VII, 1749-1808. The left plaque is most likely the older of the two, possibly from the time when the Nordertor was built.

In 1796 a ban on building outside the town walls ended, and the town began to expand beyond. The suburb of Neustadt (Danish: Nystaden, meaning Newtown) was built in the neighborhood of the Nordertor. In 1913/14 the gate was restored by the architect Paul Ziegler, and a clock was installed. In 1966 the Deutsche Bundespost issued a 30 Pfennig stamp with the gate's image. Over 3 billion of these stamps for letter post were sold. In the 1990s the gate was again restored and the clock was removed. In 2004 the gate was licensed as a venue for civil weddings, so that weddings are now performed in a room above the archway of the gate.

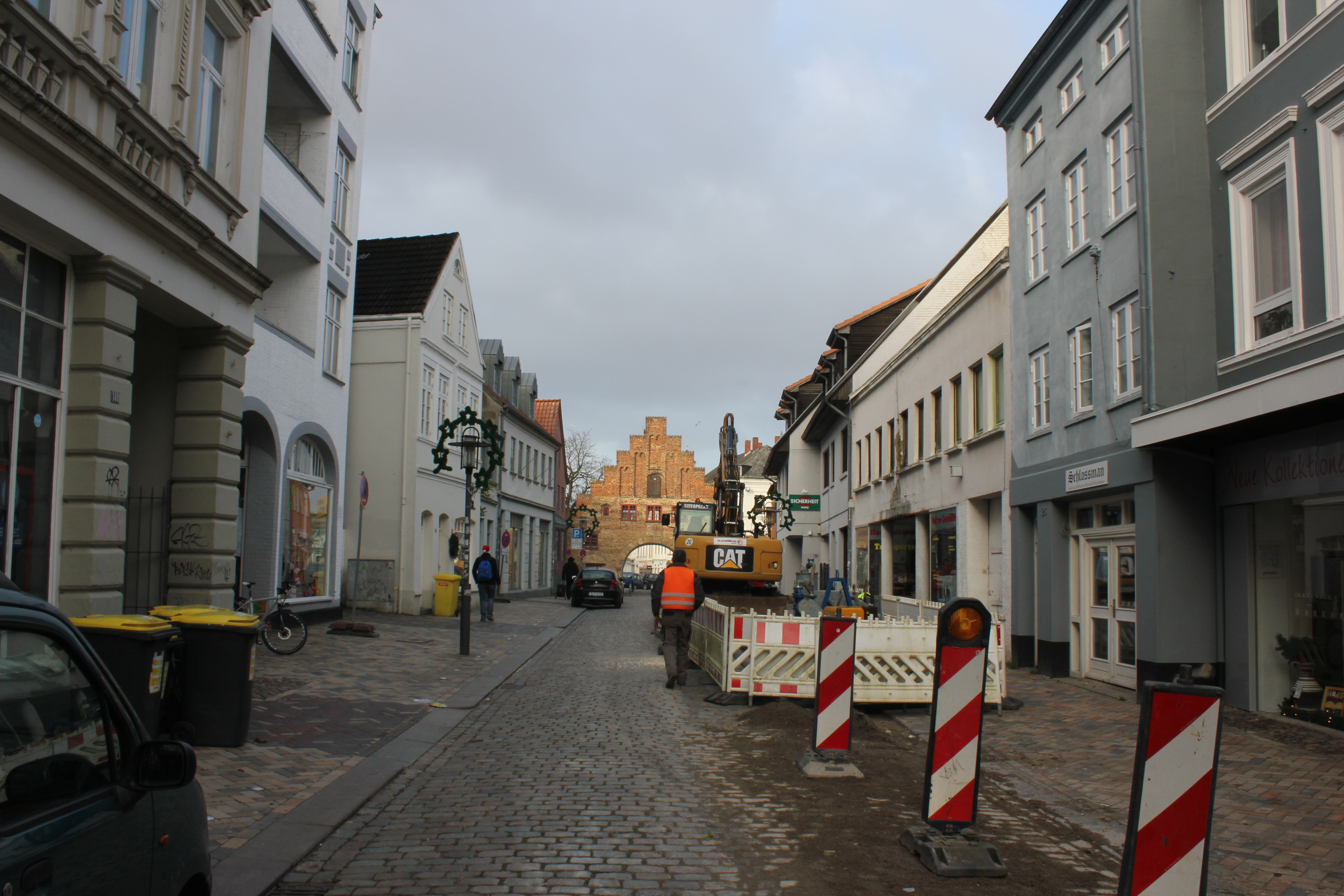
View from the original site of the Norder Porte to the Nordertor today

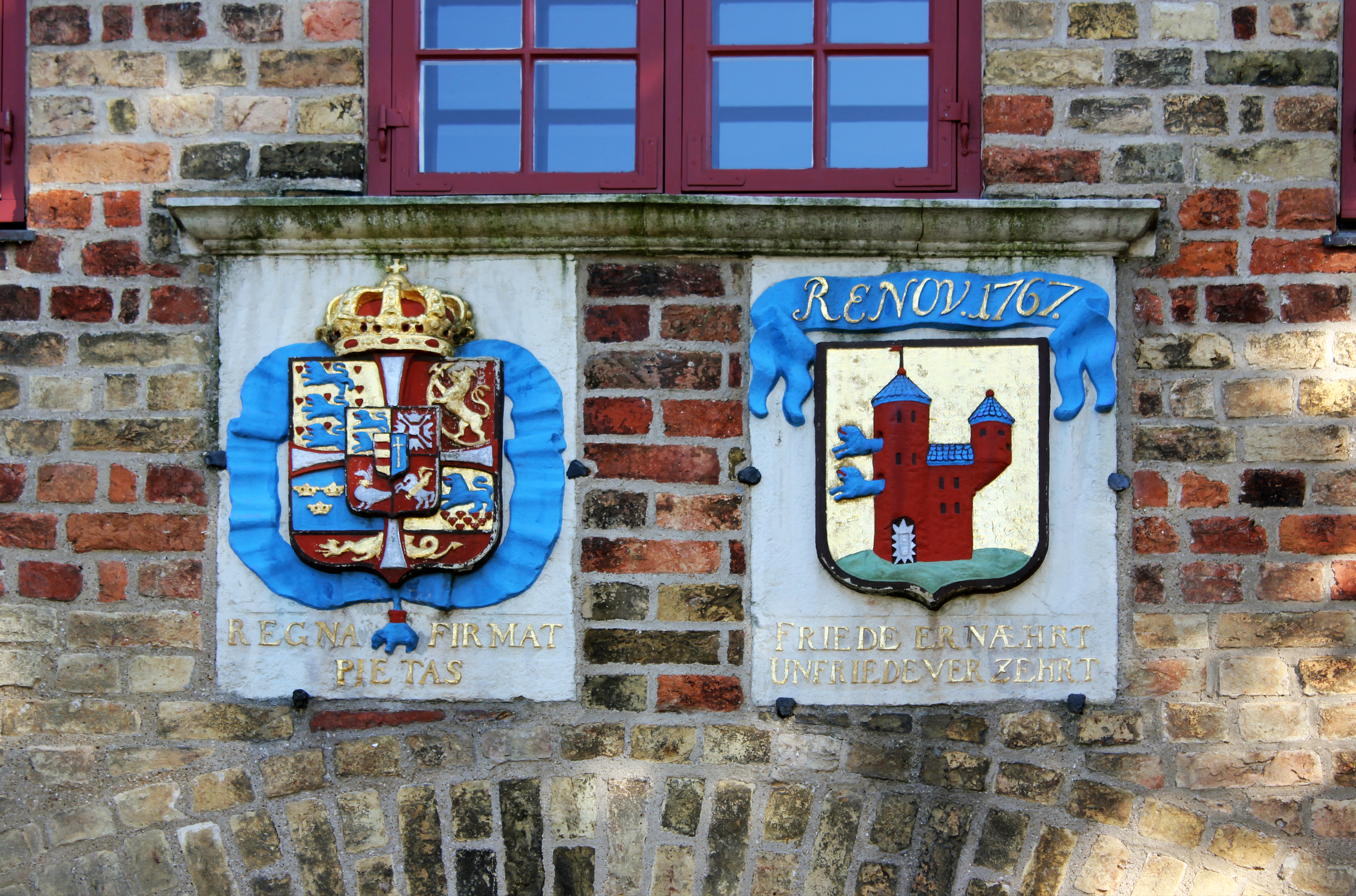
The coats of arms and the mottos (left: REGNA FIRMAT PIETAS; right: FRIEDE ERNæHRT UNFRIEDEVER ZEHRT)

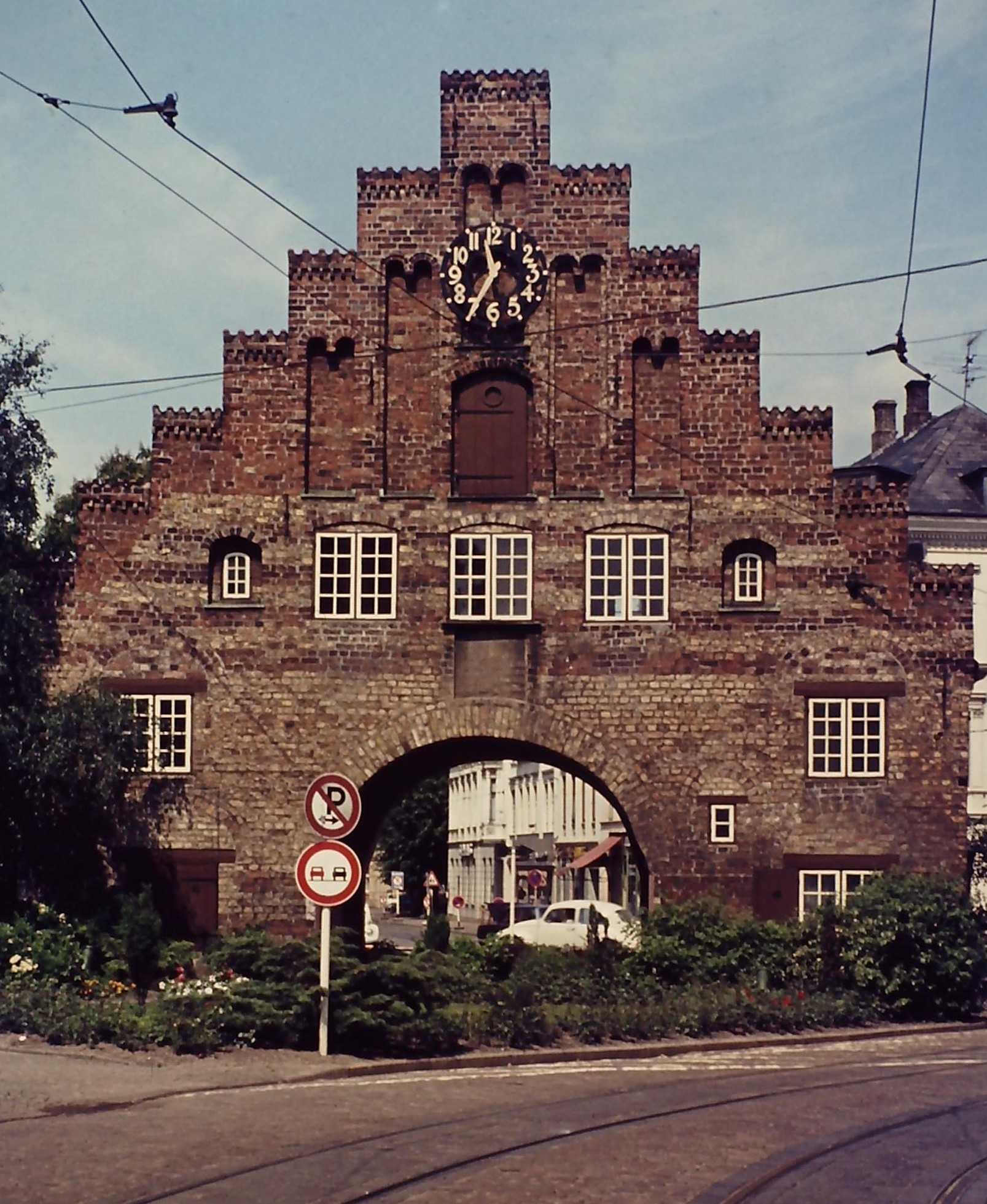
The Nordertor 1972

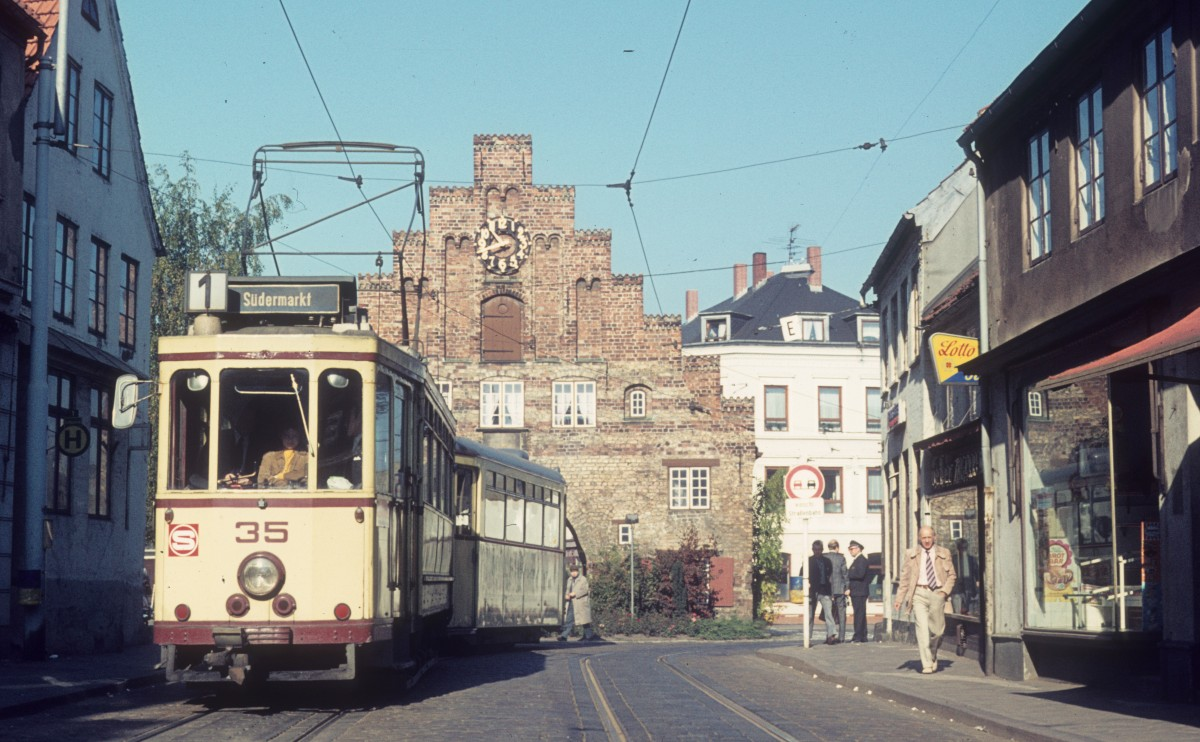
Flensburg's tramway in front of the Nordertor in 1972
