= Klues Forest =

Coordinates: 54°49′35″N 9°24′32″E

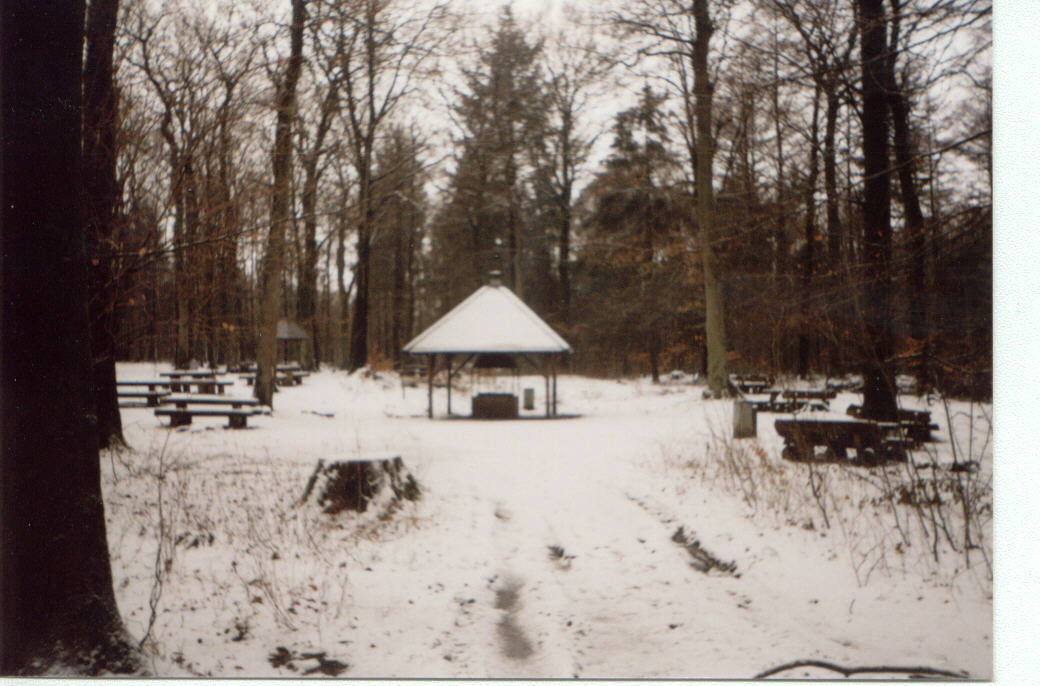
Leisure facility in Klues Forest

The Klues Forest (German: Klueser Wald or Kluesries and Danish: Klusris) is a forest which lies in Schleswig-Holstein/North-Germany, between Flensburg and Harrislee.

Klues Forest has a size of nearly 436 morgen. The forest is populated with typical trees for the area and climate, such as beech, oak, ash, alder and spruce.

Many people of Flensburg and neighboring Denmark use the forest for its aesthetic presence and local recreation. The "Erholungswald" (recreational forest) area, with a size of 304 morgen, has barbecues, a natural children's playground and a "Waldlehrgarten", that presents information about trees, the forest, and the history of Klues Forest and the area it belongs to.

The forest is part of the "Forstamt Schleswig-Holstein", the forest district of Schleswig-Holstein.

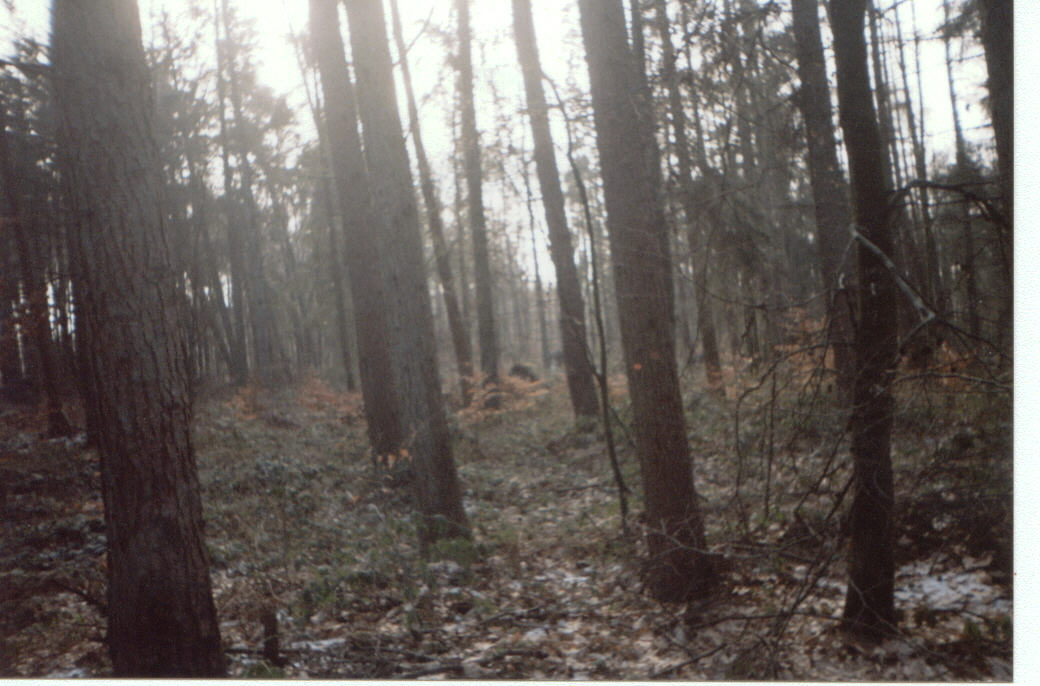
Klues Forest
