= Uta Wentzel =

German politician (born 1979)

Member of the Landtag of Schleswig-Holstein
- Incumbent
- Assumed office 7 June 2022
- Preceded by: Heiner Dunckel
- Constituency: Flensburg

Personal details
- Born: 3 June 1979 (age 46) Flensburg
- Party: Christian Democratic Union (since 2014)

Uta Wentzel (born 3 June 1979 in Flensburg) is a German politician serving as a member of the Landtag of Schleswig-Holstein since 2022. She has served as chairwoman of the Christian Democratic Union in Flensburg since 2023.
