= Flensburg =

Flensburg Flensborg (Danish, Low Saxon) Flensborre (South Jutlandic) Flansborj, Flensborag (North Frisian)
- Municipality
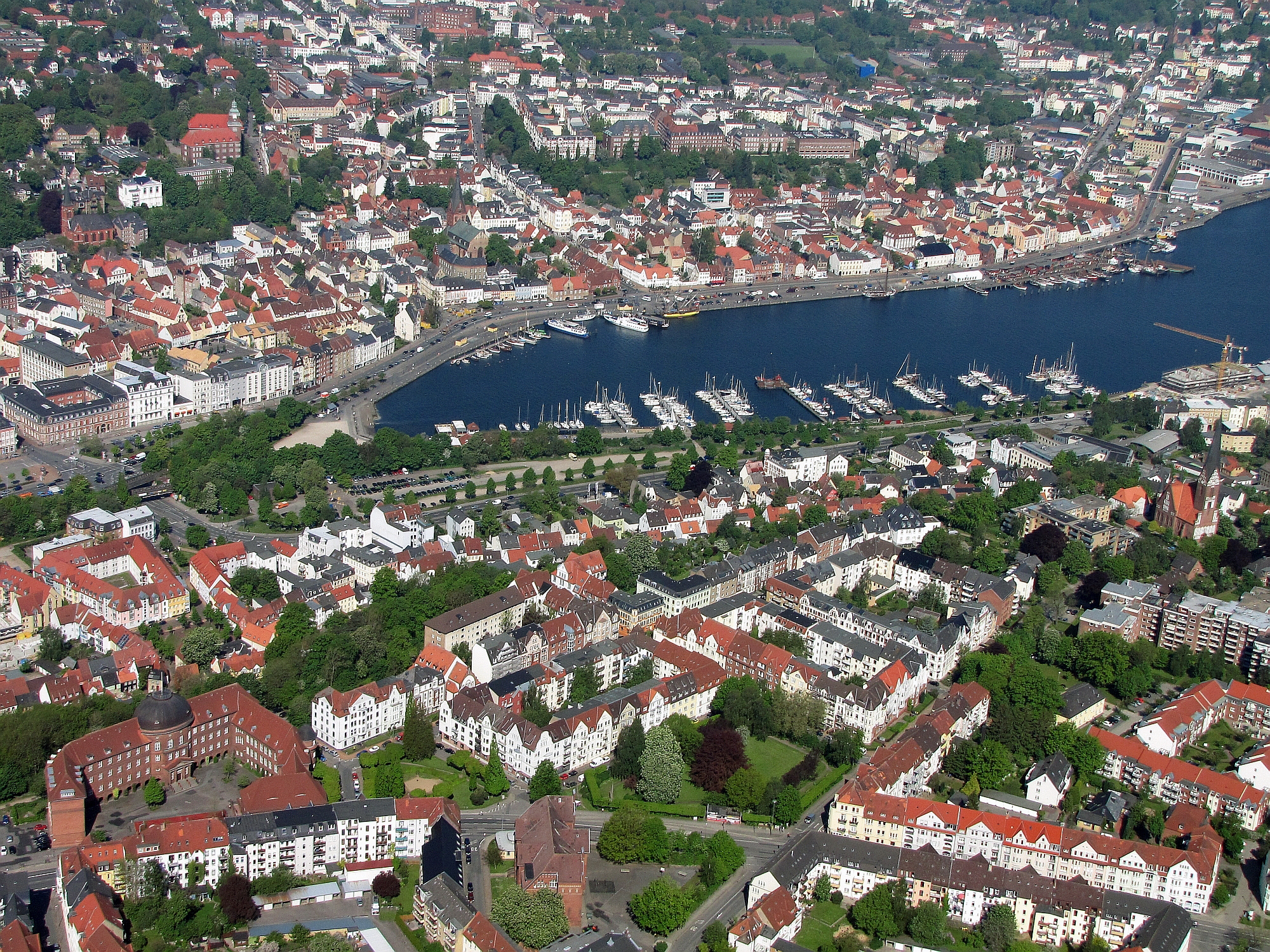
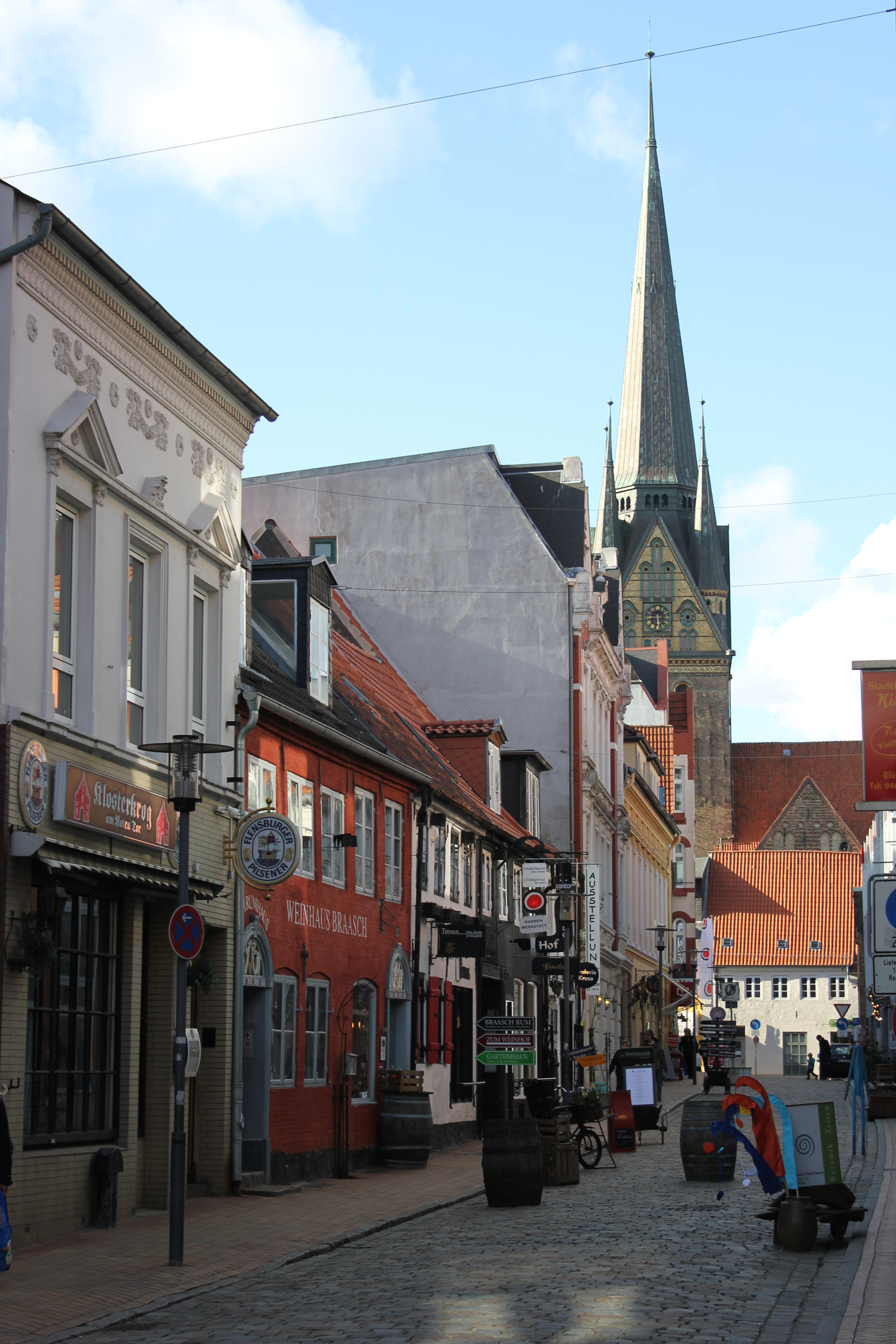
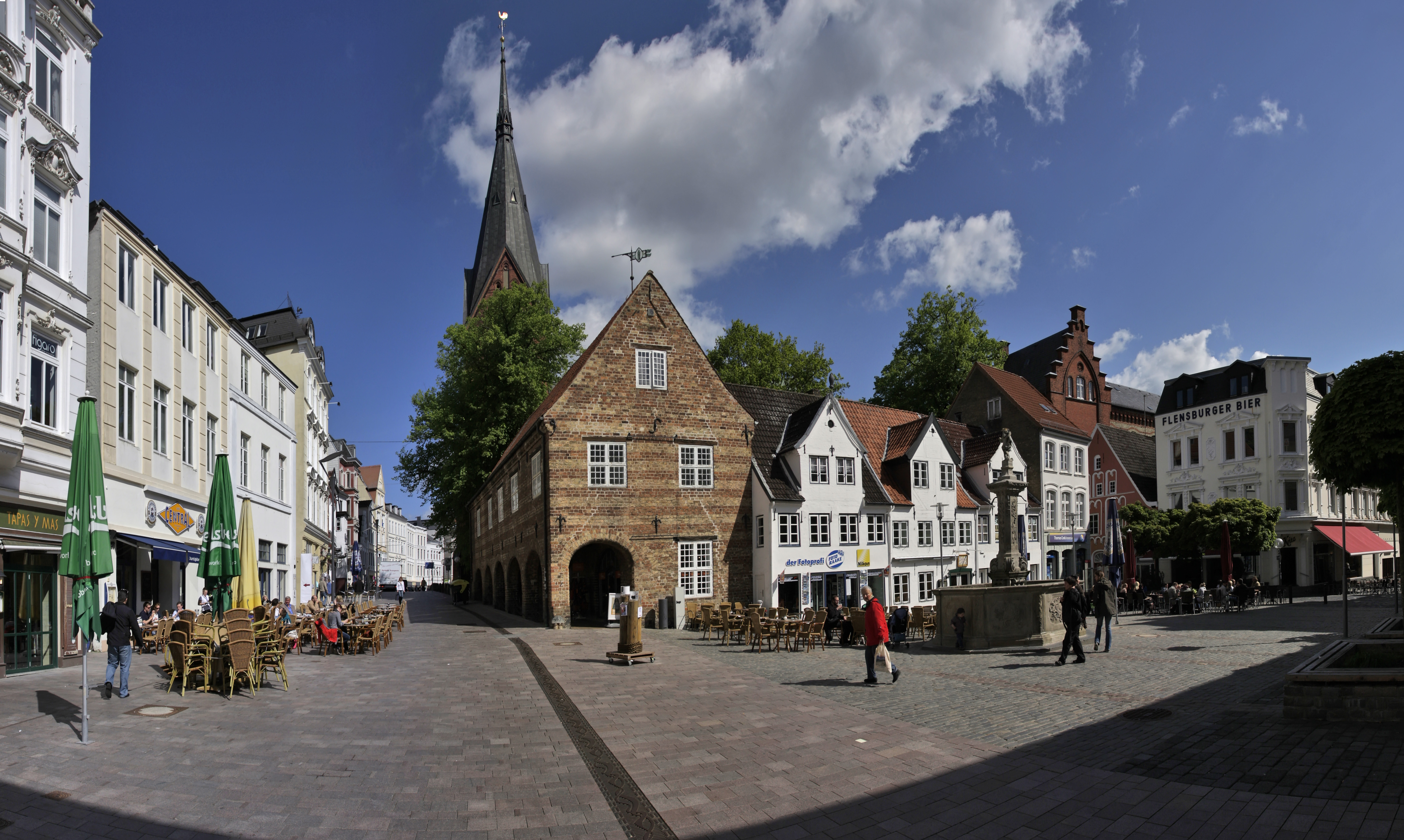
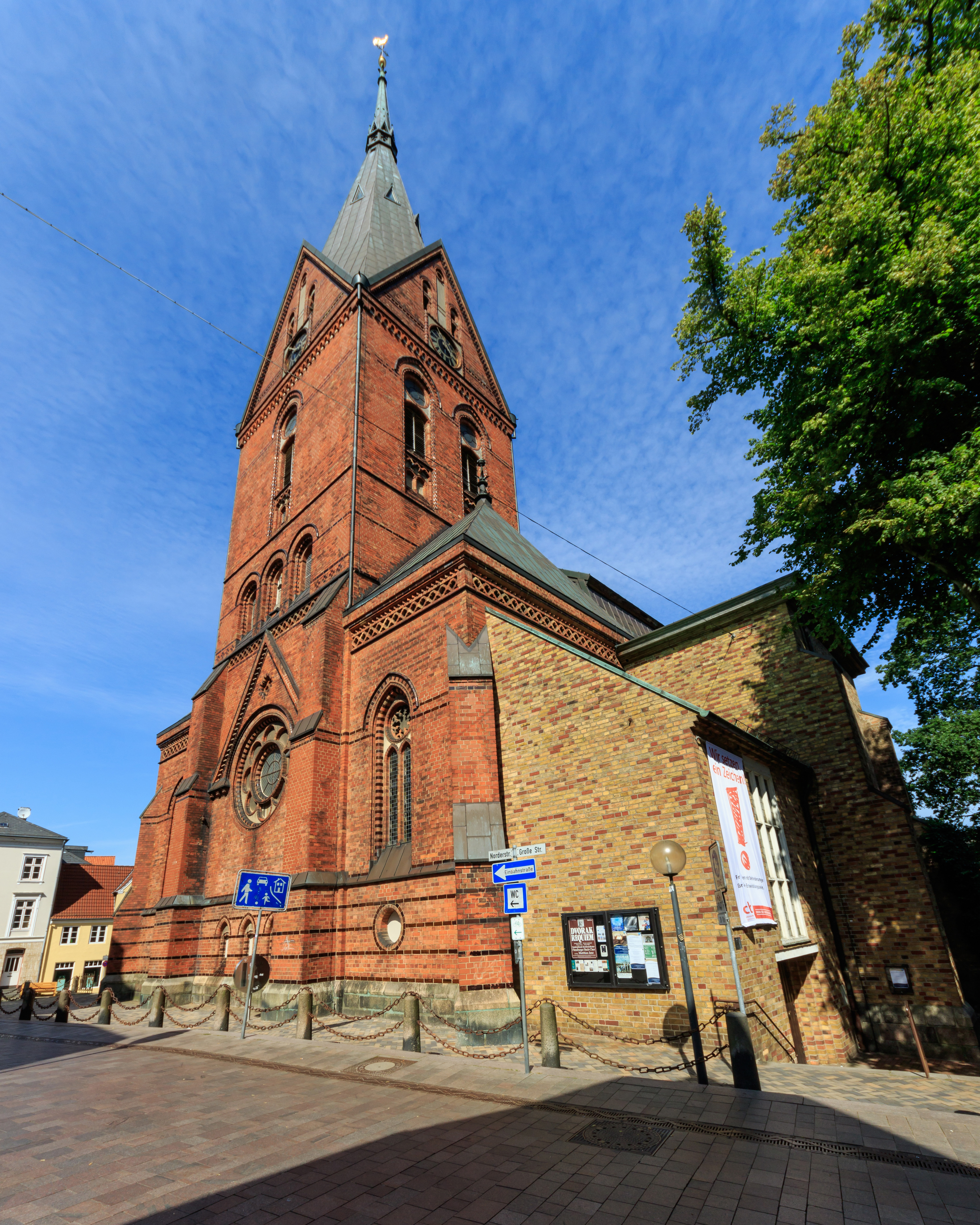
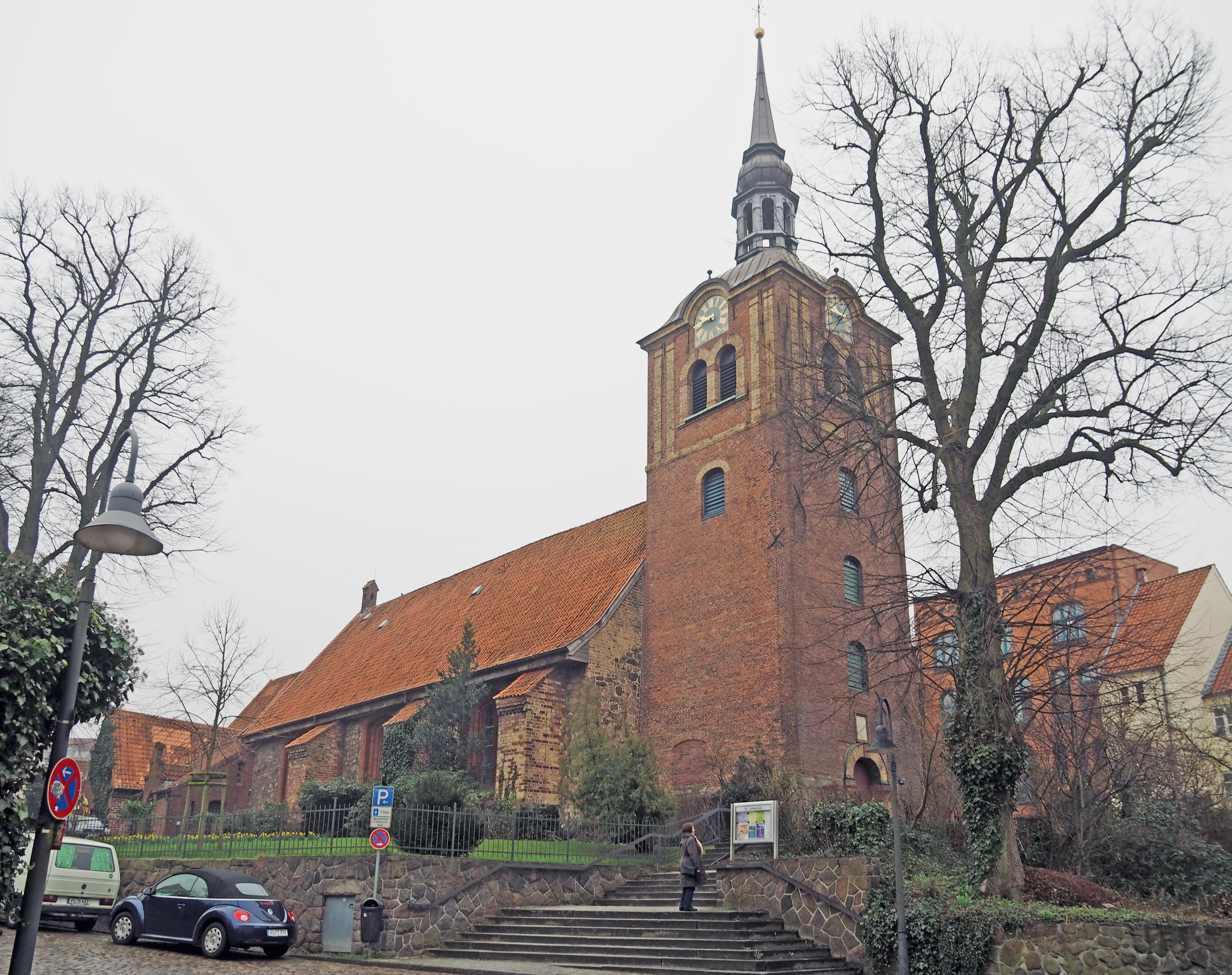
- Town centre and harbour Rote Straße Nordermarkt St. Mary Church Johannischurch

- Flag Coat of arms
- Interactive map of Flensburg
- Location within Germany Location within Schleswig-Holstein
- Coordinates: 54°46′55″N 09°26′12″E
- Country: Germany
- State: Schleswig-Holstein
- District: Urban district
- Subdivisions: 13 Stadtbezirke

Government
  - Mayor: Fabian Geyer (Ind.)

Area
  - Total: 56.73 km^{2} (21.90 sq mi)
- Elevation: 12 m (39 ft)

Population (2025-12-31)
  - Total: 95,568
  - Density: 1,685/km^{2} (4,363/sq mi)
- Time zone: UTC+01:00 (CET)
  - Summer (DST): UTC+02:00 (CEST)
- Postal codes: 24901–24944
- Dialling codes: 0461
- Vehicle registration: FL
- Website: www.flensburg.de

Flensburg (German: [ˈflɛnsbʊɐ̯k]; Danish and Low Saxon: Flensborg; South Jutlandic: Flensborre; North Frisian: Flansborj, Flensborag) is a town in the German state of Schleswig-Holstein. After Kiel and Lübeck, it is the third-largest urban area in Schleswig-Holstein. Flensburg's city centre lies about 7 km (4 mi) from the Danish border.

Flensburg was founded around the 12th century and developed rapidly during the Middle Ages as a major port for trade between the Kingdom of Denmark and the Hanseatic League. In the 16th century, it became part of the Danish Kingdom and remained under Danish rule until the early 19th century. Following the Danish-Prussian War of 1864, Flensburg became part of the Kingdom of Prussia. During the 20th century, the town transformed into a centre for both commerce and industry. It served as the seat of the Flensburg Government, the final administrative (and abortive) form of Nazi Germany, from 2 May 1945 until its dissolution in early June 1945.

Today, Flensburg is known for its maritime heritage, its role as a border town with Denmark, and its well-preserved historic architecture. It is the cultural and organisational centre of the Danish minority of Southern Schleswig.

== Geography ==
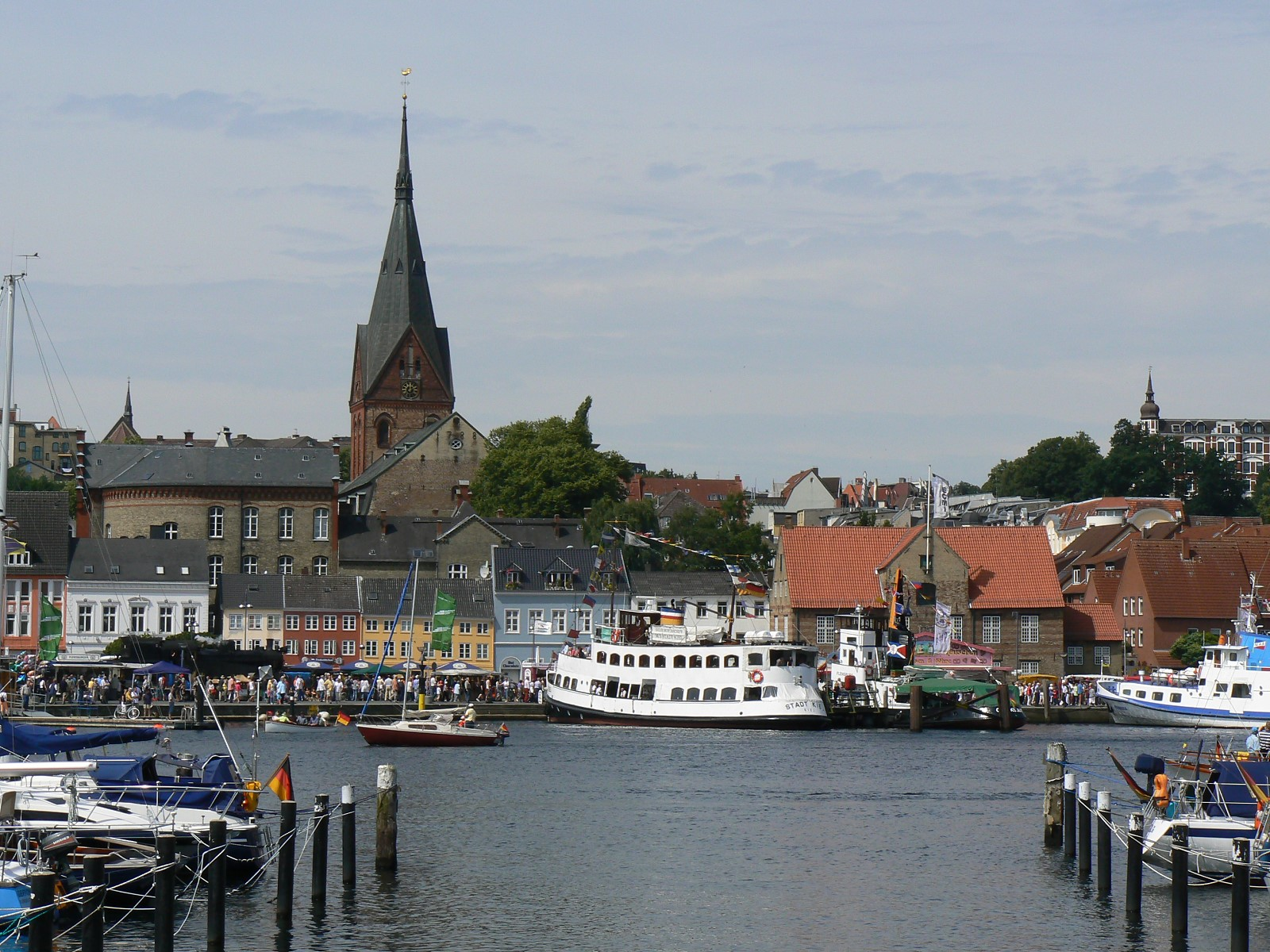
Harbour of Flensburg, western shore, with the church "Sankt Marien" (Saint Mary)

Flensburg is in the north of the German state Schleswig-Holstein, very close to the German-Danish border. After Glücksburg and Westerland, it is Germany's northernmost town. Flensburg lies at the innermost tip of the Flensburg Firth, an inlet of the Baltic Sea. Flensburg's eastern shore is part of the Angeln peninsula.

=== Neighbouring municipalities ===
Clockwise from the northeast, beginning at the German shore of the Flensburg Firth, the following communities in Schleswig-Flensburg district and Denmark's Southern Denmark Region all border Flensburg:

Glücksburg (Amt-free town), Wees (Amt Langballig), Maasbüll, Hürup, Tastrup and Freienwill (all in Amt Hürup), Jarplund-Weding, Handewitt (Amt Handewitt), Harrislee (Amt-free community) and Aabenraa Municipality on the Danish shore of the Flensburg Firth.

=== Constituent communities ===
The town of Flensburg is divided into 13 communities, which are further divided into 38 statistical areas. Constituent communities have a two-digit number and the statistical areas a three-digit number.

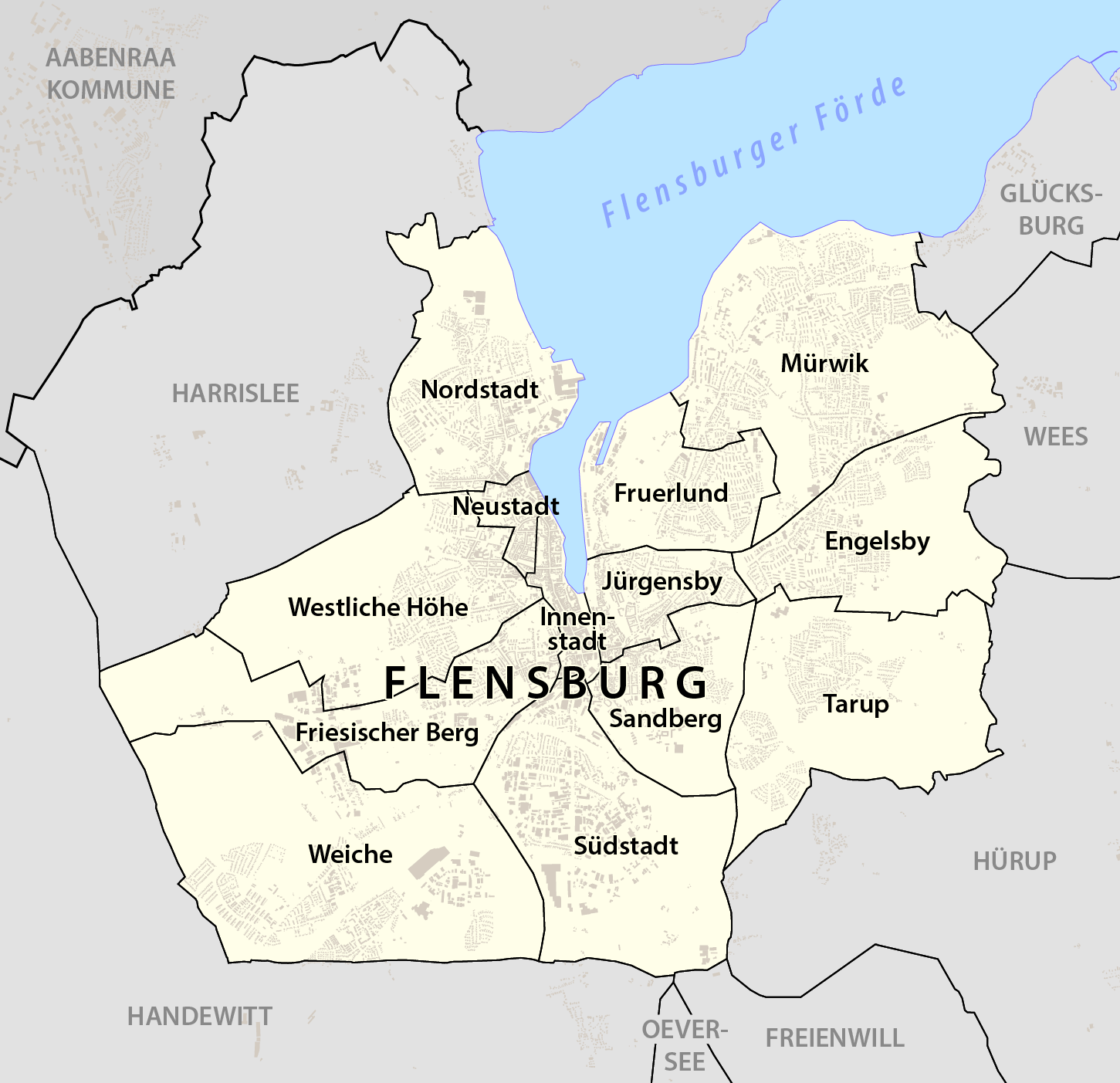
Communities and neighbouring municipalities of Flensburg

The communities with their statistical areas:

- 01 Altstadt (Old Town) Lies somewhat down towards the sea rather than right downtown.
  - 011 St. Nikolai (Danish: Skt. Nikolaj)
  - 012 St. Marien
  - 013 Nordertor (Danish: Nørreport)
- 02 Neustadt (Danish: Nystaden)
  - 021 Duburg (Danish: Duborg)
  - 022 Neustadt Nord
- 03 Nordstadt (Danish: Nordstaden)
  - 031 Kreuz (Danish: Kors)
  - 032 Galwik (Danish: Galvig)
  - 033 Klues (Danish: Klus)
- 04 Westliche Höhe
  - 041 Stadtpark (Danish: Byparken)
  - 042 Marienhölzung (Danish: Frueskov)
  - 043 St. Gertrud
  - 044 Friedhof
- 05 Friesischer Berg (Danish: Friserbjerg)
  - 051 Exe (Danish: Exe or Eksercerløkke)
  - 052 Museumsberg
  - 053 Friedenshügel (Danish: Fredshøj)
- 06 Weiche (Danish: Sporskifte)
  - 061 Sophienhof (Danish: Sophiegård)
  - 062 Schäferhaus (Danish: Skæferhus)
- 07 Südstadt
  - 071 Martinsberg (Danish: Martinsbjerg)
  - 072 Rude (Danish: Ryde)
  - 073 Peelwatt (Danish: Pælevad)
- 08 Sandberg (Danish: Sandbjerg)
  - 081 Achter de Möhl (Danish: Fiskergaarden)
  - 082 Adelbylund
  - 083 Sünderup (Danish: Synderup)
- 09 Jürgensby (Danish: Jørgensby)
  - 091 St. Johannis (Danish: Sankt Hans)
  - 092 St. Jürgen (Danish: Sankt Jørgen)
  - 093 Jürgensgaard (Danish: Jørgensgaard)
  - 094 Sender Flensburg-Jürgensby
- 10 Fruerlund
  - 101 Blasberg (Danish: Blæsbjerg)
  - 102 Bohlberg (Danish: Bolsbjerg)
  - 103 Fruerlund Hof
- 11 Mürwik (Danish: Mørvig)
  - 111 Stützpunkt
  - 112 Osbek (Danish: Osbæk)
  - 113 Wasserloos (Danish: Vandløs)
  - 114 Friedheim
  - 115 Solitüde (Danish: Solitude)
- 12 Engelsby
  - 121 Engelsby Süd
  - 122 Vogelsang (Danish: Fuglsang)
- 13 Tarup
  - 130 Tarup

=== Climate ===
Climate data for Leck (Note: Leck is located approximately 30 kilometres (18.6 mi) west of Flensburg.) (1991–2020 normals)
Month	Jan	Feb	Mar	Apr	May	Jun	Jul	Aug	Sep	Oct	Nov	Dec	Year
Mean daily maximum °C (°F)	4.1 (39.4)	4.5 (40.1)	7.3 (45.1)	12.5 (54.5)	16.3 (61.3)	19.0 (66.2)	21.5 (70.7)	21.4 (70.5)	17.8 (64.0)	13.0 (55.4)	8.0 (46.4)	5.0 (41.0)	12.5 (54.5)
Daily mean °C (°F)	1.9 (35.4)	1.9 (35.4)	3.9 (39.0)	7.7 (45.9)	11.6 (52.9)	14.7 (58.5)	17.0 (62.6)	16.8 (62.2)	13.7 (56.7)	9.7 (49.5)	5.6 (42.1)	2.9 (37.2)	8.9 (48.0)
Mean daily minimum °C (°F)	−0.5 (31.1)	−0.6 (30.9)	0.5 (32.9)	3.1 (37.6)	6.5 (43.7)	9.8 (49.6)	12.0 (53.6)	11.9 (53.4)	9.5 (49.1)	6.3 (43.3)	2.8 (37.0)	0.3 (32.5)	5.1 (41.2)
Average precipitation mm (inches)	70.0 (2.76)	50.6 (1.99)	48.7 (1.92)	35.1 (1.38)	48.9 (1.93)	72.5 (2.85)	80.1 (3.15)	92.2 (3.63)	89.4 (3.52)	91.5 (3.60)	77.5 (3.05)	81.8 (3.22)	852.7 (33.57)
Average precipitation days (≥ 1.0 mm)	20.0	17.0	16.2	12.8	13.1	14.9	15.4	17.8	17.1	18.9	19.4	20.6	200.7
Average relative humidity (%)	90.9	88.5	84.7	77.7	76.0	77.3	78.1	80.0	83.7	86.8	90.3	91.6	83.8
Mean monthly sunshine hours	45.1	63.3	120.7	187.8	232.8	219.1	222.0	199.6	143.9	94.8	51.0	37.8	1,611.3
Source: World Meteorological Organization

== History ==
=== Middle Ages ===
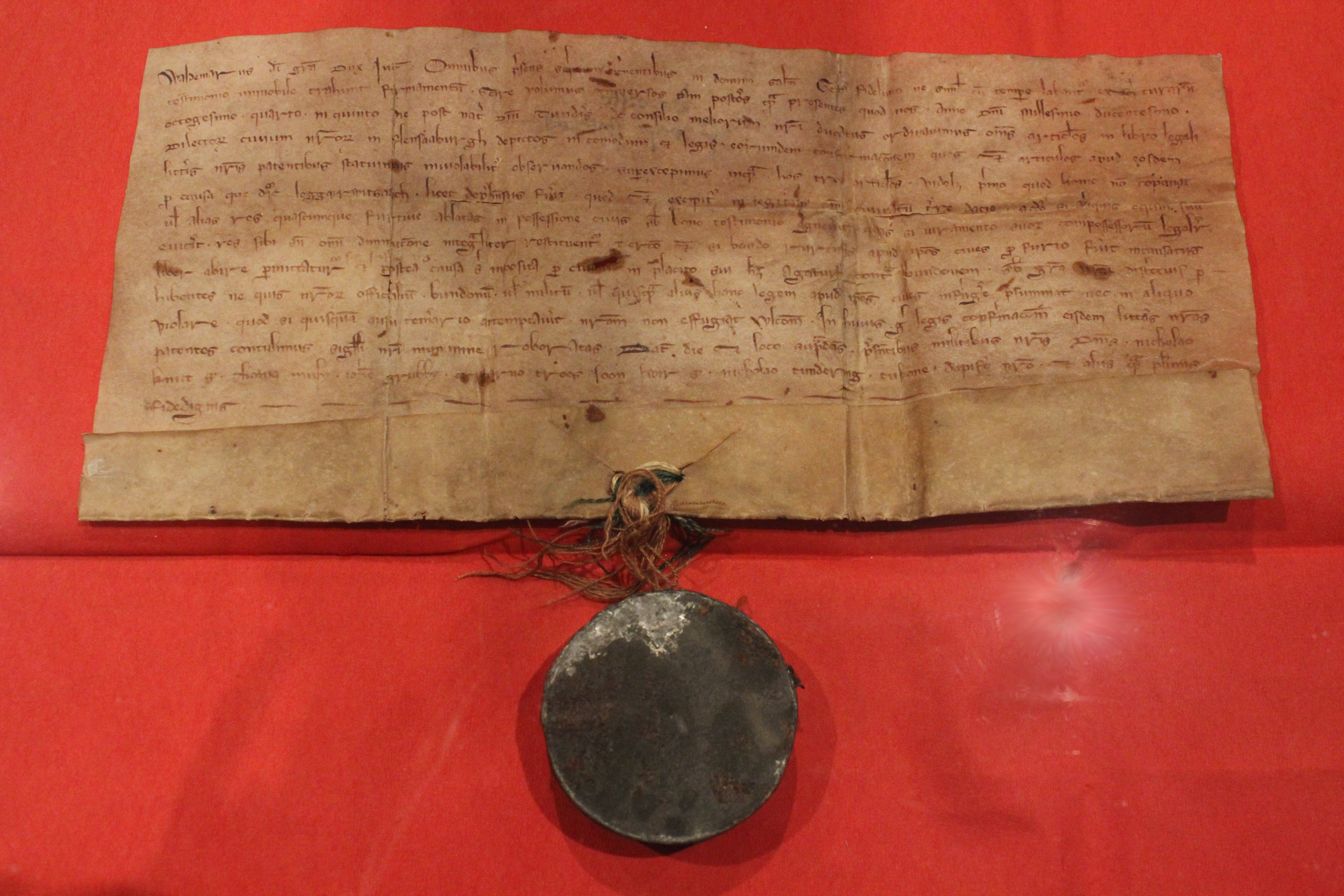
The town charter of Flensburg (1284)

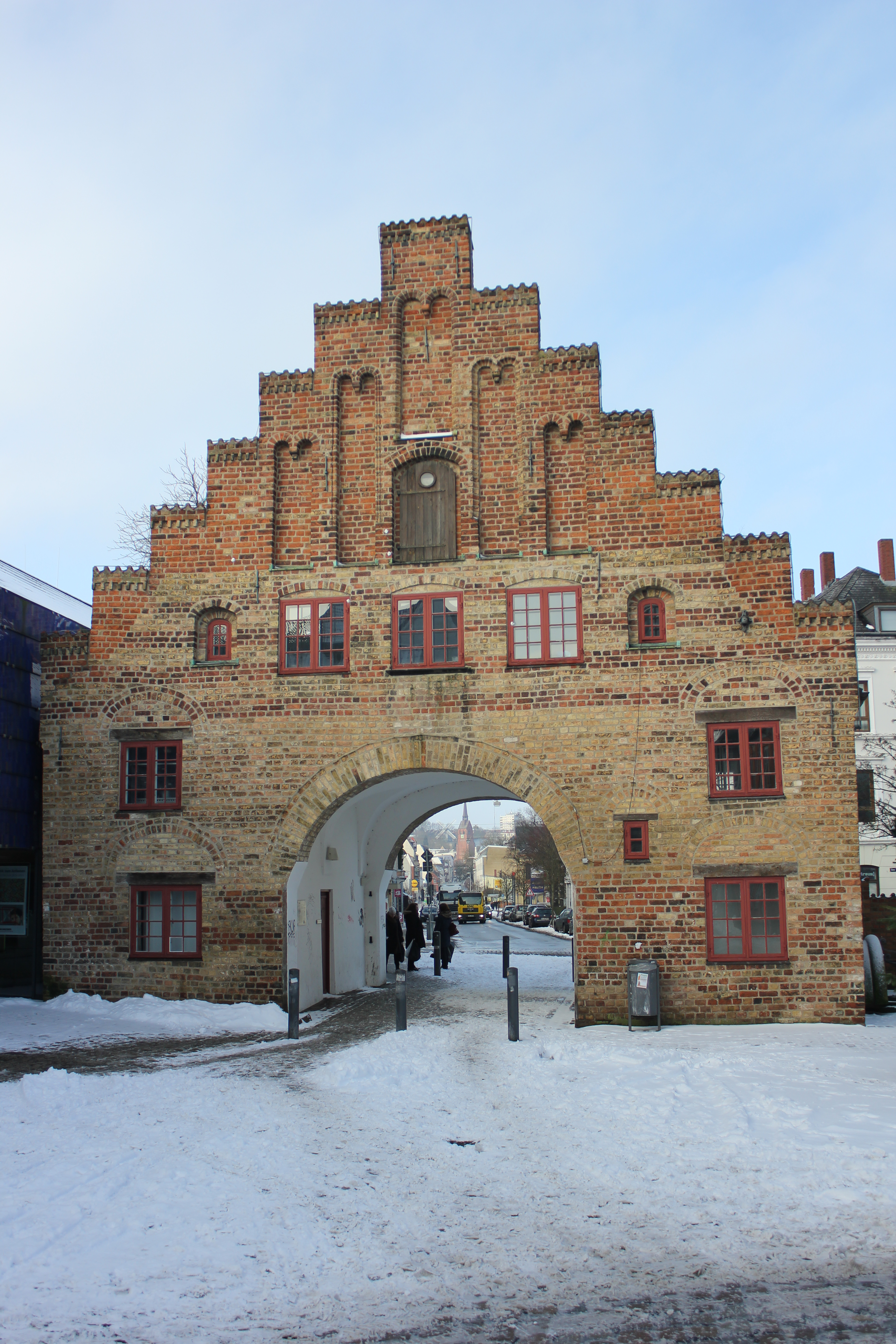
The Nordertor, a town gate, in winter

Flensburg was founded at the latest by 1200 at the innermost end of the Flensburg Firth by Danish settlers, who were soon joined by German merchants. In 1284, its town rights were confirmed and the town quickly became one of the most important in the Duchy of Schleswig. Unlike Holstein, Schleswig did not belong to the German Holy Roman Empire. Therefore, Flensburg was not a member of the Hanseatic League, but did maintain contacts with it.

Historians presume that there were several reasons this spot was chosen for settlement:

- Shelter from heavy winds
- A trade route between Holstein and North Jutland (namely the Hærvejen or Ochsenweg, a series of roads between Hamburg, Schleswig-Holstein and Jutland, possibly dating from the Bronze Age)
- The Angelnway: a trade route between North Frisia and Angeln
- A good herring fishery

Herrings, especially kippered, brought about the blossoming of the town's trade in the Middle Ages. They were sent inland and to almost every European country.

On 28 October 1412, Queen Margaret I of Denmark died of the plague aboard a ship in Flensburg Harbour.

From time to time plagues such as bubonic plague, caused mainly by rat fleas (Xenopsylla cheopis, a parasite found on brown rats), "red" dysentery and other scourges killed much of Flensburg's population. Lepers were strictly isolated at the St.-Jürgen-Hospital (Helligåndshospital, built before 1290), far outside the town's gates, where St. Jürgen Church is now. About 1500, syphilis also appeared. The church hospital "Zum Heiligen Geist" ("To the Holy Ghost") stood in Große Straße, now Flensburg's pedestrian precinct.

A Flensburger's everyday life was very hard, and the old roads and paths were bad. The main streets were neither paved nor lit at night. When the streets became really bad, citizens made the dung-filled streets passable with wooden pathways. Only the few upper-class houses had windows. In 1485, a great fire struck Flensburg. Storm tides also beset the town occasionally. Every household in the town kept livestock in the house and the yard. Townsfolk furthermore had their own cowherds and a swineherd.

=== Early modern times ===
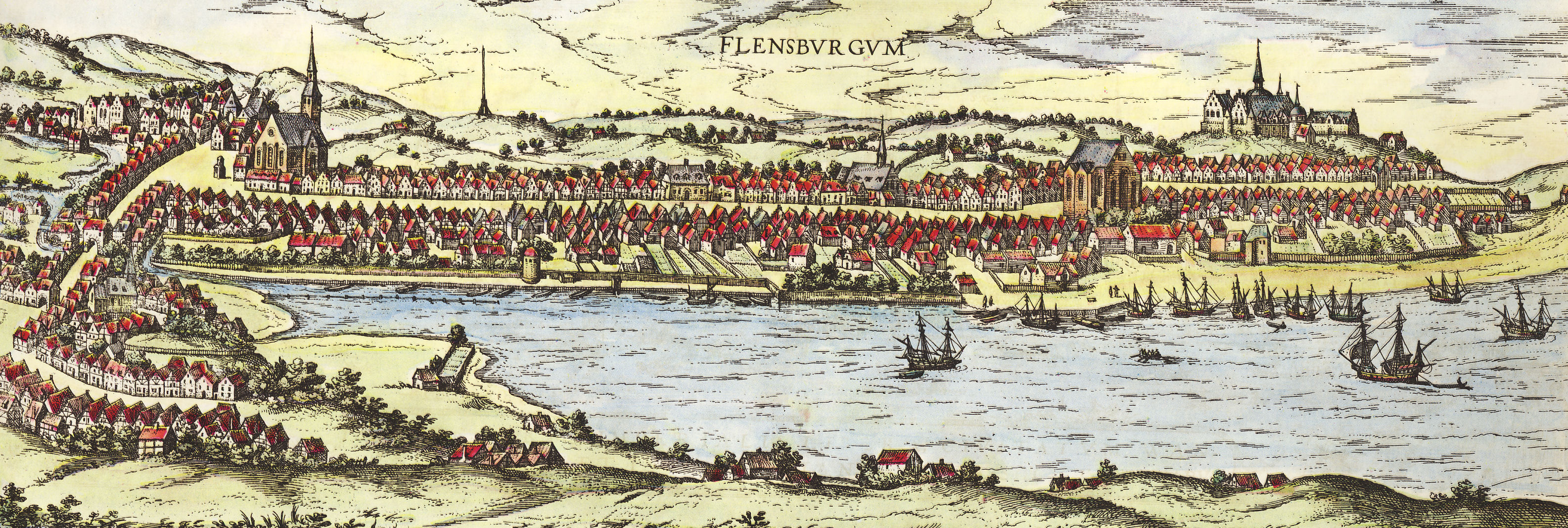
Flensburg, early 17th century

After the fall of the Hanseatic League in the 16th century, Flensburg was said to be one of the most important trading towns in the Scandinavian area. Flensburg merchants were active as far away as the Mediterranean, Greenland, and the Caribbean. The most important commodities, after herring, were sugar and whale oil, the latter from whaling off Greenland. But the Thirty Years' War put an end to this boom time. The town was becoming Protestant and ever more German culturally and linguistically, while the neighbouring countryside remained decidedly Danish.

In the 18th century, thanks to the rum trade, Flensburg had yet another boom. Cane sugar was imported from the Danish West Indies (now the US Virgin Islands) and refined in Flensburg. Only in the 19th century, as a result of industrialization, was the town at last outstripped by the competition from cities such as Copenhagen and Hamburg.

The rum produced in Flensburg was then reintegrated into West Indian trade routes, which as of 1864 moved away from the Danish West Indies to the British colony of Jamaica instead. It was imported from there, blended, and sold all over Europe. There is now only one active rum distillery in Flensburg, "A. H. Johannsen".

=== Prussian and German rule ===
Between 1460 and 1864, Flensburg was, after Copenhagen, the Kingdom of Denmark's second-biggest port, but it passed to the Kingdom of Prussia after the Second Schleswig War in 1864. The Battle of Flensburg was fought on February 6, 1864: near the city a small Hungarian mounted regiment chased a Danish infantry and Dragoon regiment. At the election for the North German Reichstag in 1867, there had still been a Danish majority in Flensburg, and it continued until around 1880. However, thereafter, the majority shifted partly due to immigration of workers from other parts of Germany and because the bureaucracy was largely replaced with Germans from the south. Today, a sizable Danish community remains in the town. Some estimates put the percentage of Flensburgers who belong to it as high as 25%; other estimates put it much lower. The SSW political party representing the minority usually gains 20–25% of the votes in local elections, but not all its voters are Danes. Before 1864, Danes consisted of the vast majority, which belonged to what is now the minority; even today there are many Danish surnames in the Flensburg telephone directory (Asmussen, Claussen, Jacobsen, Jensen, Petersen, etc.). However, the upper classes at that time, comprising merchants, bureaucrats, academics, and the clergy, were predominantly German.

On 1 April 1889, Flensburg became an independent city (kreisfreie Stadt) within the Province of Schleswig-Holstein, and at the same time still kept its status as seat of the Flensburg district. In 1920, the League of Nations decided that the matter of the German–Danish border would be settled by a vote. As a result of the plebiscite, and the way the voting zones were laid out, some of Flensburg's northern neighbourhoods were ceded to Denmark, whereas Flensburg as a whole voted by a large margin to stay in Germany.

In return for this pro-German vote, Flensburg was given a large hall, the "Deutsches Haus", which the government endowed as "thanks for German loyalty".

==== World War II ====
During the Second World War, the town was left almost unscathed by the air raids that devastated other German cities. But in 1943, 20 children died when a nursery school was bombed, and shortly after the war ended, an explosion at a local munitions storage site claimed many victims. Four prisoners of war (two Norwegians, one Australian, and one New Zealander) who took part in the Great Escape from the Stalag Luft III POW camp were captured by the Germans in the city, and later murdered in another location.

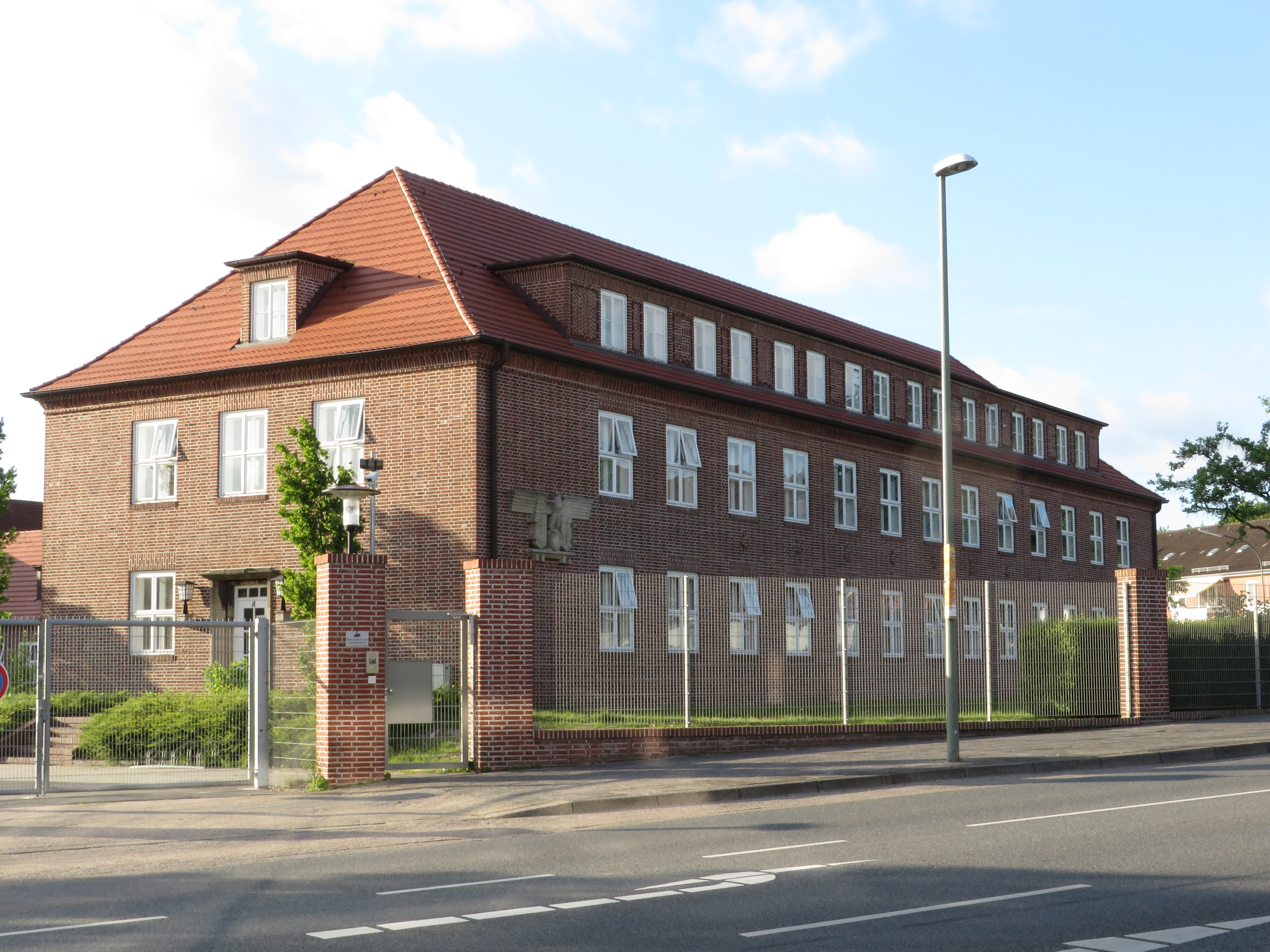
The Sportschool in Mürwik, at the Naval Academy Mürwik, where the seat of the Flensburg Government was located in 1945 (photo 2014)

In 1945, Admiral Karl Dönitz, who was briefly President (Reichspräsident) of Nazi Germany after Adolf Hitler appointed him his successor and then killed himself, fled to Flensburg with what was left of his government. The so-called Flensburg Government, led by Dönitz, was in power from 1 May, the announcement of Hitler's death, for one week, until German troops surrendered and the town was occupied by Allied troops. The regime was effectively dissolved on 23 May, when the British Army arrested Dönitz and his ministers in Mürwik and detained them in the Navy School in Mürwik (German: Marineschule Mürwik). The Berlin Declaration promulgated on 5 June formalized the dissolution. Flensburg was therefore, for a few weeks, the seat of the last Third Reich government.

=== Since the Second World War ===
After the Second World War, the town's population broke the 100,000 mark for a short time, making Flensburg a city (Großstadt) under one traditional definition. The population later sank below that mark.

In the years after the Second World War, South Schleswig, and particularly Flensburg, had a strong pro-Danish movement connected with the idea of the "Eider Politics". Its goal was for the town and all or most of Schleswig, the whole area north of the Eider River, to be united with Denmark. After 1945, Flensburg's town council was for years dominated by Danish parties, and the town had a Danish mayor.

The town profited from the planned location of military installations. Since German Reunification, the number of soldiers has dropped to about 8,000. Since Denmark's entry into the European Economic Community (now the European Union), border trade has played an important role in Flensburg's economic life. Some Danish businesses, such as Danfoss, have set up shop just south of the border for tax reasons.

In 1970, the Flensburg district was expanded to include the municipalities in the Amt of Medelby, formerly in the Südtondern district, and in 1974 it was united with the Schleswig district to form the district of Schleswig-Flensburg, whose district seat was the town of Schleswig. Flensburg thereby lost its function as a district seat but remained an independent (district-free) town.

=== Amalgamations ===
Until the middle of the 19th century, Flensburg's municipal area comprised an area of 2,639 ha. Beginning in 1874, the following communities or rural areas (Gemarkungen) were annexed to the town of Flensburg:

Year	Place(s)	Area added in ha
1874	Süder- and Norder-St. Jürgen	36
1874	Fischerhof	3
27 July 1875	Duburg	10.5
1877	Hohlwege and Bredeberg	5.5
1 December 1900	Jürgensgaarde	205
1 April 1909	Klues	19
1 April 1910	Twedt, Twedterholz/Fruerlund and Engelsby	1458
1916	part of Klues Forest (incl. open waters)	146.5
26 April 1970	Adelbylund	132
10 February 1971	demerger of Wassersleben Beach	-147.5
22 March 1974	Sünderup and Tarup	?

=== Population development ===
Population figures are for respective municipal areas through time. Until 1870, figures are mostly estimates, and thereafter census results (¹) or official projections from either statistical offices or the town administration itself.

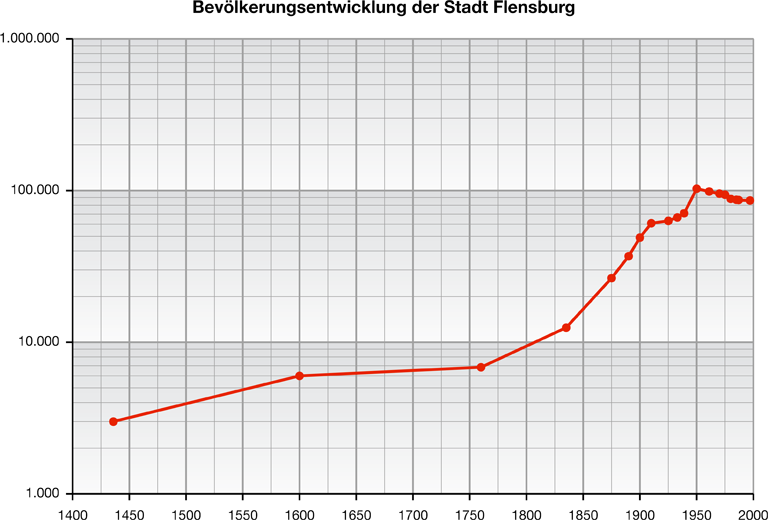
Population development

Year	Population figure
1436	3000
1600	6000
1760	6842
1835	12,483
1 December 1875 ¹	26,474
1 December 1890 ¹	36,894
1 December 1900 ¹	48,937
1 December 1910 ¹	60,922
16 June 1925 ¹	63,139
16 June 1933 ¹	66,580
17 May 1939 ¹	70,871
13 September 1950 ¹	102,832
6 June 1961 ¹	98,464
27 May 1970 ¹	95,400
30 June 1975	93,900
30 June 1980	88,200
30 June 1985	86,900
27 May 1987 ¹	86,554
30 June 1997	86,100
31 December 2003	85,300
31 December 2012	89,375

¹ Census results

== Danish minority ==
Significant minority groups
Nationality	Population (31.12.2022)
Romania	3,095
Syria	2,930
Denmark	2,455
Afghanistan	1,285
Ukraine	1,120

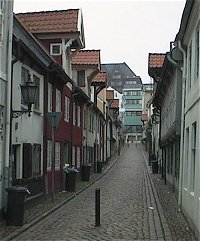
Oluf Samson Gang in the oldest part of the town with the Danish Library in the background

The Danish minority in Flensburg (Danish: Flensborg) and the surrounding towns runs its own schools, libraries, and Lutheran churches, from which the German majority is not excluded. These two groups' coexistence is considered a sound and healthy symbiosis. A form of mixed Danish–German, Petuh, is used on the ferries.

There is also a Danish Consulate-General in Flensburg.

In Denmark, Flensburg seems to be mainly known for its "border shops" where, among other things, spirits, beer and candy are for sale at lower prices than in Denmark. The prices are lower because the value-added tax is lower and excise taxes are either lower (e.g., on alcohol) or do not exist (e.g., on sugar). The border shops may sell canned beer to Scandinavia residents without paying deposits as long as it is not consumed in Germany.

== Politics ==
For centuries, two mayors led the town council, one for the north town (St. Marien) and one for the south town (St. Nikolai and St. Johannis). The council members and mayors were chosen by the council itself: retiring officials' successors were named by the remaining councillors in such a way that both halves of the town had as many members. These councillors usually bore the title "Senator".

This "town government" lasted until 1742 when the "northern mayor" was made the "directing mayor" by the Danish King. From this position came what was later known as the First Mayor. The second mayor simply bore the title "mayor" ("Bürgermeister"). After the town was ceded to Prussia, the townsfolk elected the mayors as of 1870, and the First Mayor was given the title Oberbürgermeister, still the usual title in German towns and cities. During the Third Reich, the town head was appointed by those who held power locally.

In 1945, after the Second World War, a twofold leadership based on a British model was introduced. Heading the town stood foremost the Oberbürgermeister, who was chosen by the town council and whose job was as chairman of council and the municipality. Next to him was an Oberstadtdirektor ("Higher Town Director"), who was leader of administration. In 1950, when Schleswig-Holstein brought its new laws for municipalities into force, the title Oberbürgermeister was transferred (once again) to this latter official. At first, and for a while, he was chosen by the council. Since that time, the former official has been called the Stadtpräsident ("Town President"), and is likewise chosen by the council after each municipal election. Since 1999, the Oberbürgermeister has been chosen directly by the voters, as before.

The first directly elected Oberbürgermeister, Hermann Stell, died on 4 May 2004 of a stroke. On 14 November 2004, the independent candidate suggested by the CDU, Klaus Tscheuschner, was elected to replace Stell with 59% of the vote. In the 2003 municipal election, Hans Hermann Laturnus was elected Stadtpräsident.

In the 2008 municipal election, the local list WiF (Wir in Flensburg) was elected the largest group in the Council Assembly of Flensburg, with 10 city councillors out of 43, closely followed by the South Schleswig Voter Federation (Südschleswigscher Wählerverband) (9 councillors) and the CDU (9 councillors). Also elected was the SPD (seven councillors), the Greens (3 councillors), the Left (3 councillors) and the FDP (2 councillors). Nevertheless, since the WiF-group was divided into two different caucuses, the SSW-group has been the assembly's largest group. The City President is Christian Dewanger (WiF).

In the 2010 mayoral election, Simon Faber (SSW) was elected Lord Mayor of the town in a runoff election with 54.8% of the vote. He was the first person from the Danish Minority to occupy this office since the end of World War II.

=== Mayor ===
The mayor of Flensburg is Fabian Geyer, who was elected in 2022. He took office on 15 January 2023.

=== City council ===
Results of the 2023 city council election

Results of the 2018 city council election

The Flensburg city council governs the city alongside the mayor. The most recent city council election was held on 14 May 2023, and the results were as follows:

Party	Votes	%	±	Seats	±
South Schleswig Voters' Association (SSW)	6,785	24.8	▲7.2	11	▲3
Alliance 90/The Greens (Grüne)	6,470	23.6	▲4.8	10	▲2
Christian Democratic Union (CDU)	5,248	19.1	▼0.2	8	±0
Social Democratic Party (SPD)	3,703	13.5	▼4.7	6	▼2
Free Democratic Party (FDP)	1,553	5.7	▼2.1	2	▼1
The Left (Die Linke)	1,133	4.1	▼3.3	2	▼1
We in Flensburg (WiF)	670	2.4	▼6.1	1	▼3
Solidarity City Alliance (BüsoS)	571	2.1	▲2.1	1	▲1
Grassroots Democratic Party of Germany (dieBasis)	525	1.9	▲1.9	1	▲1
Flensburg Votes! (FLW)	429	1.5	▼0.7	1	±0
Volt Germany (Volt)	328	1.2	▲1.2	1	▲1
Valid votes	27,406	99.2			
Invalid votes	219	0.8			
Total	27,625	100.0		44	▲1
Electorate/voter turnout	77,296	35.7	▲0.1		
Source: City of Flensburg

The result of the election held 6 May 2018 were as follows:

Party	Votes	%	±	Seats	±
Christian Democratic Union (CDU)	5,233	19.4	▼2.7	8	▼2
Alliance 90/The Greens (Grüne)	5,088	18.8	▲6.3	8	▲3
Social Democratic Party (SPD)	4,930	18.2	▼2.5	8	▼1
South Schleswig Voters' Association (SSW)	4,756	17.6	▼1.4	8	±0
We in Flensburg (WiF)	2,320	8.6	▼6.4	4	▼2
Free Democratic Party (FDP)	2,087	7.7	▲3.6	3	▲1
The Left (Die Linke)	2,021	7.5	▲3.8	3	▲1
Flensburg Votes! (FLW)	599	2.2	▼0.7	1	±0
Valid votes	27,034	98.9			
Invalid votes	288	1.1			
Total	27,322	100.0		43	±0
Electorate/voter turnout	76,827	35.6	▼0.3		
Source: City of Flensburg

== Coat of arms ==
Flensburg's coat of arms shows in gold above blue and silver waves rising to the left a six-sided red tower with a blue pointed roof, breaking out of which, one above the other, are the two lions of Schleswig and Denmark; above is a red shield with the silver Holsatian nettle leaf on it. The town's flag is blue, overlaid with the coat of arms in colour.

The lions symbolize Schleswig, and the nettle leaf Holstein, thus expressing the town's unity with these two historic lands. The tower recalls Flensburg's old town rights and the old castle that was the town's namesake (Burg means "castle"). The waves refer to the town's position on the Flensburg Fjord.

The coat of arms was granted the town by King Wilhelm II of Prussia in 1901, and once again in modified, newly approved form on 19 January 1937 by Schleswig-Holstein's High President (Oberpräsident).

== Economy and infrastructure ==
=== Energy ===
The town has a well-established Combined Heat and Power and District Heating scheme, installed between 1970 and 1980. It is owned by the town.

=== Transport ===
West of Flensburg runs the A 7 Autobahn, leading north to the Danish border, whence it continues as European route E45. Federal Highways (Bundesstraßen) B 200 and B 199 also pass through the municipal area.

The town's airport Flensburg-Schäferhaus is located 7 km (4 mi) south west of Flensburg. It only supports general aviation with no commercial airline service scheduled. The nearest commercial airports are Billund Airport in Denmark, located 130 km (81 mi) north and Hamburg Airport, also located 145 km (90 mi) south west of the town.

Local transport is provided by several buslines, including Aktiv Bus GmbH and Allgemeinen Flensburger Autobus Gesellschaft (AFAG). They all operate on an integrated fare system within the Flensburg transport community (Verkehrsgemeinschaft Flensburg). They also all subscribe to the Schleswig-Holstein tariff system, whereby anyone travelling from anywhere in Schleswig-Holstein or Hamburg may use Flensburg buses free to connect with their final destinations. This works both ways: a rider boarding any bus in Flensburg need only name a destination anywhere in Schleswig-Holstein or Hamburg, pay the fare, and travel to that destination on one ticket.

The Flensburg station opened in 1927 south of the Old Town. From there, trains run on the main line to Neumünster, Hamburg, and Fredericia, among them some InterCity connections as well as trains serving the line running to Eckernförde and Kiel. Another stop for regional trains to Neumünster is in Flensburg-Weiche. The stretch of line to Niebüll has been out of service since 1981, efforts to open it again notwithstanding. The secondary line to Husum and lesser lines to Kappeln and Satrup no longer exist. The tramway, which opened in 1881 to horse-drawn trams, was electrified in 1906, and at one point ran four lines, was replaced by buses in 1973.

=== Media ===
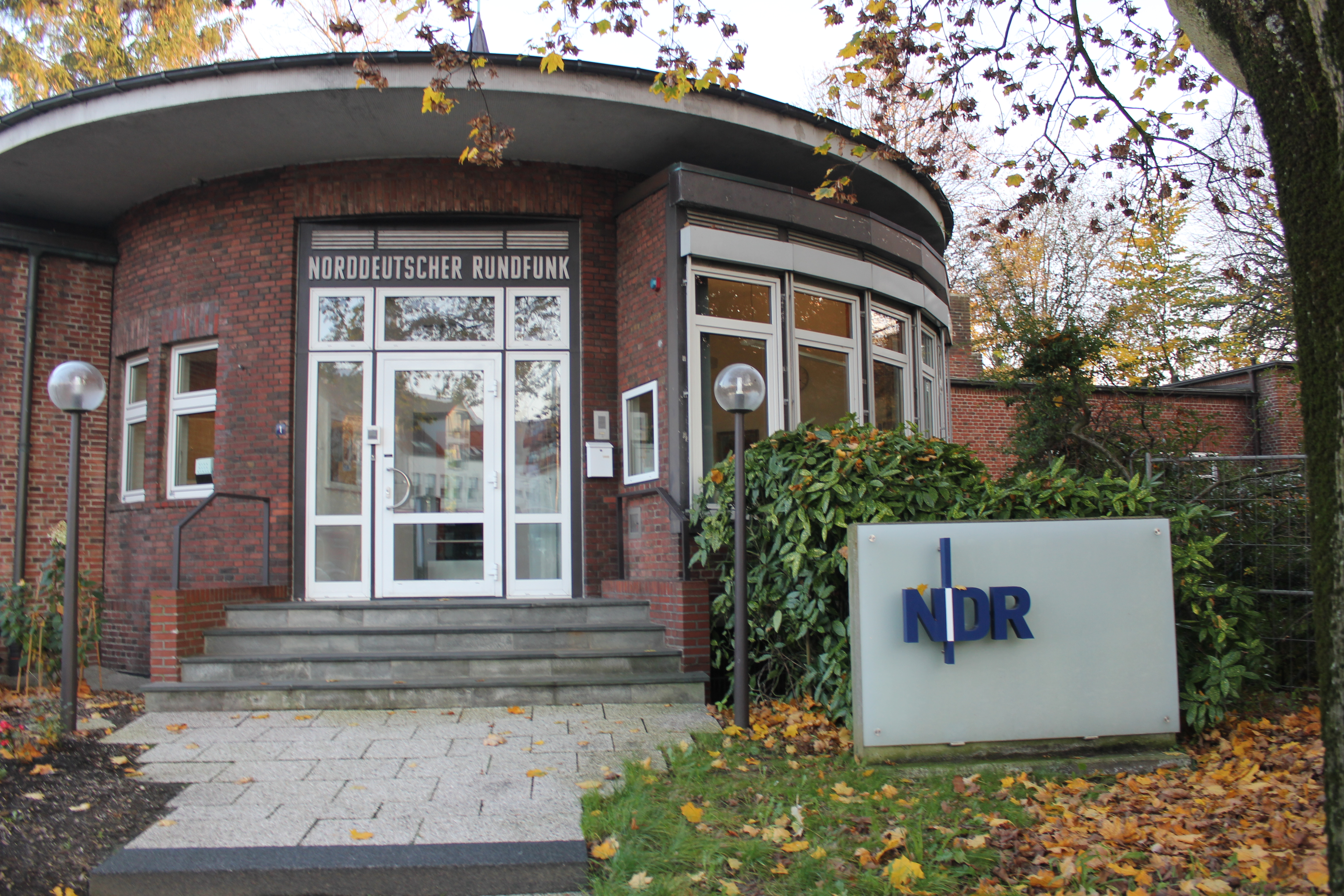
NDR-Studio in Flensburg

In Flensburg, the Flensburger Tageblatt, from the Schleswig-Holsteinischer Zeitungsverlag (newspaper publisher) is published daily, as is the bilingual (German and Danish) Flensborg Avis. There are also two weekly advertising flyers, MoinMoin (named for a common regional greeting) and Wochenschau (Newsweek) as well as an illustrated town paper (Flensburg Journal), the Flensburg "campus newspaper" and a town magazine (Partout). Norddeutscher Rundfunk (NDR) runs one of its oldest studios near the Deutsches Haus. Flensburg is the site of a number of radio transmission facilities: on the Fuchsberg in the community of Engelsby, Norddeutscher Rundfunk runs a transmission facility for VHF, television and medium wave. A cage aerial is mounted on a 215-metre-high (705 ft) guyed, earthed steel-lattice mast. This transmitter is successor to the Flensburg transmitter through which Germany's surrender was announced on 8 May 1945.

The broadcasting tower on the Fuchsberg is used for the programmes of Norddeutscher Rundfunk and Danmarks Radio while the countrywide VHF radio programmes of R.SH, delta radio, Deutschlandfunk and Deutschlandradio air from the Flensburg-Freienwill tower.

Flensburg has no local transmitter of its own because Schleswig-Holstein's state broadcasting laws allow only transmitters that broadcast statewide. From 1993 to 1996, "Radio Flensburg" tried to establish a local Flensburg radio station by using a local transmitter just across the border in Denmark, but it had to be shut down, owing to the Danish transmitter's own financial problems. Since October 2006, Radio Flensburg has broadcast as internet radio.

The "Offener Kanal" ("Open Channel") shows programmes made by local citizens seven days a week, mostly in the evenings, and can also be seen on cable television.

=== Public institutions ===
Flensburg is home to the following institutions:

- Handwerkskammer Flensburg (Chamber of Skilled Crafts)
- IHK Flensburg (Chamber of Trade and Industry)
- Kraftfahrt-Bundesamt (federal government office for road traffic)

=== Education ===
- University of Flensburg has about 6,000 students as of 2019/20. Founded in 1946 as a pedagogical college, it became a university in 1994. Unlike the much larger Kiel University, it is not a full university; theology, medicine, law and some other programs are not offered here. But it does have the right to confer doctorates.
- Flensburg University of Applied Sciences is a Fachhochschule with more than 3,000 students. Its origins lie in a royal steamship machinist school, which was established in 1886. Over time, it developed into a ship's engineers' school. From this grew the "Fachhochschule for Technology", which was converted into the Fachhochschule Flensburg in 1973. At this time the economics program was introduced. In May 2016, the university decided to change its name to Flensburg University of Applied Sciences.
- Marineschule Mürwik (Naval Academy at Mürwik), the main educational establishment for all German Navy officers.
- Flensburger Volkshochschule (German Folk high school)
- Voksenundervisningen (Danish)

Also in Flensburg is a complete range of training and professional schools, including a number of Danish ones. Flensburg is home to Schleswig-Holstein's Central State Library, a university library, a town bookshop and the Danish Central Library for South Schleswig, which offers not only intensive courses in Danish, but also, with its "Slesvigsk samling" collection, a vast repository of unique material about the border area's history and culture. Flensburg has an extensive town archive. The Danish minority's archive is housed at the Danish Central Library.

== Culture ==
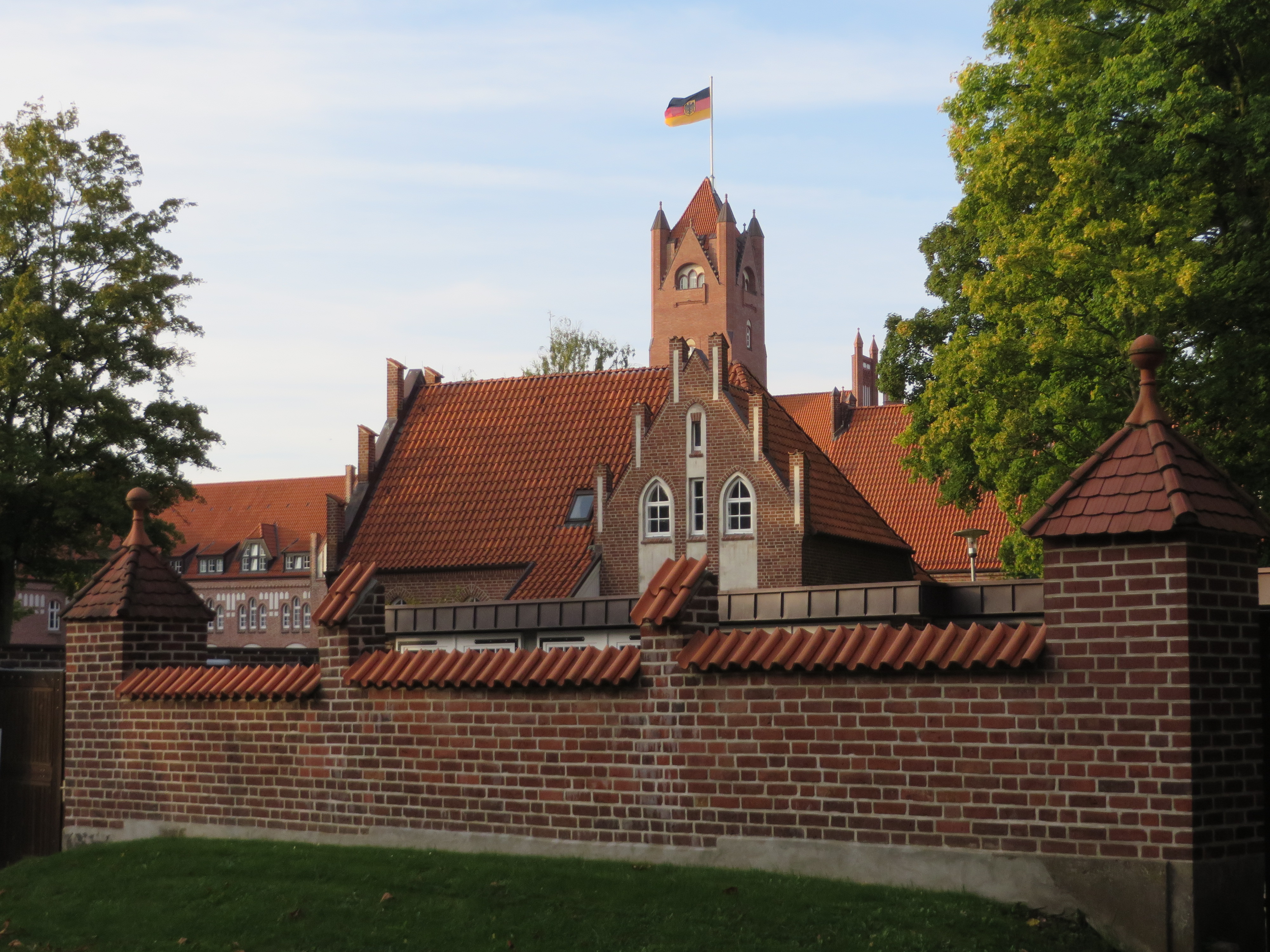
The Naval Academy at Mürwik, a late castle building which is still in use

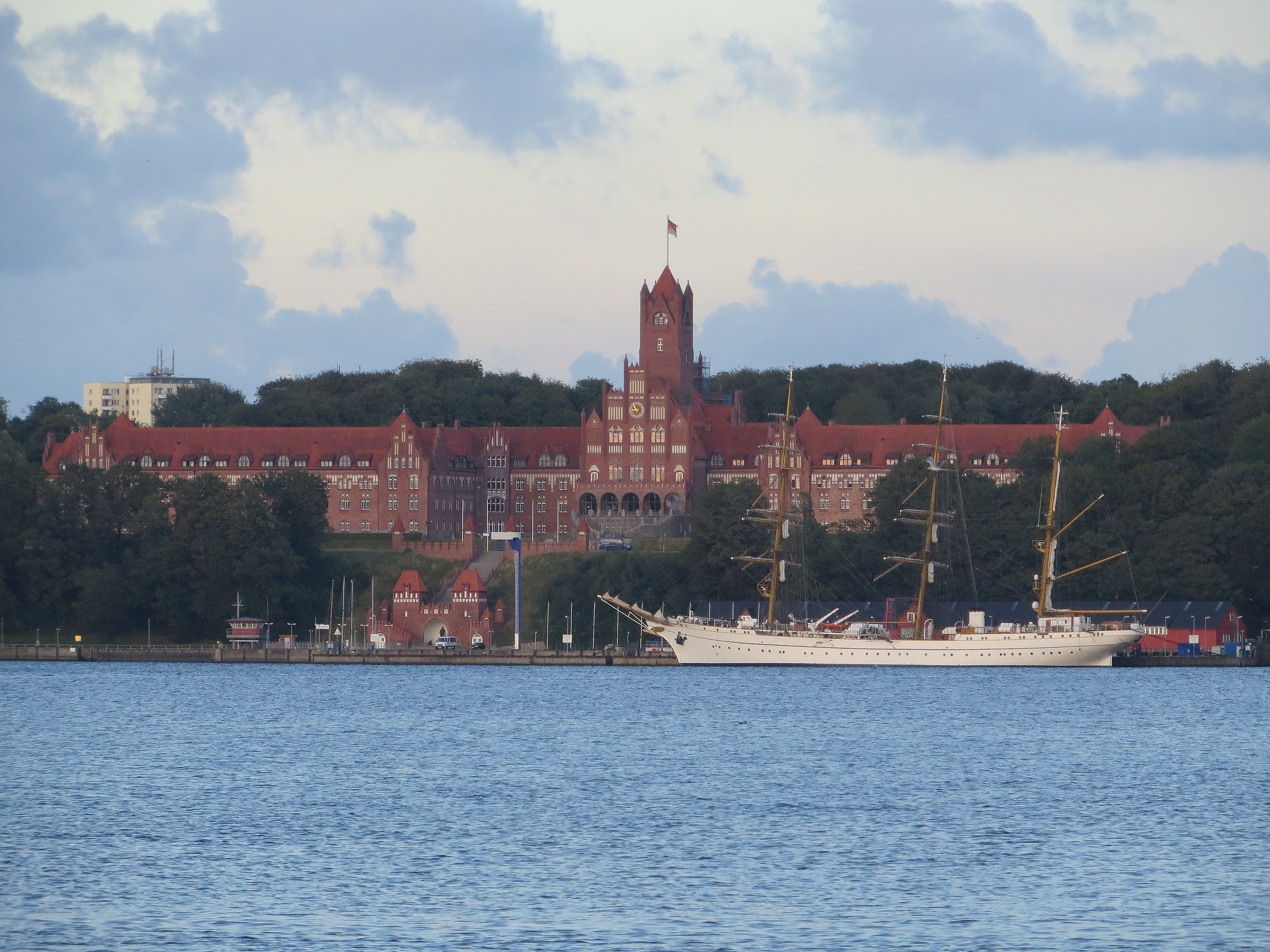
The Gorch Fock on the port of the Naval Academy at Mürwik

=== Theatre ===
- Schleswig-Holsteinisches Landestheater (at the Stadttheater) and Symphony Orchestra
- Niederdeutsche Bühne der Stadt Flensburg (Low German Stage of the city of Flensburg)
- Det Lille Teater (Danish theatre)
- Theaterwerkstatt Pilkentafel (Theatre Workshop)
- Orpheus-Theater

=== Archives and libraries ===
- Town Archive, a very comprehensive collection, at the town hall
- Dansk Centralbibliotek for Sydslesvig, with archive of the Danish minority and Schleswig book collection
- Town Library
- State Central Library and Zentrale Hochschulbibliothek (Central College Library)

=== Museums ===
- Museumsberg – Museum for artistic and cultural history
- Schifffahrtsmuseum – Museum for shipping and shipbuilding
- Rummuseum – History of the "Rum Town" of Flensburg.
- Naturwissenschaftliches Museum – Animal and plant worlds of northern Schleswig-Holstein
- Museumshafen – Private initiative for maintaining old traditional working boats mainly from the Baltics (Segelschiffe)
- Museumswerft – Shipbuilding (sail) of bygone centuries. The place also has a children's boatyard.
- Fischereimuseum – Initiative of the fishery association, lies on the old fishery harbour
- Phänomenta – For experiencing and understanding nature and technology
- Salondampfer "Alexandra" – passenger steamer built 1908. The Alexandra regularly makes small trips in the Flensburg Förde (bay)
- Klassische Yachten Flensburg – classic yacht harbour. Private initiative to present classic yachts typical of the Baltics.
- Gerichtshistorische Sammlung – a collection of legal history at the Flensburg State Court
- Bergmühle – Association for maintaining the historic windmill from 1792
- Johannesburger Heimatstube – Documents, pictures and writings from East Prussia

=== Regular events ===
- May/June: Rumregatta (yearly)
- May/June: Danske Årsmøder (yearly)
- June/December: Campusfete (twice yearly)
- June: Rote-Straße-Fest (yearly)
- July: Dampf-Rundum (every two years)
- July/August: Flensburger Hofkultur (yearly summer cultural programme)
- August: Flensburger Tummelum (Old Town Festival) (every two years)
- October: Apfelfahrt des Museumshafen (yearly)
- October: "Flensburg Shortfilmfestival" (yearly)
- December: Christmas market (yearly)

== Cityscape ==
=== Buildings ===
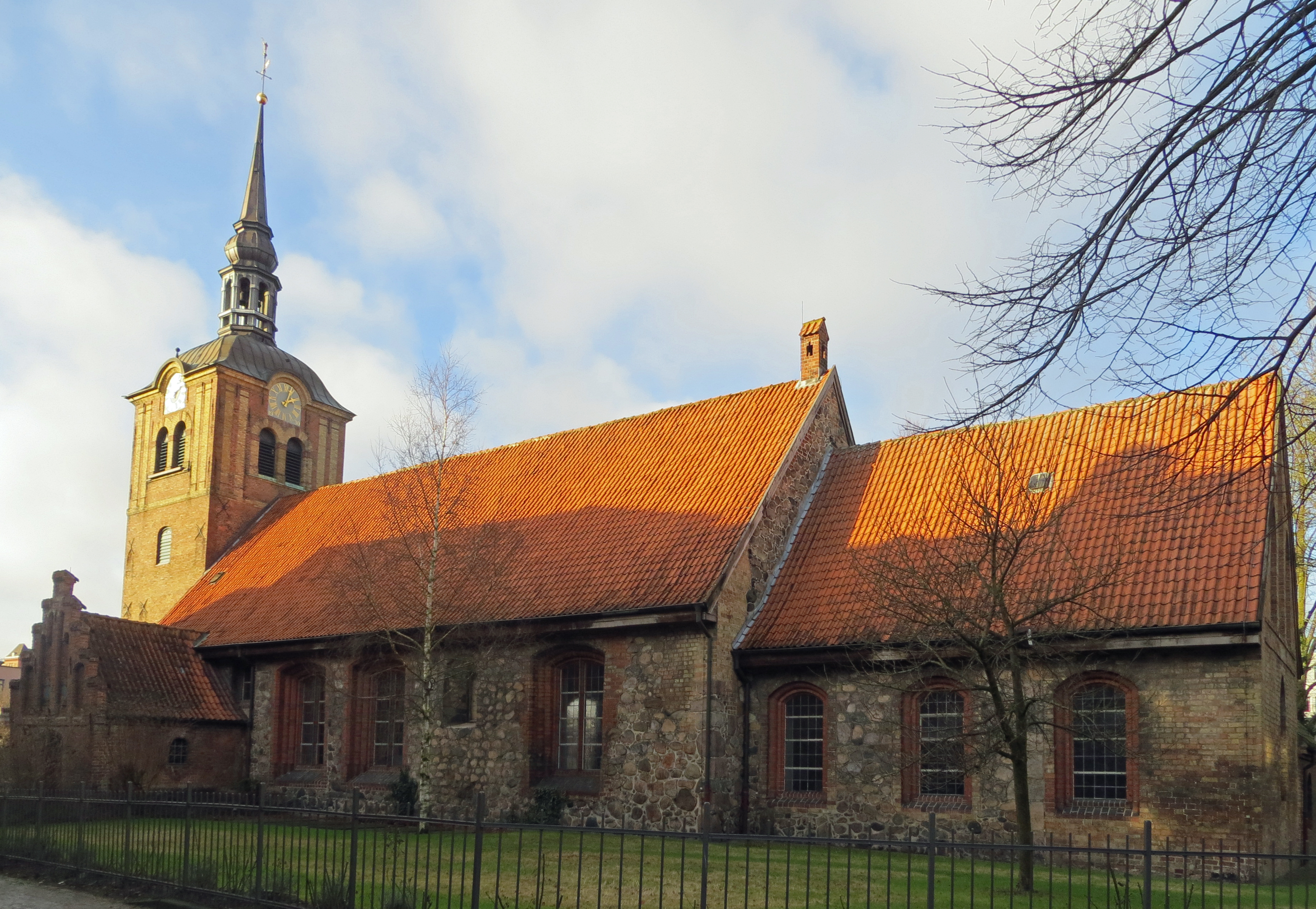
The Johanniskirche (Johannischurch)

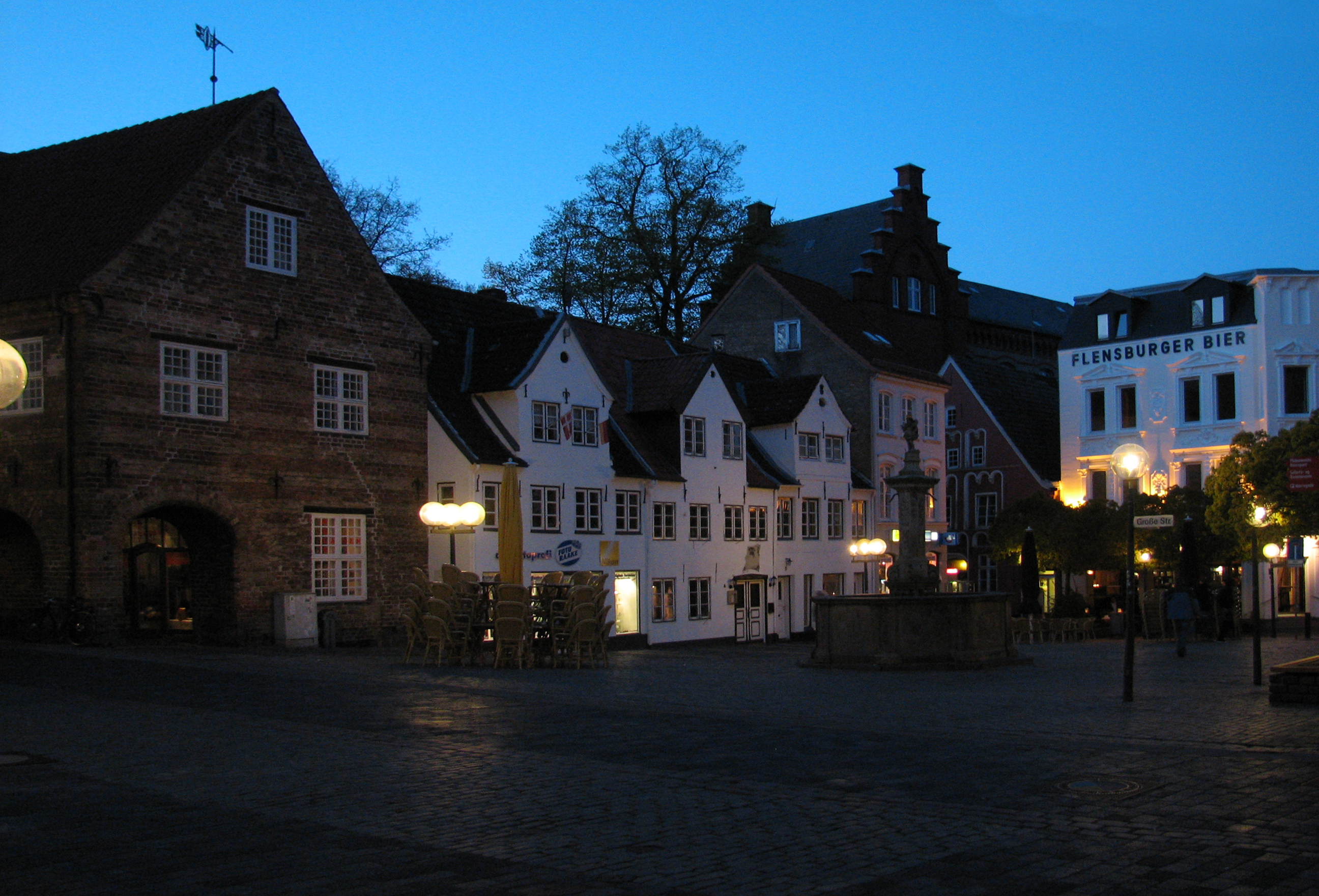
Nordermarkt; also visible is Große Straße

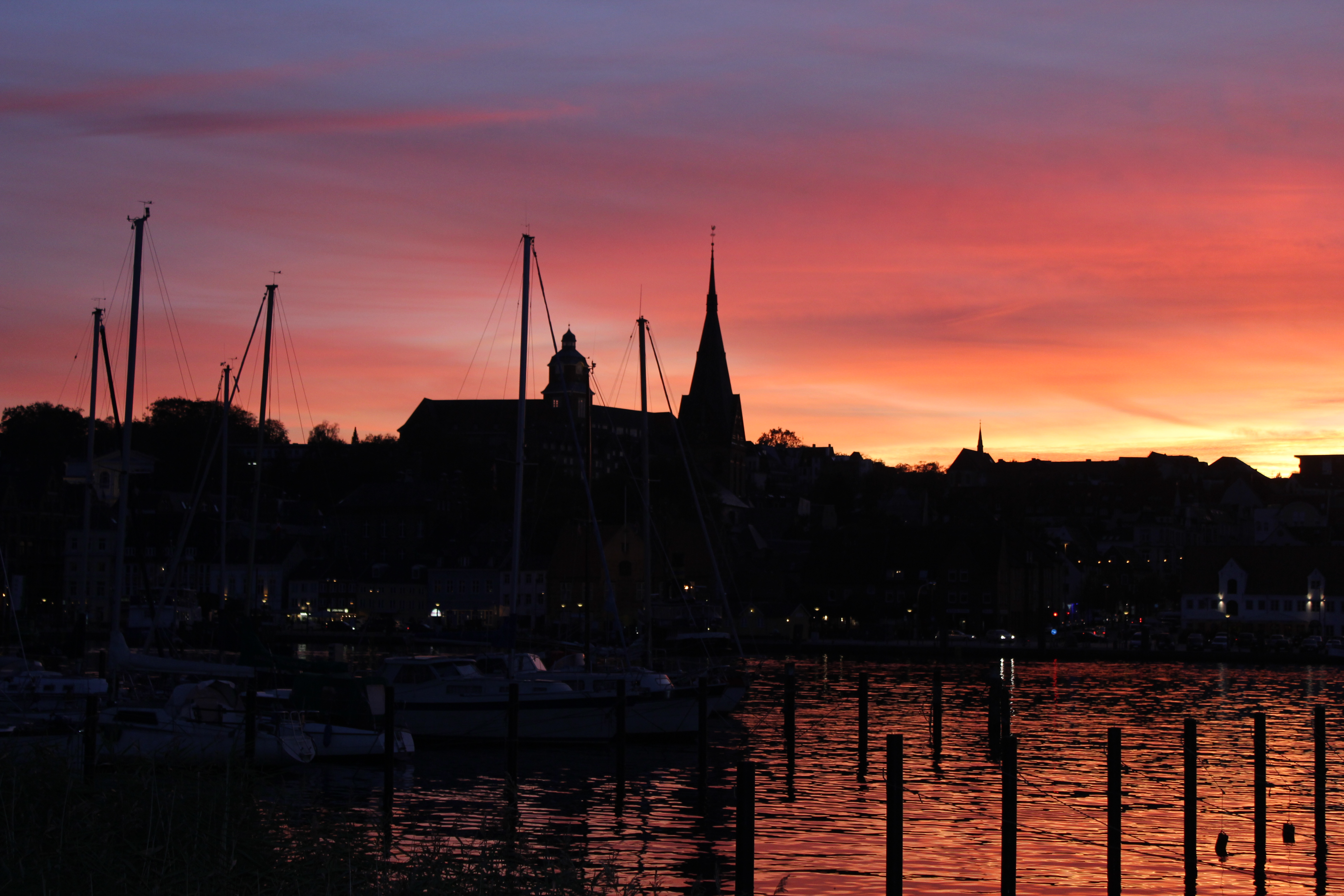
Harbour of Flensburg at dawn

Flensburg has a well-preserved Old Town featuring numerous historical buildings and landmarks from past centuries. The construction boom during the Imperial era resulted in partial reconstruction of the Old Town, which nevertheless retained its traditional structure.

Largely spared from destruction during the Second World War, Flensburg, like many other German cities, later pursued urban renewal policies that favored modern redevelopment over preservation. Financial constraints limited the extent of these measures; however, before the policy was abandoned in the late 1970s, numerous historic buildings in the northern and eastern sections of the Old Town were demolished and replaced with contemporary structures. Despite these losses, Flensburg retains a compact and well-preserved Old Town.

- Johanniskirche (Flensburg) Johanniskirche (Johannischurch), town's oldest church in the innertown, 12th century
- Marienkirche (Flensburg) Marienkirche, High Gothic, Baroque additions, tower from 1885, well decorated
- Nikolaikirche (Flensburg) Nikolaikirche, Gothic main church, famous organ design by Hinrich Ringeringk
- Heiliggeistkirche (Flensburg) Heiliggeistkirche (Danish: Helligåndskirken), former chapel of the Hospital zum Heiligen Geist
- Franziskanerkloster Flensburg Franziskanerkloster, ruins from 1263
- Nordertor, a gate, and the town's landmark
- Kompagnietor another gate, built in 1602, shipping company and harbour gate
- Alt-Flensburger Haus, where the Eckener brothers' parents lived, Norderstraße 8
- Flensborghus, a former orphanage, today seat of the Danish minority, Norderstraße 76
- Many merchants' houses running from the main streets Holm-Große Straße-Norderstraße, the town's greatest architectural attraction
- Südermarkt 9 (market) with the town's oldest house
- Nordermarkt (market) with the Schrangen (market hall) and Neptunbrunnen (fountain)
- Rote Straße with nice craftsmen's houses
- Jürgenstraße with the Gängeviertel ("Warren Neighbourhood", i.e. with very dense building and narrow streets), former suburb.
- Oluf-Samson-Gang, picturesque lane with little half-timbered houses, Flensburg's historic red light district.
- Row of warehouses
- Ship bridge (Schiffbrücke), a long quay on the harbour
- Scanty ruins of the town wall, at the Nikolaikirche and at the Franciscan friary
- Bergmühle and Johannismühle (mills)
- Deutsches Haus, gathering and event hall in the town core
- Flensburg station (Main Railway Station), completed in 1929
- Town Hall, seventeen-floor cube from 1964, in 1997 totally renovated
- Altes Gymnasium, built in 1914, Flensburg's oldest Gymnasium, founded in 1566 as "Gymnasium trilingue" (Latin, Greek, Hebrew)
- Duborg Skolen, Flensburg's Danish Gymnasium, as well as other school buildings

=== Lost buildings ===
- Gertrudenkirche, church in the Ramsharde (former neighbourhood where Neustadt now stands), folded after the Reformation, graveyard maintained until 1822
- Jürgen-Hospital, abandoned after the Reformation, the new St. Jürgen-Kirche stands there today
- Old Town Hall, 15th century, demolished in 1883
- Government building, appellate court and house of the estates, from 1850 to 1864 political centre of the Duchy of Schleswig, gave way to a department store in 1964
- Speicher Johannisstraße 78 (warehouse), bombed in 1945
- Town fortifications

=== Others ===
- Flensburg Fjord
- Old Cemetery, parkland with noteworthy grave markers from the 19th century
- Christiansenspark, remnant of a very big landscape park
- Volkspark in the town's east end
- Marienhölzung (Danish Frueskov), woods in the town's west end

== Notable people ==
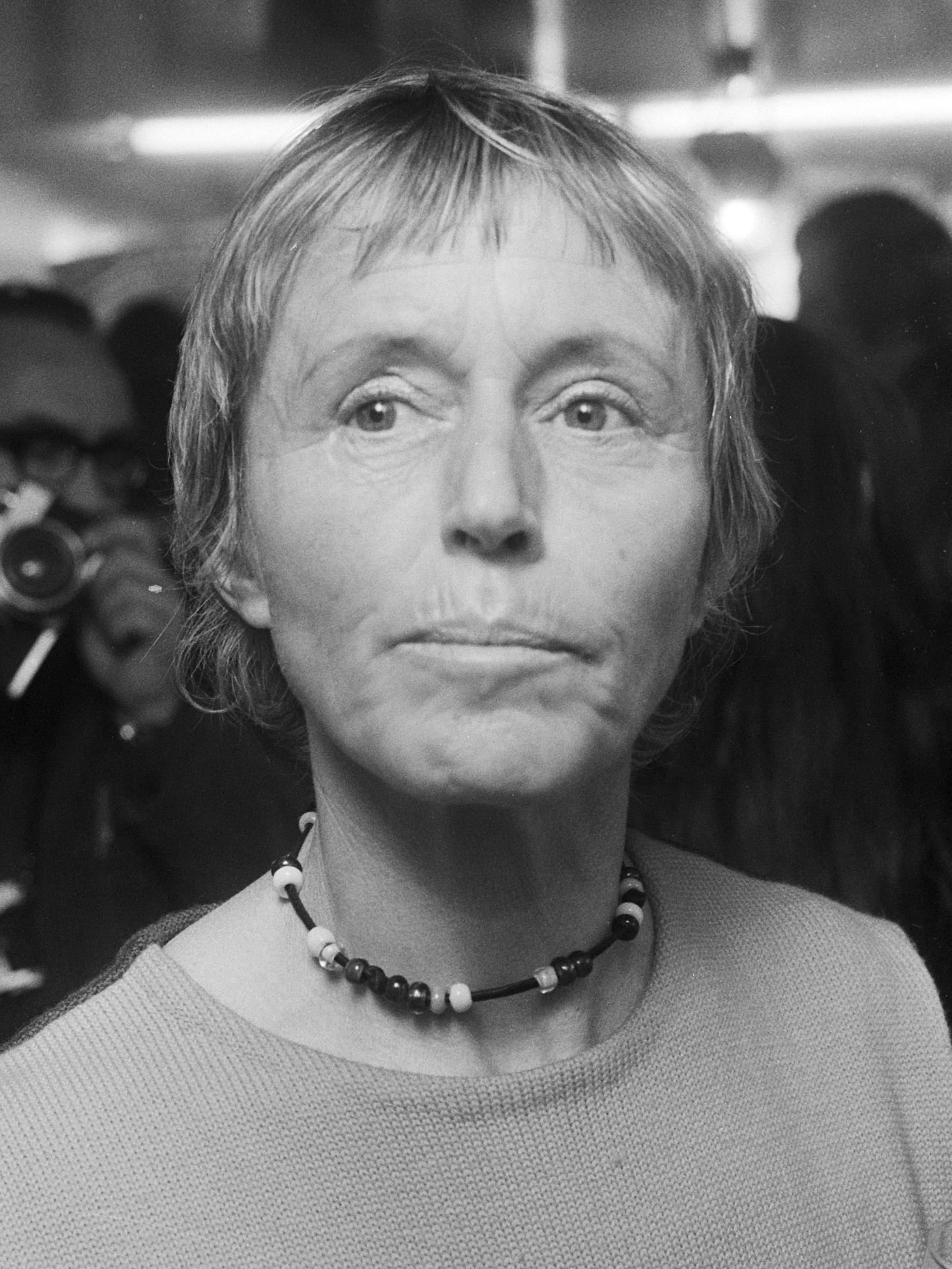
Beate Uhse, 1971

=== Honorary citizens ===
The town of Flensburg has bestowed honorary citizenship upon the following persons, listed chronologically:

- 1851: Friedrich Ferdinand Tillisch, Minister for the Duchy of Schleswig
- 1857: Christian Rønnenkamp, salesman and shipowner
- 1867: Edwin Freiherr von Manteuffel, Prussian King's Governor
- 1872: Karl von Wrangel, General
- 1895: Otto Fürst von Bismarck, Reich Chancellor
- 1911: Friedrich Wilhelm Selck, Commercial Councillor
- 1917: Heinrich Schuldt, Town Councillor
- 1924: Hugo Eckener, Aviation pioneer
- 1930: Hermann Bendix Todsen, Oberbürgermeister
- 1999: Beate Uhse-Rotermund, aviator and businesswoman

=== Special Resident ===
- Isted Lion (unveiled 1862) a war monument, originally in Flensburg, then Berlin, then Copenhagen, now resident again in Flensburg

=== Born in Flensburg ===
==== The arts ====
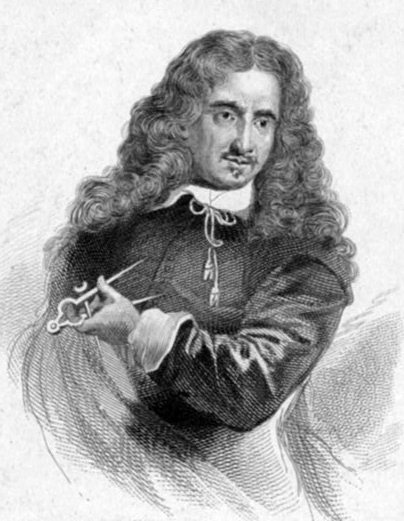
Caius Gabriel Cibber

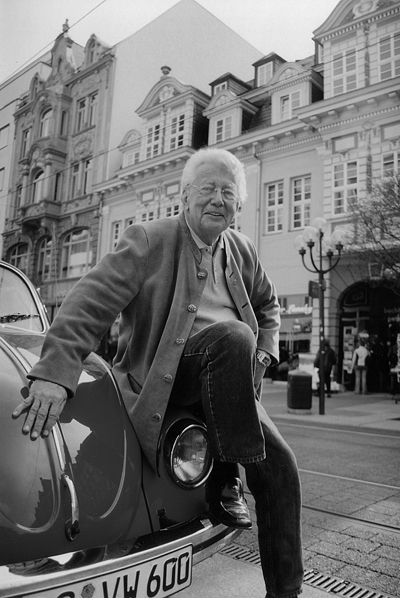
Dieter Thomas Heck

- Melchior Lorck (1526/27 – 1583), a renaissance painter, draughtsman and printmaker
- Heinrich Jansen (1625–1667), Danish Baroque painter, court painter to Frederick III of Denmark
- Caius Gabriel Cibber (1630–1700), Danish sculptor, appointed carver to the king's closet by William III of England
- Hermann Vogel (1856–1918), French painter and illustrator, from the Duchy of Schleswig
- Adolf Strodtmann (1829–1879), a German poet, journalist, translator and literary historian.
- Ludwig Dettmann (1865–1944), a German impressionist painter
- Hans Christiansen (1866–1945), artistic craftsman and Art Nouveau founder
- Elvira Madigan (1867–1889), stage name of a Danish tightrope walker and trick rider, whose illicit affair and dramatic death were the subject of a 1967 Swedish film
- Ella Heide (1871–1956), Danish painter, painted in Skagen from 1908
- Wilhelm von Brincken (1881–1946), American character actor and German spy during WW I
- Emmy Hennings (1885–1948), writer, performer, poet and dadaist
- Dieter Thomas Heck (born 1937), German television presenter, singer and actor
- Pippa Steel (1948–1992), British actress
- Peter Lund (born 1965), a theatre director and author

==== Music ====
- Carla Spletter (1911–1953), German operatic soprano
- Frank Dostal (born 1945), German songwriter, music producer, and singer with the rock band The Rattles
- Christian Broecking (born 1957), musicologist, music critic, columnist, producer and author
- Andreas Delfs (born 1959), music director of the Rochester Philharmonic Orchestra
- Dorothea Röschmann (born 1967), opera soprano
- DJ Koze (born 1972), German DJ and music producer
- Kim Frank (born 1982), singer and actor

==== Science and religion ====
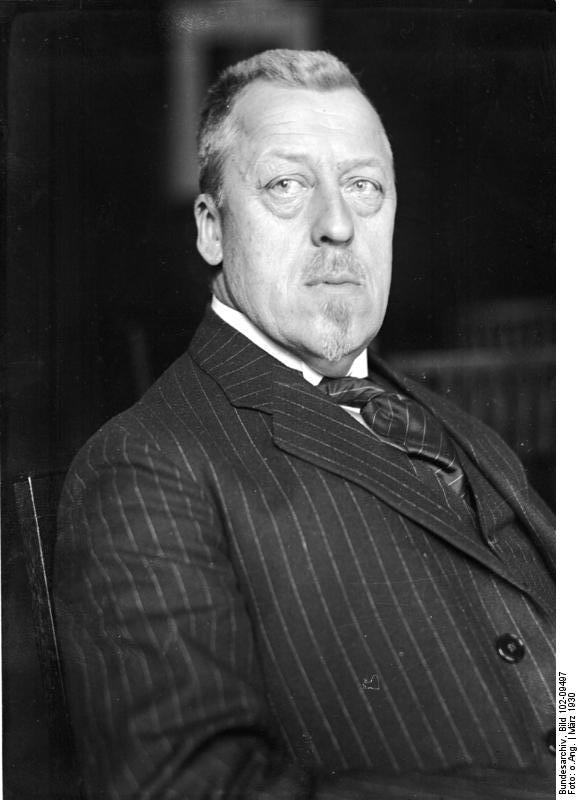
Hugo Eckener, 1930

- Lütke Namens (1497–1574), the last Franciscan friar in Flensburg and critic of the Reformation
- Thomas Fincke (1561–1656), Danish mathematician, physicist, and professor at the University of Copenhagen
- Heinrich Harries (1762–1802), German Protestant pastor from the Duchy of Schleswig
- Hans Lassen Martensen (1808–1884), Danish bishop and academic
- Theodor von Jürgensen (1840–1907), internist
- Hugo Eckener (1868–1954), pioneer of German Zeppelin aviation
- Carl Wilhelm Otto Werner (1879–1936), German physician, after whom Werner syndrome, a form of progeria, was named
- Hans Asmussen (1898–1968), German Evangelical and Lutheran theologian
- Lorenz Magaard (born 1934), German-American mathematician and oceanographer
- Tim Clausen (born 1969), structural biologist in Vienna, studies pyridoxal phosphate enzymes

==== Political and public service ====
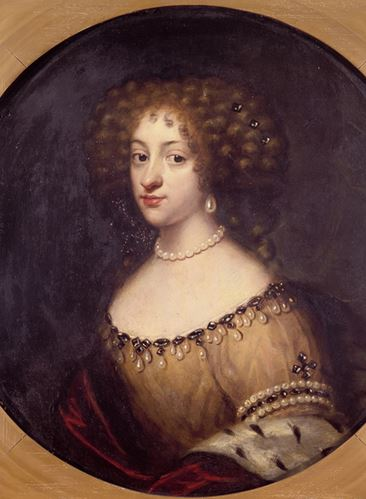
Anna Sophia of Denmark

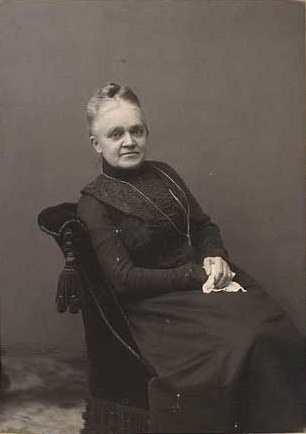
Marie Kruse

- Hans Nansen (1598–1667), Danish statesman and tradesman, travelled to the White Sea, northern Russia and Iceland
- Johan Lorensen (ca.1640–1702), Governor-General of The Danish West Indies
- Christian V (1646–1699), king of Denmark and Norway
- Princess Anna Sophie of Denmark (1647–1717), daughter of King Frederick III of Denmark
- Frederik Krag (1655–1728), Danish nobleman, senior civil servant and Governor-General of Norway
- Johannes Moller (1661–1725), Danish pietist and headmaster
- Georg Waitz (1813–1886), German historian, politician, and disciple of Leopold von Ranke
- Marie Kruse (1842–1923), Danish schoolteacher specializing in educating girls
- Friedrich von Scholtz (1851–1927), general, served in the East and the Balkans during WWI
- Nicholas Asmussen (1871–1941), Flensburg-born Ontario building contractor and political figure
- Peter Voss (1897–1976), SS-Oberscharführer, commander of the crematoria and gas chambers at Auschwitz
- Hans von Luck (1911–1997), army colonel and author of the book Panzer Commander
- Kay Nehm (born 1941), German lawyer, Attorney General of Germany
- Wolfgang Börnsen (born 1942), CDU politician, member of the Bundestag
- Jürgen Storbeck (born 1946), director of Europol
- Bärbel Höhn (born 1952), German politician, member of the Bundestag
- Simon Faber (born 1968), German politician, Lord Mayor of Flensburg
- Thomas Jepsen (born 1973), CDU politician
- Uta Wentzel (born 1979), CDU politician

==== Sport ====
- Charles Meyer (1868–1931), Danish racing cyclist
- Haide Klüglein (born 1939), swimmer
- Kristian Poulsen (born 1975), Danish racing driver
- Sascha Görres (born 1980), footballer in USA
- Kolja Afriyie (born 1982), football defender
- Niels Hansen (born 1983), football midfielder
- Pierre Becken (born 1987), footballer

== Twin towns – sister cities ==
Flensburg is twinned with:

- Carlisle, United Kingdom
- Neubrandenburg, Germany
- Słupsk, Poland

== See also ==
- Flensburg, Minnesota
- Isted Lion, in German known as the Flensburger Löwe
- Chronicle of the Expulsion of the Grayfriars#Chapter 1 Concerning the Friary in Flensborg
- SG Flensburg-Handewitt
- Durham, England, same latitude
