= Theodor von Jürgensen =

German doctor

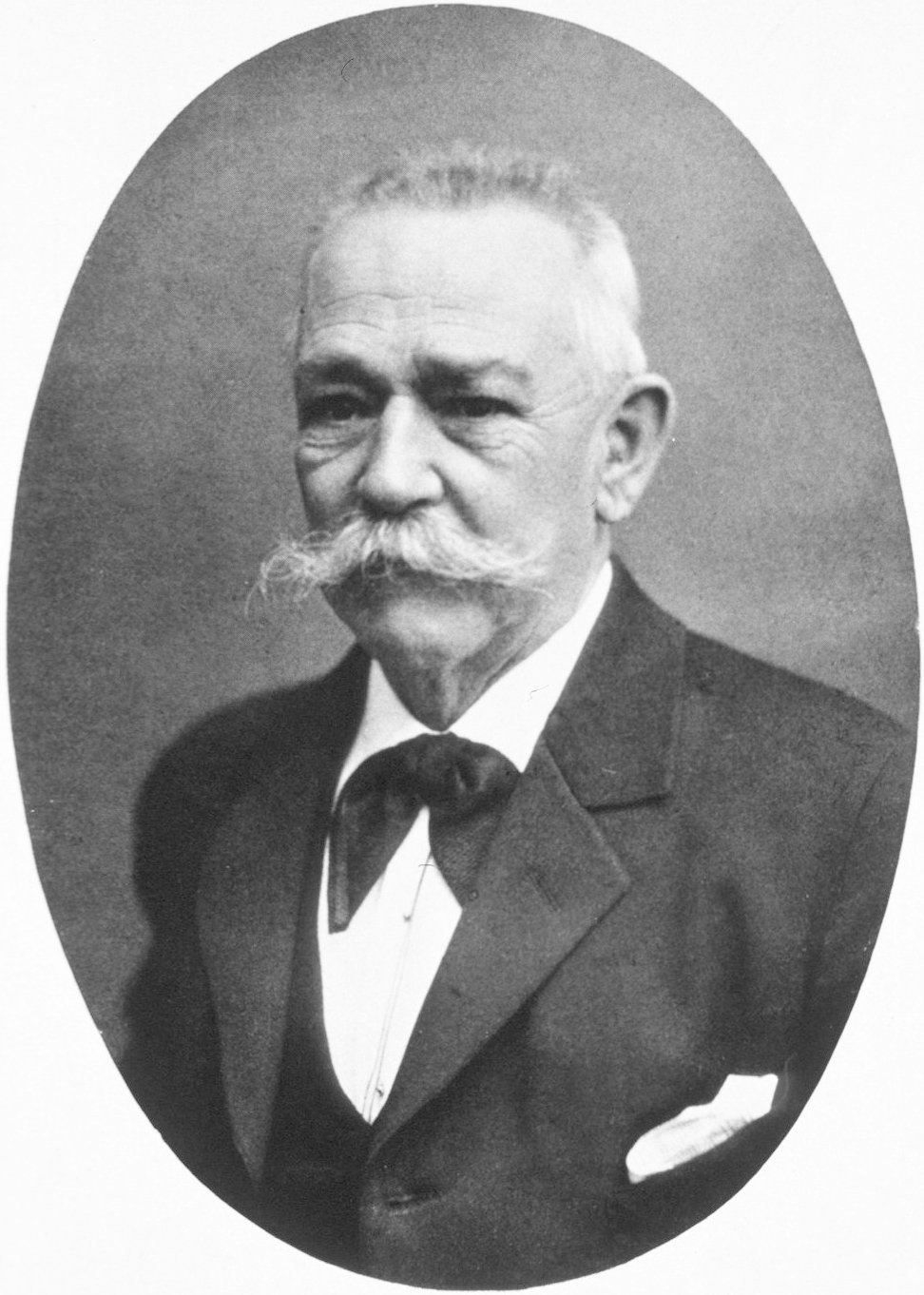
- Born: 11 April 1840; Flensburg, Duchy of Schleswig
- Died: 8 March 1907 (aged 66); Tübingen, Germany
- Occupation: Doctor

Theodor von Jürgensen (11 April 1840 – 8 May 1907) was a German internist who was a native of Flensburg, Schleswig-Holstein.

He studied medicine at the Universities of Kiel, Breslau and Tübingen, earning his doctorate in 1863. Afterwards he was a lecturer in Kiel, where in 1869 he became an associate professor and head of its medical clinic. In 1873, he became a full professor of general therapy and director of the local policlinic at Tübingen, a position he maintained until his death in 1907.

Jürgensen specialized in research of cardiovascular disease, and is remembered for his work involving treatment of pneumonia and measles.

== Selected publications ==
- Klinische Studien über die Behandlung des Abdominaltyphus mittels des kalten Wassers (Studies on the treatment of abdominal typhus using cold water); (1866)
- Die Körperwärme des gesunden Menschen (Body temperature of healthy persons); (1873)
- Kruppöse Pneumonie Katarrhalpneumonie, in Hugo Wilhelm von Ziemssen's "Handbuch der speciellen Pathologie und Therapie", (1874)
- Antiphlogistische Heilmethoden, Blutentziehungen Transfusion, in Ziemssen's "Handbuch der allgemeinen Therapie", (1880)
- Kruppöse Pneumonie: Beobachtungen aus der Tübinger Poliklinik (Croupous pneumonia: Observations from the Tübingen Polyclinic); (1883)
- Mitteilungen aus der Tübinger Poliklinik, (1886)
- Lehrbuch der speciellen Pathologie und Therapie (Textbook of special pathology and therapy); (1893)
- Acute Exantheme: Allgemeines, Masern, Scharlach, Rötheln, Varicellen (Acute exanthema: measles, scarlet fever, rubella, varicella); (1894–96)
- Erkrankungen der Kreislaufsorgane, Insufficienz, Schwäche, des Herzens (Diseases of the circulatory organs: Insufficiency, weakness of the heart); (1899)
