= Thomas Jepsen =

German politician

Thomas Jepsen (born 1973 in Flensburg) is a German politician of the CDU. He was briefly member of the German Bundestag in 2017 and is, since 2022, member of the State parliament of Schleswig-Holstein.

== Life ==
He was born on 19 March 1973 in Flensburg and got his German high school diploma, Abitur, in 1992. In the following years, he trained as a banker and served in the Technisches Hilfswerk. He worked at the Sparkasse until he became independent in 2003. He has two children.

== Politics ==
Jepsen joined the CDU in 1995. From 2011 to 2017, he was a member of the district parliament of Schleswig-Flensburg. In July 2017, Jepsen took Sabine Sütterlin-Waack's seat in the German federal parliament, the Bundestag, following her resignation. He was in the Bundestag until the next federal Election in the same year, in which he did not seek re-election to the Bundestag. He won the 2022 election of the State parliament of Schleswig-Holstein, and is currently serving there.
