= Simon Faber =

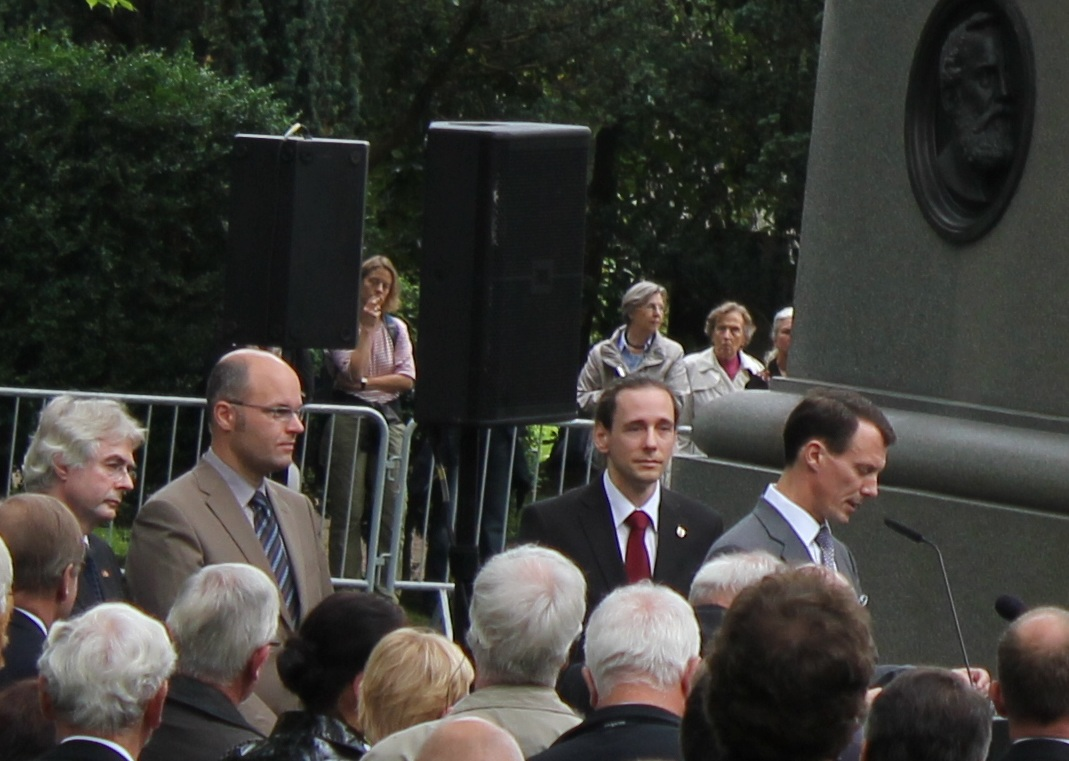
Flensburg Lion - Reinauguration - Michael Zenner, Simon Faber, Christian Dewanger and Prince Joachim of Denmark.jpg

Simon Faber (born September 11, 1968 in Flensburg) is a German politician (Südschleswigscher Wählerverband) and was Lord Mayor of Flensburg between January 15, 2011 and January 15, 2017.

== Early life ==
Faber graduated 1987 from the Danish highschool in Flensburg, having achieved his Abitur. After military service, he studied at the University of Aarhus and at The Royal Academy of Music in the Danish town Aarhus. Having worked for a Danish publisher for some time, he became the director's intendant of Danmarks Radio radio orchestra from 2002 to 2004.

Since 2004 he has been living in Flensburg again. In 2010 he was cultural policy consultant for the Danish minority in Germany at the Danish Parliament.

In May 2010, the Südschleswigsche Wählerverband nominated him as a candidate for the mayoral election of Flensburg on October 31, 2010. In the first round of election he was second to Elfi Heesch (CDU und Bündnis 90/Die Grünen, 25.1%) with 19.4% of the votes and before Thede Boysen (SPD, 18.2%). During the second round of election on November 21, 2010, he won (with 54.8%) through Elfi Heesch (45.2%).

Faber succeeded previous lord mayor Klaus Tscheuschner on January 15, 2011 who didn't run for the post again.

== Goals ==
Faber thinks that Flensburg's location at the Danish border is the town's biggest chance. That's why he wants to cooperate with Denmark more than ever before. For example, he argued in favour of the election of Sønderborg as Kulturhauptstadt Europas in 2017, which would have included Sønderjylland (Northern Schleswig) as well as Southern Schleswig, and thus Flensburg. Together with Denmark, he wants to make the region attractive for regional politics again, to prevent the imminent closing of the Flensburg grounds of the Landestheater or the JVA. Apart from that, Faber wants to achieve a „sustainable, transparent strategy for the Stadtwerke“.
