= Peter Voss =

Commander of the Crematoria of Auschwitz-Birkenau

Peter Voss, sometimes misspelled as Foss, Vost or Vast (December 18, 1897 – 1976), was an SS-Oberscharführer, known for his role as a commander of the crematoria and gas chambers at Auschwitz-Birkenau, buildings which were used to gas and burn some 900,000 of the 1.1 million people that were murdered at Auschwitz-Birkenau in Nazi-occupied Poland.

== Life ==
Voss was born in Flensburg, Germany. During the spring and early summer of 1943, the four crematoria at Auschwitz-Birkenau became operational. It was this time that Voss became their commander, thus becoming the first of three people who would be in charge of all four Birkenau crematoria during the history of the camp. Subsequent commanders were SS-Oberscharführer Erich Muhsfeldt and SS-Hauptscharführer Otto Moll.

Voss is frequently mentioned in the memoirs of Sonderkommando member Filip Müller. Müller described him as a stocky man of medium height, with a small, slightly hooked nose and a weakness for alcohol, stating that he displayed "neither the fanaticism nor the zeal" of Otto Moll. Müller stated that Voss' SS training had turned him into an "uncritical and willing tool rather than a fanatically cruel exterminator", and offers the analogy that Voss has two personalities: one where he could be "high-spirited, laughing and joking and talking about trivial things", and another where he would be completely indifferent to "shooting men, women and children one after the other" when required of him.

Müller disclosed that another of Voss' weaknesses was valuables such as gold, diamonds, and currency: these could be sewn into discreet places in his uniform under the pretence that if he left it with a tailor from the Sonderkommando while he was on leave, it would be repaired. According to Müller, Voss knew what was going on, but such behaviour was common among SS men: they were willing to turn a blind eye as long as there was no risk to themselves.

== Hungarian action ==
Voss' tenure ended on May 9, 1944, when SS-Obersturmbannführer Rudolf Höss, beginning his second tour of duty as camp commandant, appointed Otto Moll as chief of the crematoria in preparation for the arrival and destruction of the Jews of Hungary. Voss was placed in charge of Crematoria IV and V.

He died in 1976.
