= Gelting (Amt) =

Coordinates: 54.750°N 9.900°E

Gelting was an Amt ("collective municipality") in the district of Schleswig-Flensburg, in Schleswig-Holstein, Germany. The seat of the Amt was in Gelting. In January 2008, it was merged with the Amt Steinbergkirche to form the Amt Geltinger Bucht.

== Municipalities ==
The Amt Gelting consisted of the following municipalities:

1. Gelting
2. Hasselberg
3. Kronsgaard
4. Maasholm
5. Nieby
6. Pommerby
7. Rabel
8. Rabenholz
9. Stangheck
10. Stoltebüll
