= Kropp (Amt) =

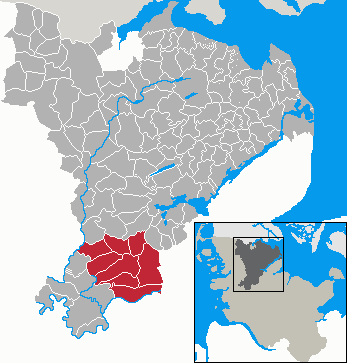
Location of Kropp in Schleswig-Flensburg district

Kropp is a former Amt ("collective municipality") in the district of Schleswig-Flensburg, in Schleswig-Holstein, Germany. The seat of the Amt was in Kropp. On 1 January 2008, it was merged with the Amt Stapelholm to form the Amt Kropp-Stapelholm.

The Amt Kropp consisted of the following municipalities:

- Alt Bennebek (355)
- Börm (764)
- Dörpstedt (549)
- Groß Rheide (1037)
- Klein Bennebek (587)
- Klein Rheide (357)
- Kropp (6416)
- Tetenhusen (945)
