= Stapelholm =

Defunct administrative region of Germany

Coordinates: 54°21′N 9°15′E

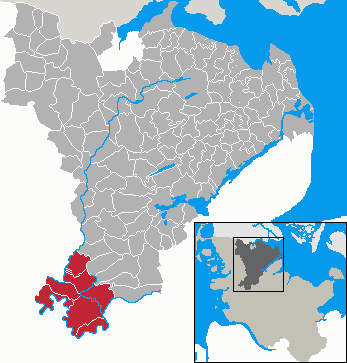
Location of Stapelholm in Schleswig-Flensburg district

Stapelholm was an Amt ("collective municipality") in the district of Schleswig-Flensburg, in Schleswig-Holstein, Germany. It was situated on the north bank of the river Eider, approx. 25 km southwest of Schleswig. The seat of the Amt was in Norderstapel. In January 2008, it was merged with the Amt Kropp to form the Amt Kropp-Stapelholm.

The Amt Stapelholm consisted of the following municipalities:

1. Bergenhusen
2. Erfde
3. Meggerdorf
4. Norderstapel
5. Süderstapel
6. Tielen
7. Wohlde
