= Steinbergkirche (Amt) =

Municipality in Schleswig-Holstein, Germany

Steinbergkirche was an Amt ("collective municipality") in the district of Schleswig-Flensburg, in Schleswig-Holstein, Germany. The seat of the Amt was in Steinbergkirche. In January 2008, it was merged with the Amt Gelting to form the Amt Geltinger Bucht.

The Amt Steinbergkirche consisted of the following municipalities:

1. Ahneby
2. Esgrus
3. Niesgrau
4. Quern
5. Steinberg
6. Steinbergkirche
7. Sterup
