= Kropp (disambiguation) =

Kropp is a town in Schleswig-Flensburg district of Schleswig-Holstein, Germany

Kropp may also refer to:

- Kropp (surname)
- Kropp (Amt), a former collective municipality in Schleswig-Flensburg district of Schleswig-Holstein, Germany
- Kropp-Stapelholm, a collective municipality in Schleswig-Flensburg district of Schleswig-Holstein, Germany
- Palaye Royale, American rock band formed under the name Kropp Circle
