= Rheide =

Rheide may refer to:

- Groß Rheide, a municipality in Schleswig-Holstein, Germany
- Klein Rheide, a municipality in Schleswig-Holstein, Germany

== See also ==
- Rheider Au, a river of Schleswig-Holstein, Germany
- Rheid, a solid material that deforms by viscous flow
