= Kropp (surname) =

Kropp is a German and Dutch surname of multiple possible origins. Notable people with the surname include:

- Andrea Kropp (born 1993), American swimmer
- Cordula Kropp (born 1966), German sociologist
- Darryl Kropp, Canadian politician
- Elisabeth Kropp, German sprint canoeist who competed in the late 1930s
- Georg Kropp (1865–1943), German journalist and polymath
- Göran Kropp (1966–2002), Swedish adventurer and mountaineer
- Jenny Kropp (born 1979), American female beach volleyball
- Lesław Kropp (1936–2013), Polish wrestler
- Lloyd Kropp (1937–2023), American novelist, composer, and educator
- Mary Esther Kropp Dakubu (1938–2016), American linguist based in Ghana
- Paul Kropp (1948–2015), American-born Canadian author, publisher and educator
- Tom Kropp (born 1953), American former professional basketball player
- Tori Kropp, American pregnancy, woman's health, and early parenting expert
- Tyler Kropp (born 2007), Argentine-American basketball player
- William Kropp (born 1990), American professional golfer

== Fictional characters ==
- Protagonist of the Alfred Kropp series

== See also ==
- Kropp (disambiguation)
