= Bergenhus (disambiguation) =

Bergenhus may refer to:

- Bergenhus, a borough of the city of Bergen, Norway
- Bergenhus Fortress, a fortress in the city of Bergen, Norway
- Bergenhus len, an abolished administrative division in Norway
- Søndre Bergenhus amt, which became Hordaland county (in Vestland county, Norway)
- Nordre Bergenhus amt, which became Sogn og Fjordane county (in Vestland county, Norway)
- Bergenhus Regiment, a Norwegian Army infantry regiment located in Hordaland and Sogn og Fjordane counties

== See also ==
- Bergenhusen, a municipality in the district of Schleswig-Flensburg, in Schleswig-Holstein, Germany
