= Kronsgaard =

- Municipality
- Coat of arms

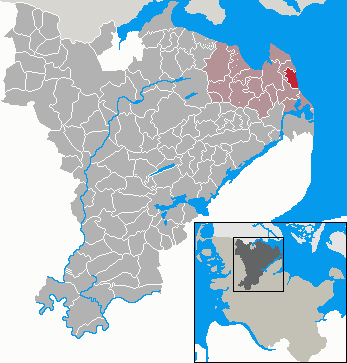
- Location of Kronsgaard within Schleswig-Flensburg district
- Interactive map of Kronsgaard
- Location within Germany Location within Schleswig-Holstein
- Coordinates: 54°43′52″N 9°57′51″E
- Country: Germany
- State: Schleswig-Holstein
- District: Schleswig-Flensburg
- Municipal assoc.: Geltinger Bucht

Government
  - Mayor: Wolfgang Kraack

Area
  - Total: 5.92 km^{2} (2.29 sq mi)
- Elevation: 0 m (0 ft)

Population (2025-12-31)
  - Total: 273
  - Density: 46.1/km^{2} (119/sq mi)
- Time zone: UTC+01:00 (CET)
  - Summer (DST): UTC+02:00 (CEST)
- Postal codes: 24395
- Dialling codes: 04643
- Vehicle registration: SL
- Website: www.kronsgaard.de

Kronsgaard is a municipality in the district of Schleswig-Flensburg, in Schleswig-Holstein, Germany. Located near Geltinger Bucht, an inlet of the Baltic Sea in the Angeln region, the municipality is assigned to the Geltinger Bucht district. The village of Kronsgaard covers 592 hectares, has around 250 inhabitants and a coastline of around 3 kilometres with a popular natural beach at Pottloch.

== Districts & Neighbouring Municipalities ==
The following districts comprise the municipality Breede (Danish: Brede), Boysenfeld (Boysensmark), Domstag (Dommedag), Düttebüll (Dyttebøl), Golsmaas (Galtmose, also Golsmose), Klorr, Langfeld (Langmark) and Pottloch (Puthul).

To the north and north-west lies the municipality of Pommerby, to the south and south-west the municipality of Hasselberg. The eastern border of Kronsgaard is defined by the Baltic Sea.

== Coat of arms ==
"Against a blue background, a golden crown above a silver cross, whose crossbar ends in nail points and whose long bar ends in a ring with an eyelet at the top and a ball at the bottom." The coat of arms depicts the Kronsgaard death key. This is carried from house to house in the event of a death to inform the neighbours.

== History ==
Kronsgaard was first mentioned as a farmstead in 1535, the name being a combination of the Danish Gaard or Gård for farm and Kron for crown, likely as a reference to the farmstead being in royal ownership. On a 16th century map by Marcus Jordanus, the place appears as Crongart. Local tradition has the original farm buildings being demolished and the stones being used as building material for the nearby Ohrfeld estate in Gelting. Initially, Kronsgaard belonged to the Buckhagen estate, later to the Düttebüll estate.

In 1922, the Antrax - a salvage steamer from the Mürwik torpedo station - sank off the coast near Kronsgaard. Twelve marines died. A memorial stone commemorating the loss of the Antrax can be seen near the Captain's House Sonwik in Mürwik Harbour.

== Culture and places of interest ==
The Kronsgaard megalithic tomb (also called Smaahus) or Großsteingrab Kronsgaard was a Neolithic grave complex in Kronsgaard. The megalithic complex was associated with the Funnel Beaker Culture (TBK) and was built between 3500 and 2800 BC. The grave was located immediately west of the road intersection of Dorfstrasse and Jägerbucht; the lane that leads west from this intersection is called Smahuus, in recognition of the tomb's location. More precise information is only possible thanks to Pastor Jensen's description from 1838. Accordingly, it was probably a north-south oriented dolmen. The burial mound had a diameter of 30 paces (approx. 22.50 m), a height of 7 feet (approx. 2.15 m) and was framed in a circle by surrounding stones. The burial chamber consisted of five wall stones and two cover stones. The wall stones were divided into two support stones on the west side and one support stone on the east side as well as a cap stone in the south. The northern wall stone was found a little away from its original location. The chamber was 7 feet long (approx. 2.15 m) and 2 feet wide (approx. 0.65 m). It was wider at the floor than at the ceiling because the wall stones were at an angle. Ernst Sprockhoff lists the grave in his atlas of megalithic graves under number 35.

Düttebüll Manor: The village of Düttebüll, which is now part of the municipality, was first mentioned in 1409. The first Düttebüll Manor was built in 1554 by Henneke von Rumohr as an aristocratic residence. Up until 1727, seven generations of the von Rumohr family owned the estate. The current manor house was considerably remodelled in 1785. In addition to the manor house, farm buildings, a bridge over the moat and an avenue of lime trees have been preserved. It is completely surrounded by a moat. The estate has been in the private ownership of the von Hobe family since 1902 and is not open to visitors.

The Schleswig-Holstein Uprising Memorial Stone: At the junction of An Der Inseln and Jägerbucht stands a commemorative stone that reads: Commemorating the 50th anniversary of the Schleswig-Holstein uprising Kronsgaard 24 March 1898 (zur erinnerung an den 50 jährigen erhebungstag Schleswig-Holstein Kronsgaard 24 März 1898).

== Economy and transport ==
The municipality is characterised by agriculture and tourism, whereby tourism is particularly concentrated in the district of Golsmaas and at Pottloch on the Baltic Sea coast. The main part of Golsmaas consists of the DEW holiday village, which was built in 1965 and consists of more than 60 holiday homes. Kronsgaard has a natural beach at Pottloch, which is almost three kilometres long. During the summer season, Pottloch beach is guarded by the German Life Saving Association, which organises an annual summer festival.

== Prominent Personalities ==
Christoph Ludwig Vollertsen - born in 1754 in Düttebüll; died in 1841 in Hütten, Protestant-Lutheran clergyman
