= Quern =

- Ortsteil of Steinbergkirche
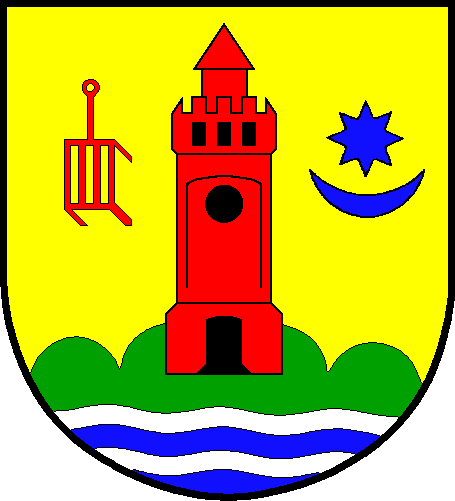
- Coat of arms
- Interactive map of Quern
- Location within Germany Location within Schleswig-Holstein
- Coordinates: 54°45′N 9°43′E
- Country: Germany
- State: Schleswig-Holstein
- District: Schleswig-Flensburg
- Municipality: Steinbergkirche

Area
  - Total: 22.74 km^{2} (8.78 sq mi)
- Elevation: 24 m (79 ft)

Population (2013)
  - Total: 1,289
  - Density: 56.68/km^{2} (146.8/sq mi)
- Time zone: UTC+01:00 (CET)
  - Summer (DST): UTC+02:00 (CEST)
- Postal codes: 24972
- Dialling codes: 04632
- Vehicle registration: SL

Quern (Danish: Kværn) is a former municipality in the district of Schleswig-Flensburg, in Schleswig-Holstein, Germany. Since 1 March 2013, it has been part of the municipality of Steinbergkirche.
