= Stapel, Schleswig-Holstein =

Stapel
- Municipality
- Coat of arms

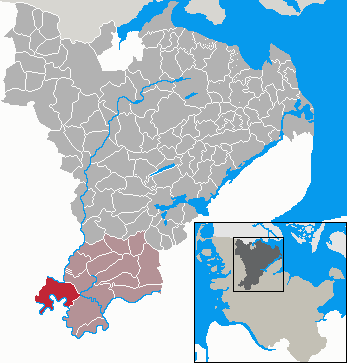
- Location of Stapel within Schleswig-Flensburg district
- Interactive map of Stapel
- Location within Germany Location within Schleswig-Holstein
- Coordinates: 54°21′N 9°13′E
- Country: Germany
- State: Schleswig-Holstein
- District: Schleswig-Flensburg
- Municipal assoc.: Kropp-Stapelholm

Area
  - Total: 32.67 km^{2} (12.61 sq mi)
- Elevation: 6 m (20 ft)

Population (2025-12-31)
  - Total: 1,967
  - Density: 60.21/km^{2} (155.9/sq mi)
- Time zone: UTC+01:00 (CET)
  - Summer (DST): UTC+02:00 (CEST)
- Postal codes: 25868, 25879
- Dialling codes: 04883
- Vehicle registration: SL

Stapel (German pronunciation: [ˈʃtaːpl̩]; Danish: Stabel) is a municipality in the district of Schleswig-Flensburg, in Schleswig-Holstein, Germany. It was created in March 2018 by the merger of the former municipalities of Norderstapel and Süderstapel.
