= The Joy of Pregnancy =

2008 book by Tori Kropp

- Author: Tori Kropp
- Language: English
- Subject: pregnancy
- Genre: Non-fiction
- Publisher: The Harvard Common Press
- Publication date: 2008
- Publication place: United States
- Media type: paperback
- Pages: 415 (1st ed.)
- ISBN: 978-1-55832-306-3
- OCLC: 179813700
- Dewey Decimal: 618.2 22
- LC Class: RG551 .K76 2008

The Joy of Pregnancy is a guide to pregnancy and childbirth written by Tori Kropp and published by The Harvard Common Press in April 2008.

== Format ==
The Joy of Pregnancy is written in a month-by-month format. Each chapter begins with a section on changes within mom's body and includes "Important Things to Know" for that month, such as medical tests to schedule, questions to ask the doctor, and products that should be bought for baby and mom. "Tori's Tips" are dispersed throughout the book, with specific advice from Tori relating to each month. The chapters also include question and answer sections, questions from Tori's readers, as well as information for dads in the "Dad's Corner."

== Awards ==
The Joy of Pregnancy received The National Parenting Center's Seal of Approval in 2008. The book was also designated as a "Best Consumer Health 2008" title by Library Journal.
