= Oersberg =

Oersberg Ørsbjerg
- Municipality
- Coat of arms

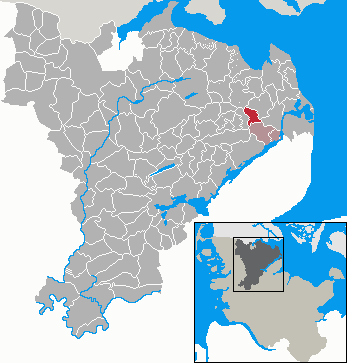
- Location of Oersberg; Ørsbjerg within Schleswig-Flensburg district
- Interactive map of Oersberg; Ørsbjerg
- Location within Germany Location within Schleswig-Holstein
- Coordinates: 54°40′N 9°50′E
- Country: Germany
- State: Schleswig-Holstein
- District: Schleswig-Flensburg
- Municipal assoc.: Kappeln-Land

Government
  - Mayor: Peter-Heinrich Lassen

Area
  - Total: 7.09 km^{2} (2.74 sq mi)
- Elevation: 34 m (112 ft)

Population (2025-12-31)
  - Total: 262
  - Density: 37.0/km^{2} (95.7/sq mi)
- Time zone: UTC+01:00 (CET)
  - Summer (DST): UTC+02:00 (CEST)
- Postal codes: 24407
- Dialling codes: 04642
- Vehicle registration: SL
- Website: www.kappeln.info

Oersberg (German pronunciation: [ˈøːɐ̯sbɛʁk]; Danish: Ørsbjerg) is a municipality in the district of Schleswig-Flensburg, in Schleswig-Holstein, Germany.
