= Rabenkirchen-Faulück =

Rabenkirchen-Faulück Ravnkær-Fovlløk
- Municipality
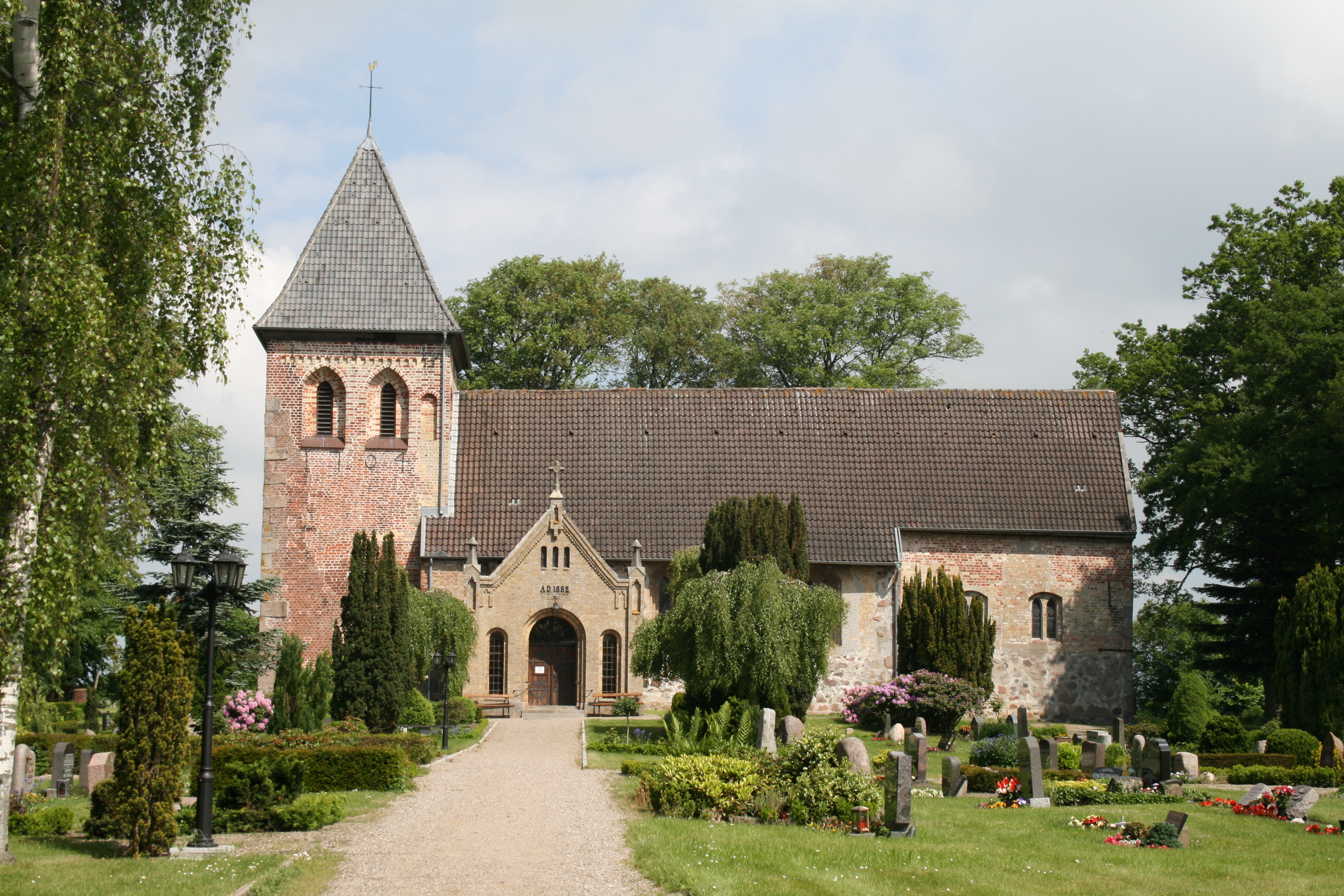
- Church in Rabenkirchen

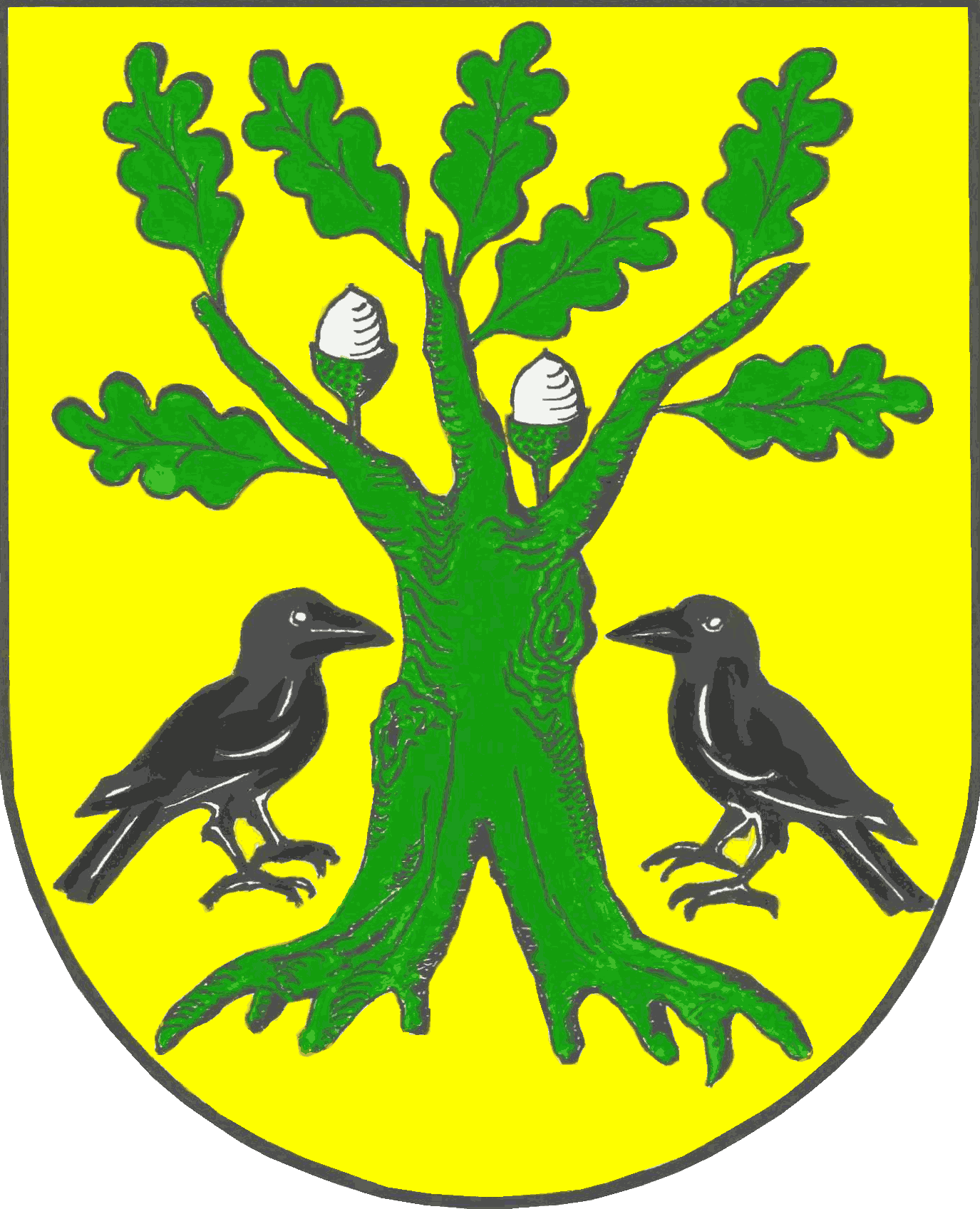
- Coat of arms

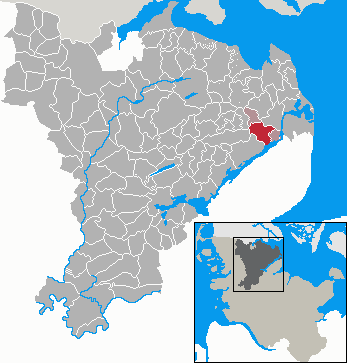
- Location of Rabenkirchen-Faulück within Schleswig-Flensburg district
- Interactive map of Rabenkirchen-Faulück
- Location within Germany Location within Schleswig-Holstein
- Coordinates: 54°37′N 9°50′E
- Country: Germany
- State: Schleswig-Holstein
- District: Schleswig-Flensburg
- Municipal assoc.: Kappeln-Land

Government
  - Mayor: Peter-Martin Dreyer

Area
  - Total: 14.21 km^{2} (5.49 sq mi)
- Elevation: 30 m (98 ft)

Population (2025-12-31)
  - Total: 640
  - Density: 45/km^{2} (120/sq mi)
- Time zone: UTC+01:00 (CET)
  - Summer (DST): UTC+02:00 (CEST)
- Postal codes: 24407
- Dialling codes: 04642
- Vehicle registration: SL
- Website: www.kappeln.info

Rabenkirchen-Faulück (Danish: Ravnkær-Fovlløk) is a municipality in the district of Schleswig-Flensburg, in Schleswig-Holstein, Germany.
