= Grödersby =

Grödersby Grødersby
- Municipality
- Coat of arms

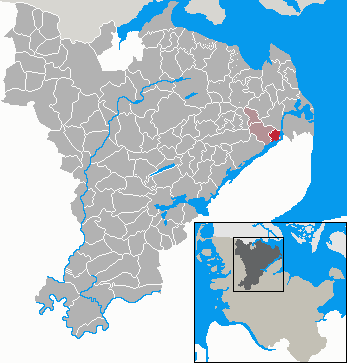
- Location of Grödersby; Grødersby within Schleswig-Flensburg district
- Interactive map of Grödersby; Grødersby
- Location within Germany Location within Schleswig-Holstein
- Coordinates: 54°38′14″N 9°55′7″E
- Country: Germany
- State: Schleswig-Holstein
- District: Schleswig-Flensburg
- Municipal assoc.: Kappeln-Land

Government
  - Mayor: Helmut Andresen

Area
  - Total: 6.64 km^{2} (2.56 sq mi)
- Elevation: 0 m (0 ft)

Population (2025-12-31)
  - Total: 215
  - Density: 32.4/km^{2} (83.9/sq mi)
- Time zone: UTC+01:00 (CET)
  - Summer (DST): UTC+02:00 (CEST)
- Postal codes: 24376
- Dialling codes: 04642
- Vehicle registration: SL
- Website: www.kappeln.info

Grödersby (Danish: Grødersby, also Grødesby) is a municipality in the district of Schleswig-Flensburg, in Schleswig-Holstein, Germany.
