= Norderstapel =

- Ortsteil of Stapel
- Coat of arms
- Interactive map of Norderstapel
- Location within Germany Location within Schleswig-Holstein
- Coordinates: 54°21′46″N 9°14′46″E
- Country: Germany
- State: Schleswig-Holstein
- District: Schleswig-Flensburg
- Municipality: Stapel

Area
  - Total: 16.01 km^{2} (6.18 sq mi)
- Elevation: 6 m (20 ft)

Population (2016-12-31)
  - Total: 767
  - Density: 47.9/km^{2} (124/sq mi)
- Time zone: UTC+01:00 (CET)
  - Summer (DST): UTC+02:00 (CEST)
- Postal codes: 25868
- Dialling codes: 04883
- Vehicle registration: SL
- Website: www.kropp.de

Norderstapel (German pronunciation: [ˈnɔʁdɐˌʃtaːpl̩], lit. 'North Stapel'; Danish: Nørre Stabel) is a village and a former municipality in the district of Schleswig-Flensburg, in Schleswig-Holstein, Germany. Since March 2018, it is part of the municipality Stapel.
