= Pommerby =

- Municipality
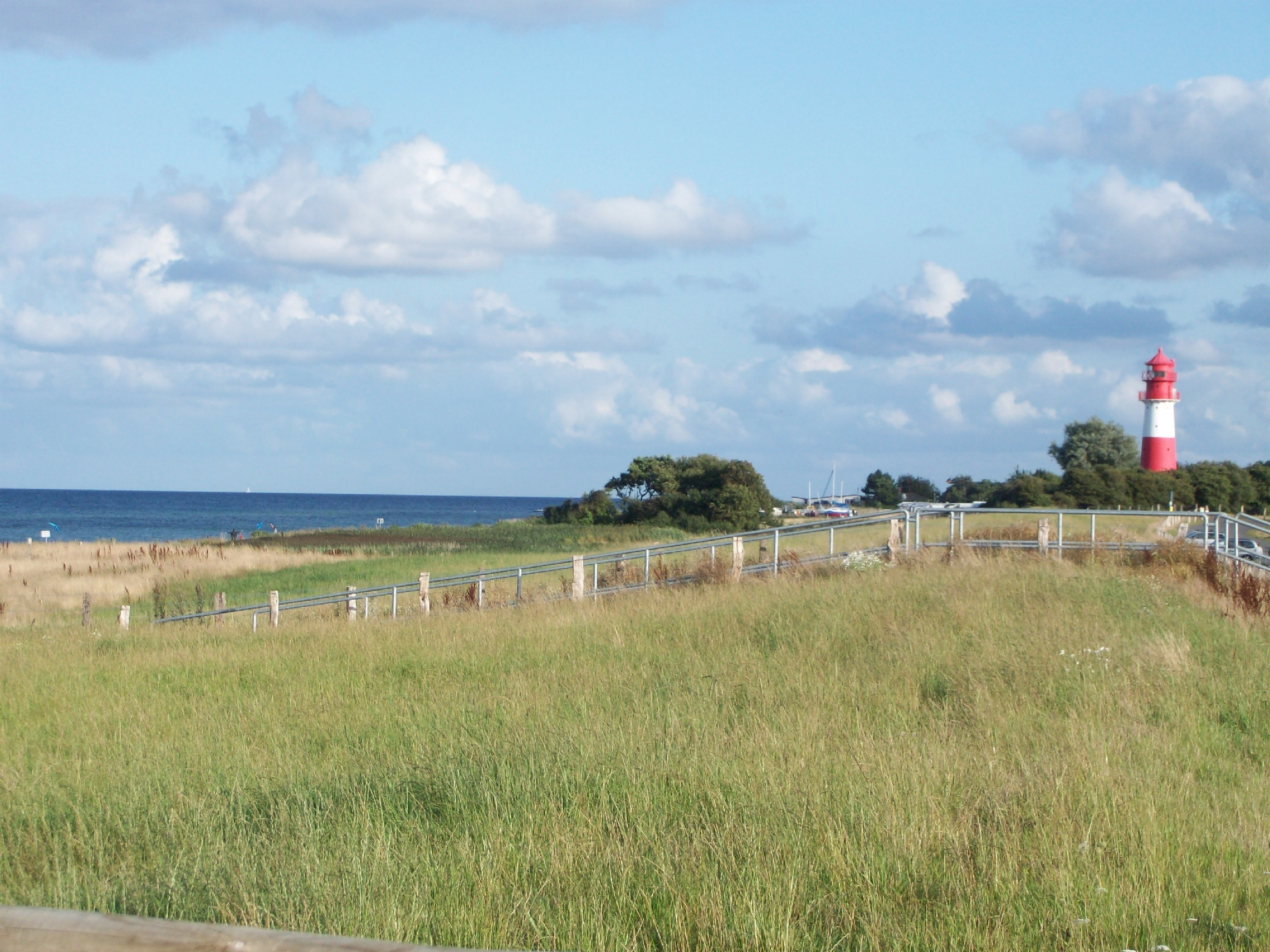

- Coat of arms

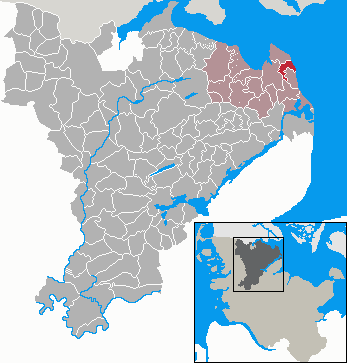
- Location of Pommerby within Schleswig-Flensburg district
- Interactive map of Pommerby
- Location within Germany Location within Schleswig-Holstein
- Coordinates: 54°46′N 9°56′E
- Country: Germany
- State: Schleswig-Holstein
- District: Schleswig-Flensburg
- Municipal assoc.: Geltinger Bucht

Government
  - Mayor: Gert Nagel

Area
  - Total: 5.55 km^{2} (2.14 sq mi)
- Elevation: 19 m (62 ft)

Population (2025-12-31)
  - Total: 156
  - Density: 28.1/km^{2} (72.8/sq mi)
- Time zone: UTC+01:00 (CET)
  - Summer (DST): UTC+02:00 (CEST)
- Postal codes: 24395
- Dialling codes: 0 46 43
- Vehicle registration: SL

Pommerby is a municipality in the district of Schleswig-Flensburg, in Schleswig-Holstein, Germany.

Pommerby is bordered by Kronsgaard to the south and Nieby. The eastern border flanks the Baltic Sea
