= Kappeln-Land =

Collective municipality in Germany

- Amt
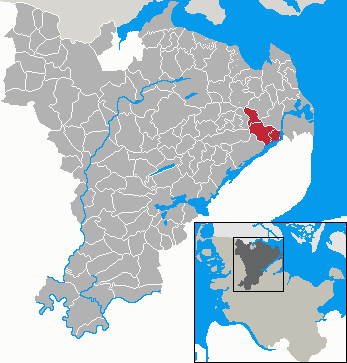
- Map of Schleswig-Flensburg highlighting Kappeln-Land
- Interactive map of Kappeln-Land
- Location within Germany Location within Schleswig-Holstein
- Coordinates: 54°37′N 9°50′E
- Country: Germany
- State: Schleswig-Holstein
- District: Schleswig-Flensburg
- Seat: Kappeln
- Subdivisions: 4 municipalities

Area
  - Total: 28.4 km^{2} (11.0 sq mi)

Population (2025-12-31)
  - Total: 1,375
  - Density: 48.4/km^{2} (125/sq mi)
- Time zone: UTC+01:00 (CET)
  - Summer (DST): UTC+02:00 (CEST)
- Vehicle registration: SL
- Website: www.amt-arensharde.de

Kappeln-Land is an Amt ("collective municipality") in the district of Schleswig-Flensburg, in Schleswig-Holstein, Germany. It is situated on the north bank of the Schlei, around Kappeln, which is the seat of the Amt, but not part of it.

The Amt Kappeln-Land consists of the following municipalities (population in 2024 between brackets):

- Arnis (251)
- Grödersby (219)
- Oersberg (293)
- Rabenkirchen-Faulück (635)
