= Sörup =

Sörup Sørup
- Municipality
- Coat of arms

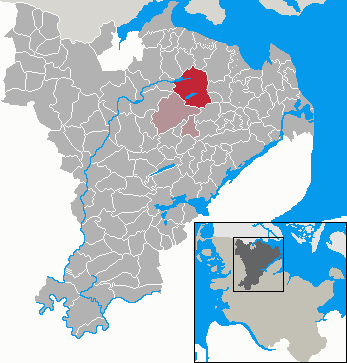
- Location of Sörup; Sørup within Schleswig-Flensburg district
- Interactive map of Sörup; Sørup
- Location within Germany Location within Schleswig-Holstein
- Coordinates: 54°43′7″N 9°40′19″E
- Country: Germany
- State: Schleswig-Holstein
- District: Schleswig-Flensburg

Government
  - Mayor: Friedrich Martens

Area
  - Total: 44.31 km^{2} (17.11 sq mi)
- Elevation: 46 m (151 ft)

Population (2025-12-31)
  - Total: 4,092
  - Density: 92.35/km^{2} (239.2/sq mi)
- Time zone: UTC+01:00 (CET)
  - Summer (DST): UTC+02:00 (CEST)
- Postal codes: 24966
- Dialling codes: 04635
- Vehicle registration: SL
- Website: www.soerup.de

Sörup (Danish: Sørup) is a municipality in the district of Schleswig-Flensburg, in Schleswig-Holstein, Germany. It is situated approximately 23 km northeast of Schleswig, and 17 km southeast of Flensburg.
