= Geltinger Bucht =

- Amt
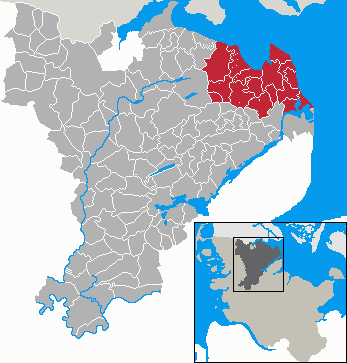
- Map of Schleswig-Flensburg highlighting Geltinger Bucht
- Interactive map of Geltinger Bucht
- Location within Germany Location within Schleswig-Holstein
- Coordinates: 54°45′N 9°54′E
- Country: Germany
- State: Schleswig-Holstein
- District: Schleswig-Flensburg
- Seat: Steinbergkirche
- Subdivisions: 16 municipalities

Area
  - Total: 201.25 km^{2} (77.70 sq mi)

Population (2025-12-31)
  - Total: 13,037
  - Density: 64.780/km^{2} (167.78/sq mi)
- Time zone: UTC+01:00 (CET)
  - Summer (DST): UTC+02:00 (CEST)
- Vehicle registration: SL
- Website: www.amt-geltingerbucht.de

Geltinger Bucht is an Amt ("collective municipality") in the district of Schleswig-Flensburg, in Schleswig-Holstein, Germany. Its seat is in Steinbergkirche. It was formed on 1 January 2008 from the former Ämter Gelting and Steinbergkirche.

The Amt Geltinger Bucht consists of the following municipalities:

1. Ahneby
2. Esgrus
3. Gelting
4. Hasselberg
5. Kronsgaard
6. Maasholm
7. Nieby
8. Niesgrau
9. Pommerby
10. Rabel
11. Rabenholz
12. Stangheck
13. Steinberg
14. Steinbergkirche
15. Sterup
16. Stoltebüll
