= Niesgrau =

Niesgrau Nisvrå
- Municipality
- Coat of arms

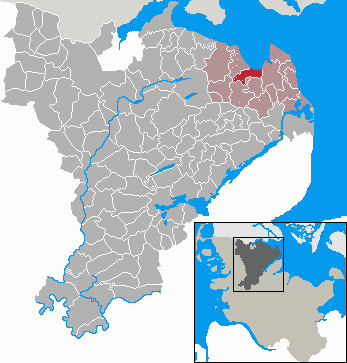
- Location of Niesgrau; Nisvrå within Schleswig-Flensburg district
- Interactive map of Niesgrau; Nisvrå
- Location within Germany Location within Schleswig-Holstein
- Coordinates: 54°45′N 9°49′E
- Country: Germany
- State: Schleswig-Holstein
- District: Schleswig-Flensburg
- Municipal assoc.: Geltinger Bucht

Government
  - Mayor: Thomas Johannsen

Area
  - Total: 9.89 km^{2} (3.82 sq mi)
- Elevation: 15 m (49 ft)

Population (2025-12-31)
  - Total: 534
  - Density: 54.0/km^{2} (140/sq mi)
- Time zone: UTC+01:00 (CET)
  - Summer (DST): UTC+02:00 (CEST)
- Postal codes: 24395
- Dialling codes: 04632
- Vehicle registration: SL

Niesgrau (Danish: Nisvrå) is a municipality in the district of Schleswig-Flensburg, in Schleswig-Holstein, northern Germany near the Danish border.
