= Klein Bennebek =

- Municipality
- Coat of arms

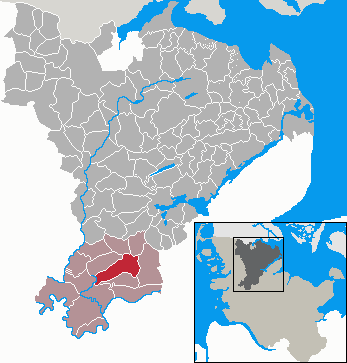
- Location of Klein Bennebek within Schleswig-Flensburg district
- Interactive map of Klein Bennebek
- Location within Germany Location within Schleswig-Holstein
- Coordinates: 54°24′16″N 9°27′49″E
- Country: Germany
- State: Schleswig-Holstein
- District: Schleswig-Flensburg
- Municipal assoc.: Kropp-Stapelholm

Government
  - Mayor: Ernst Stolley

Area
  - Total: 25.63 km^{2} (9.90 sq mi)
- Elevation: 9 m (30 ft)

Population (2025-12-31)
  - Total: 529
  - Density: 20.6/km^{2} (53.5/sq mi)
- Time zone: UTC+01:00 (CET)
  - Summer (DST): UTC+02:00 (CEST)
- Postal codes: 24848
- Dialling codes: 04624
- Vehicle registration: SL
- Website: www.kropp.de

Klein Bennebek (Danish: Lille Bennebæk) is a municipality in the district of Schleswig-Flensburg, in Schleswig-Holstein, Germany.
