= Stangheck =

Stangheck Stangled
- Municipality
- Coat of arms

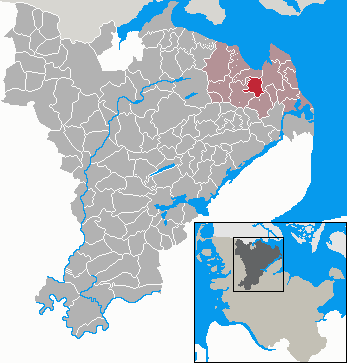
- Location of Stangheck; Stangled within Schleswig-Flensburg district
- Interactive map of Stangheck; Stangled
- Location within Germany Location within Schleswig-Holstein
- Coordinates: 54°43′N 9°52′E
- Country: Germany
- State: Schleswig-Holstein
- District: Schleswig-Flensburg
- Municipal assoc.: Geltinger Bucht

Government
  - Mayor: Helmut Erichsen

Area
  - Total: 10.00 km^{2} (3.86 sq mi)
- Elevation: 33 m (108 ft)

Population (2025-12-31)
  - Total: 253
  - Density: 25.3/km^{2} (65.5/sq mi)
- Time zone: UTC+01:00 (CET)
  - Summer (DST): UTC+02:00 (CEST)
- Postal codes: 24395
- Dialling codes: 04643
- Vehicle registration: SL
- Website: www.stangheck.de

Stangheck (Danish: Stangled) is a municipality in the district of Schleswig-Flensburg, in Schleswig-Holstein, Germany.
