= Esgrus =

Esgrus Eskeris
- Municipality
- Coat of arms

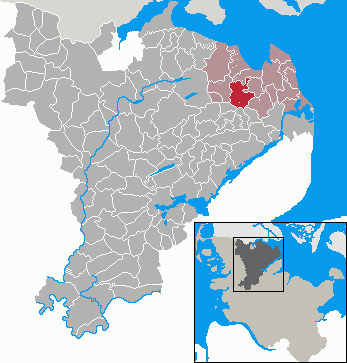
- Location of Esgrus; Eskeris within Schleswig-Flensburg district
- Interactive map of Esgrus; Eskeris
- Location within Germany Location within Schleswig-Holstein
- Coordinates: 54°43′N 9°46′E
- Country: Germany
- State: Schleswig-Holstein
- District: Schleswig-Flensburg
- Municipal assoc.: Geltinger Bucht

Government
  - Mayor: Jürgen Vogel

Area
  - Total: 18.06 km^{2} (6.97 sq mi)
- Elevation: 39 m (128 ft)

Population (2025-12-31)
  - Total: 809
  - Density: 44.8/km^{2} (116/sq mi)
- Time zone: UTC+01:00 (CET)
  - Summer (DST): UTC+02:00 (CEST)
- Postal codes: 24402
- Dialling codes: 04637
- Vehicle registration: SL

Esgrus (Danish: Eskeris) is a municipality in the district of Schleswig-Flensburg, in Schleswig-Holstein, Germany.

The municipality consists of the hamlet of Esgrus, where the church is located, and which gave the municipality its name, three villages - Wippendorf, Brunsholm and Esgrusschauby - and four other hamlets (Atzbüll, Birzhaft, Grünholz, Haveholz). Esgrus is located in the northeast of Anglia, 6 km from the Gelting Bay and the Baltic Sea.

St. Mary's Church from the 12th century is one of the oldest fieldstone churches in Anglia. The Frauenhof estate is located in the southeast of the municipality. The representative three-sided farm can be reached via a picturesque alley with a half-timbered gatehouse. A second manor house is Brunsholmhof.

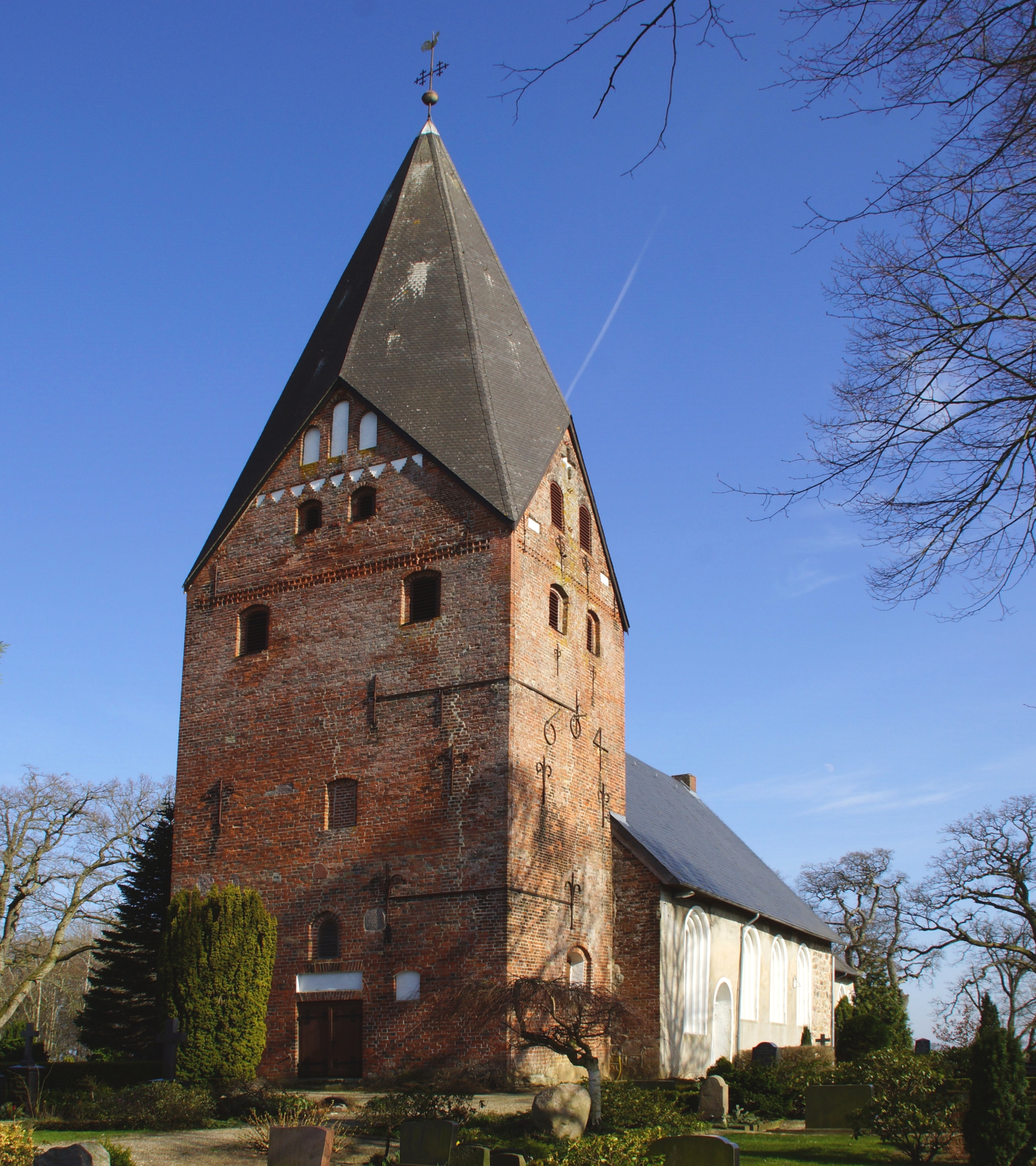
St. Mary's Church

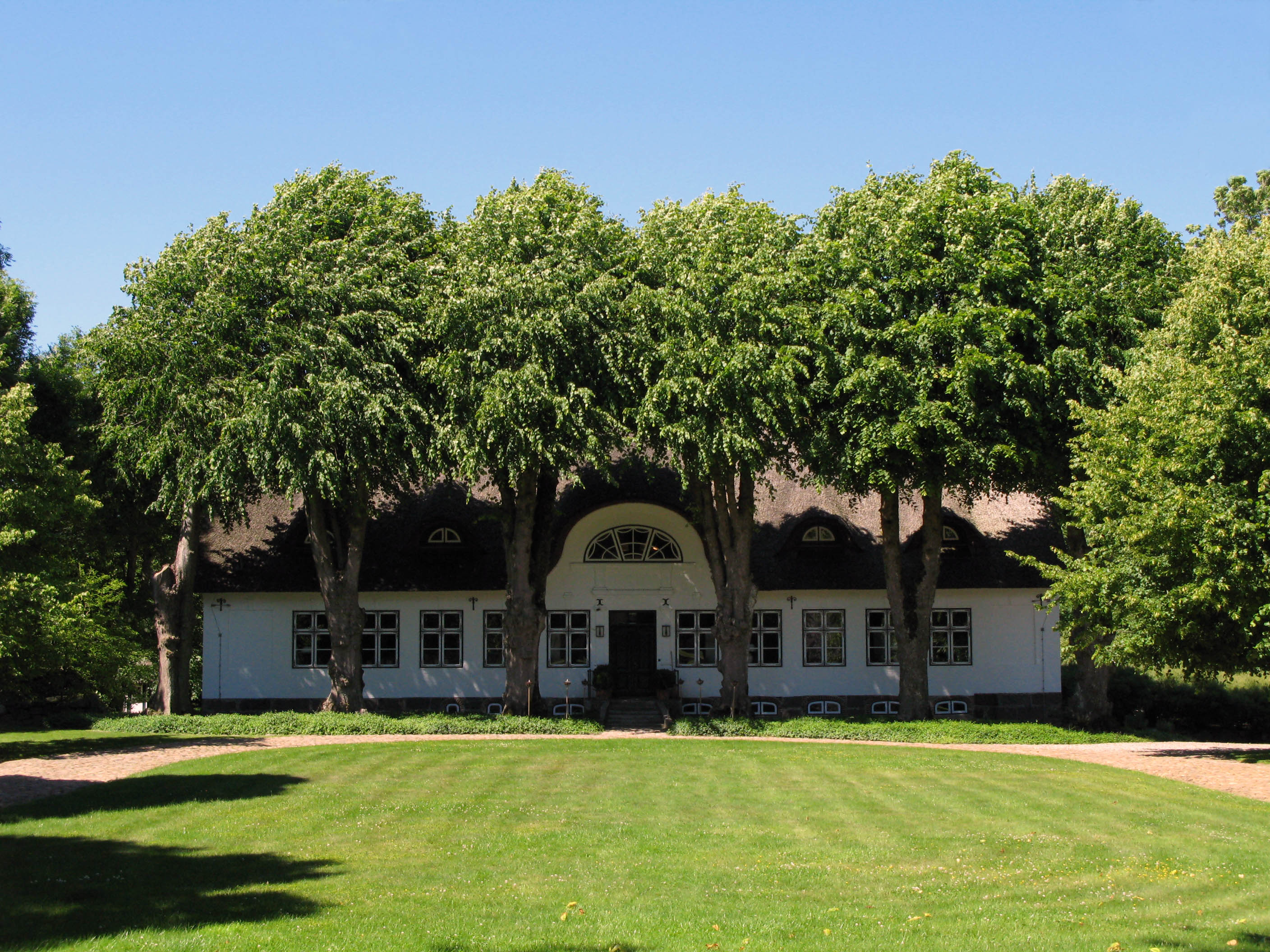
Frauenhof, Manor House with row of lime trees

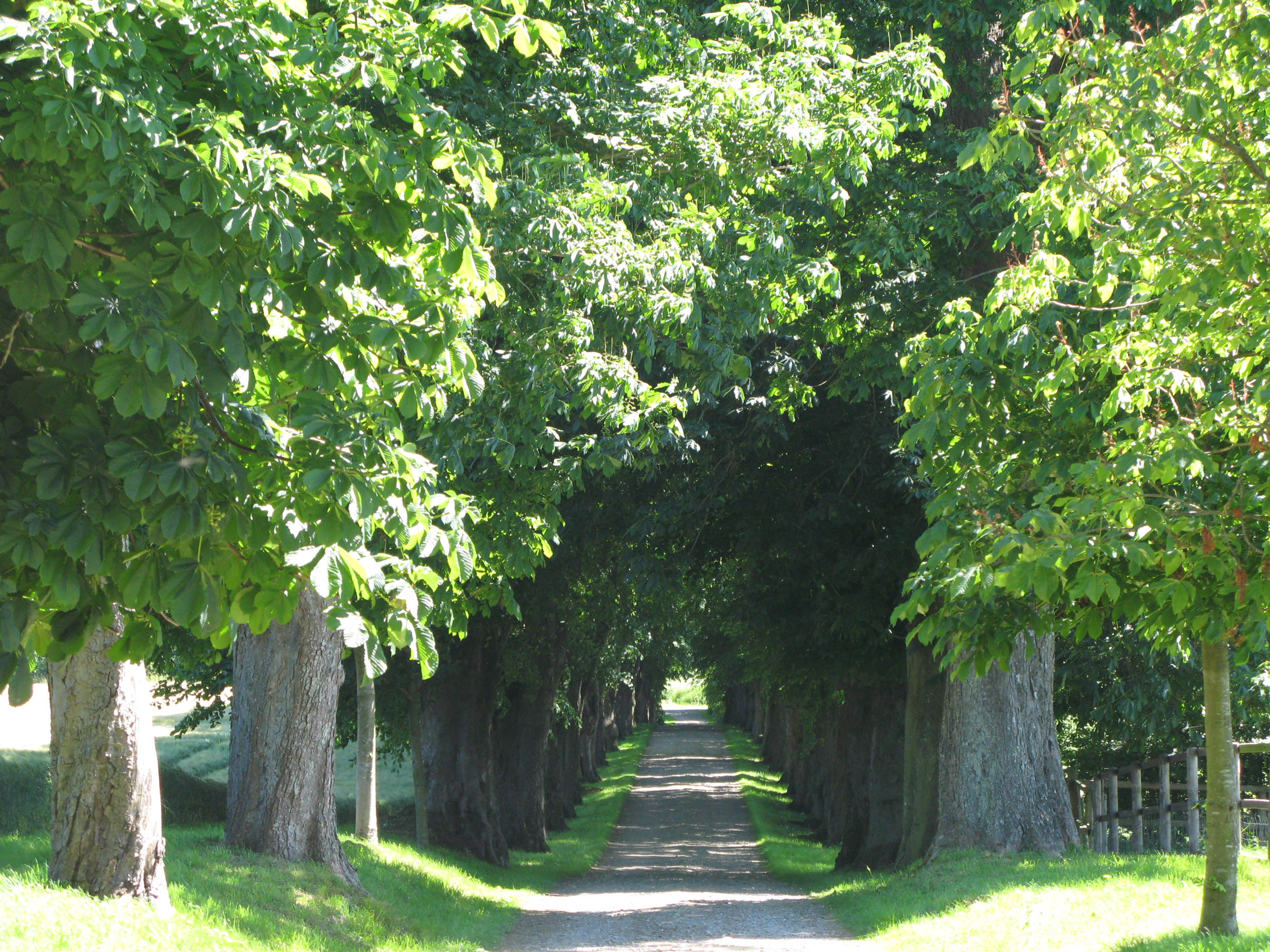
Frauenhof Alley

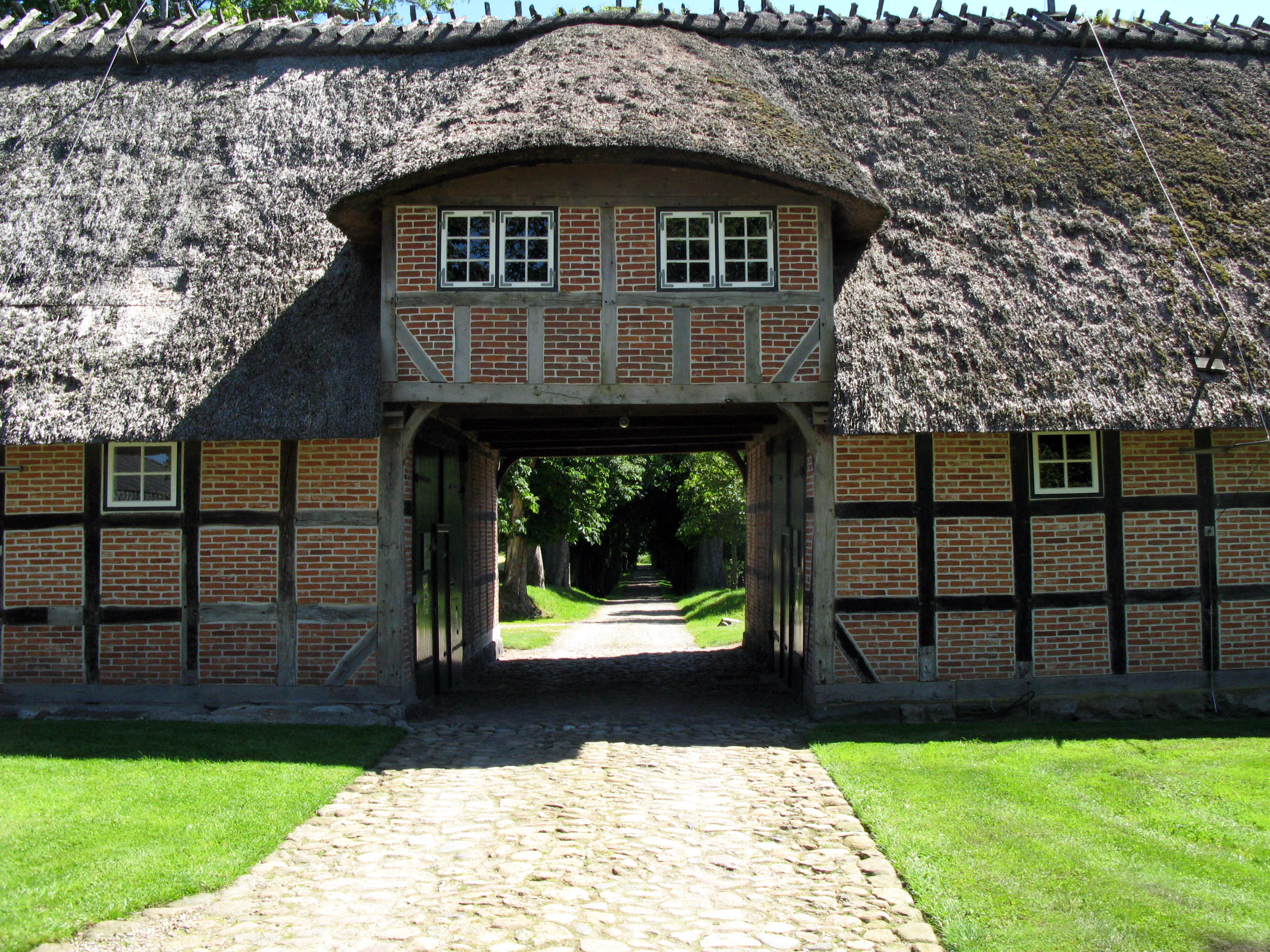
Frauenhof Thatchered Gate House

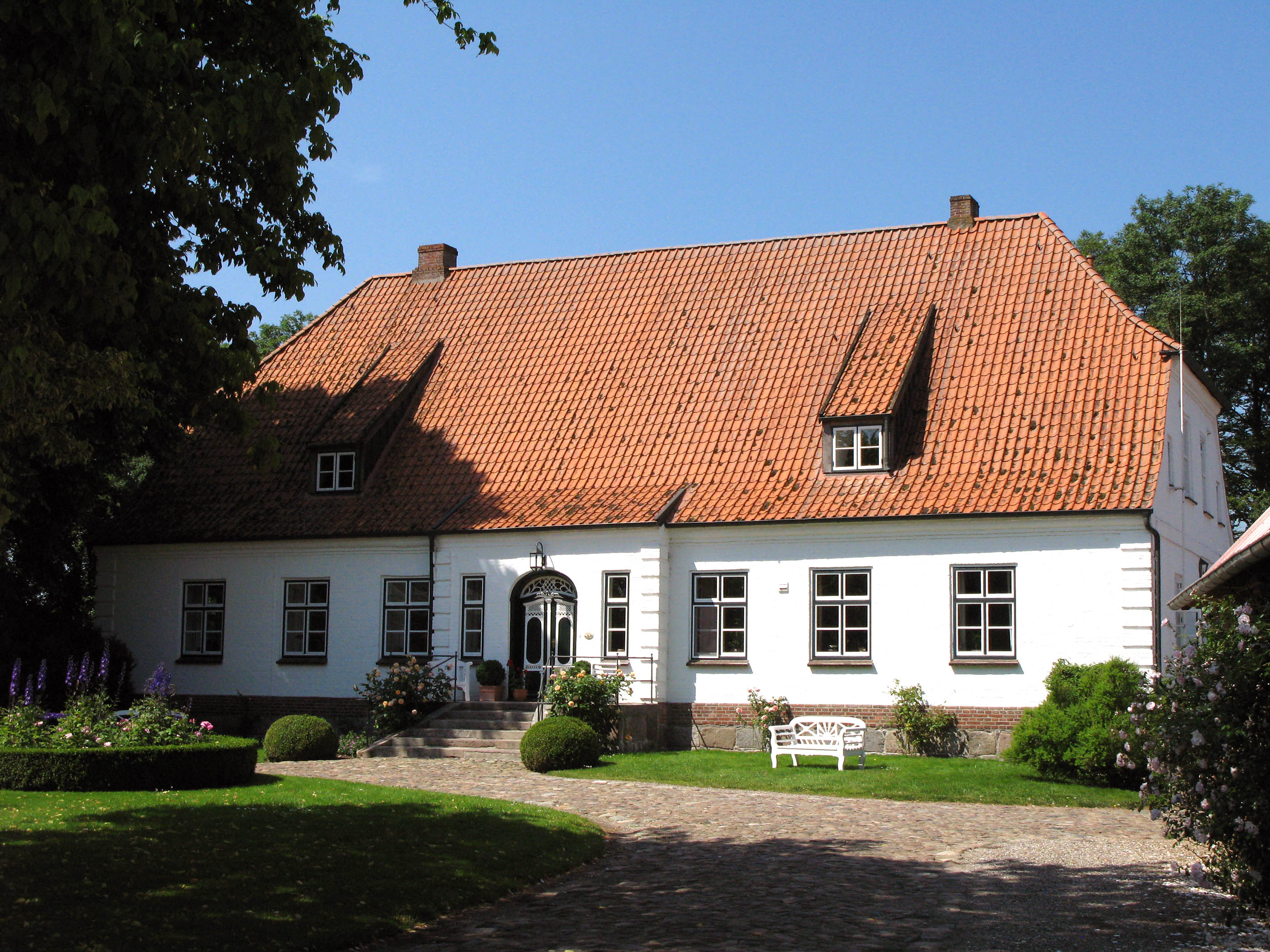
Brunsholmhof
