= Börm =

Börm Børm
- Municipality
- Coat of arms

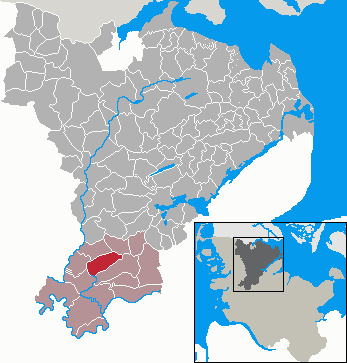
- Location of Börm; Børm within Schleswig-Flensburg district
- Interactive map of Börm; Børm
- Location within Germany Location within Schleswig-Holstein
- Coordinates: 54°24′N 9°23′E
- Country: Germany
- State: Schleswig-Holstein
- District: Schleswig-Flensburg
- Municipal assoc.: Kropp-Stapelholm

Government
  - Mayor: Sigrid Cohrt

Area
  - Total: 18.71 km^{2} (7.22 sq mi)
- Elevation: 2 m (6.6 ft)

Population (2025-12-31)
  - Total: 735
  - Density: 39.3/km^{2} (102/sq mi)
- Time zone: UTC+01:00 (CET)
  - Summer (DST): UTC+02:00 (CEST)
- Postal codes: 24863
- Dialling codes: 04627
- Vehicle registration: SL
- Website: www.kropp.de

Börm (German pronunciation: [bœʁm]; Danish: Børm) is a municipality in the district of Schleswig-Flensburg, in Schleswig-Holstein, Germany.
