= Maasholm =

Maasholm Masholm
- Municipality
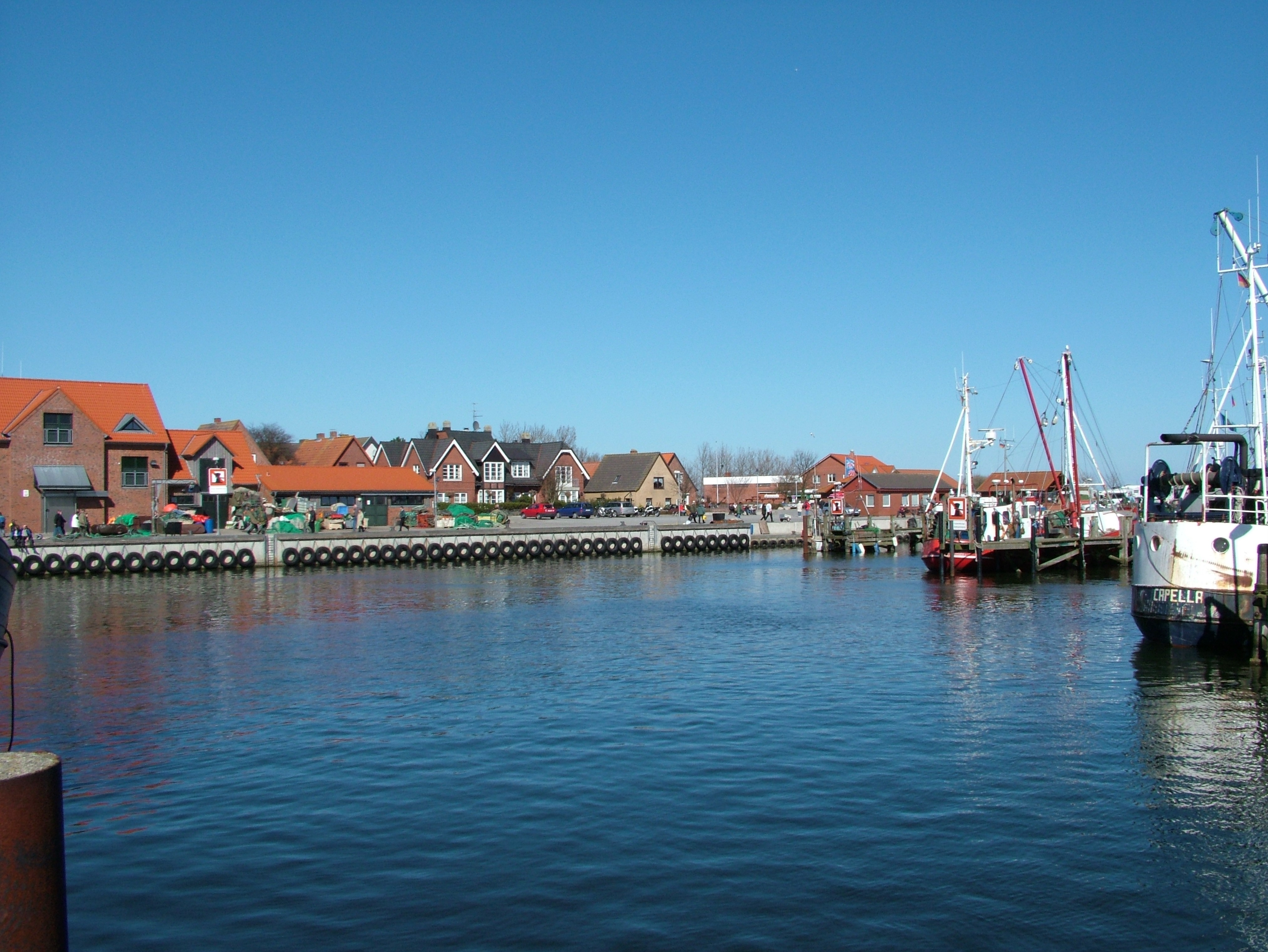
- Maasholm Harbour

- Coat of arms

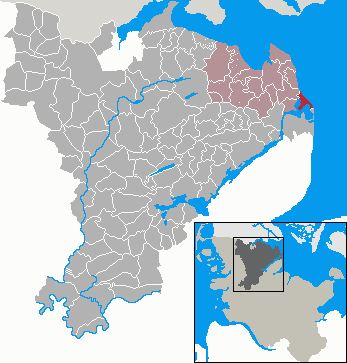
- Location of Maasholm; Masholm within Schleswig-Flensburg district
- Interactive map of Maasholm; Masholm
- Location within Germany Location within Schleswig-Holstein
- Coordinates: 54°41′4″N 9°59′27″E
- Country: Germany
- State: Schleswig-Holstein
- District: Schleswig-Flensburg
- Municipal assoc.: Geltinger Bucht

Government
  - Mayor: Kay-Uwe Andresen

Area
  - Total: 8.4 km^{2} (3.2 sq mi)
- Elevation: 0 m (0 ft)

Population (2025-12-31)
  - Total: 611
  - Density: 73/km^{2} (190/sq mi)
- Time zone: UTC+01:00 (CET)
  - Summer (DST): UTC+02:00 (CEST)
- Postal codes: 24404
- Dialling codes: 04642
- Vehicle registration: SL

Maasholm (Danish: Masholm, also Måsholm og Maesholm) is a municipality in the district of Schleswig-Flensburg, in Schleswig-Holstein, Germany. Maasholm has a significant fishing harbor (fishing registration code: MAA) and a fish smokehouse.

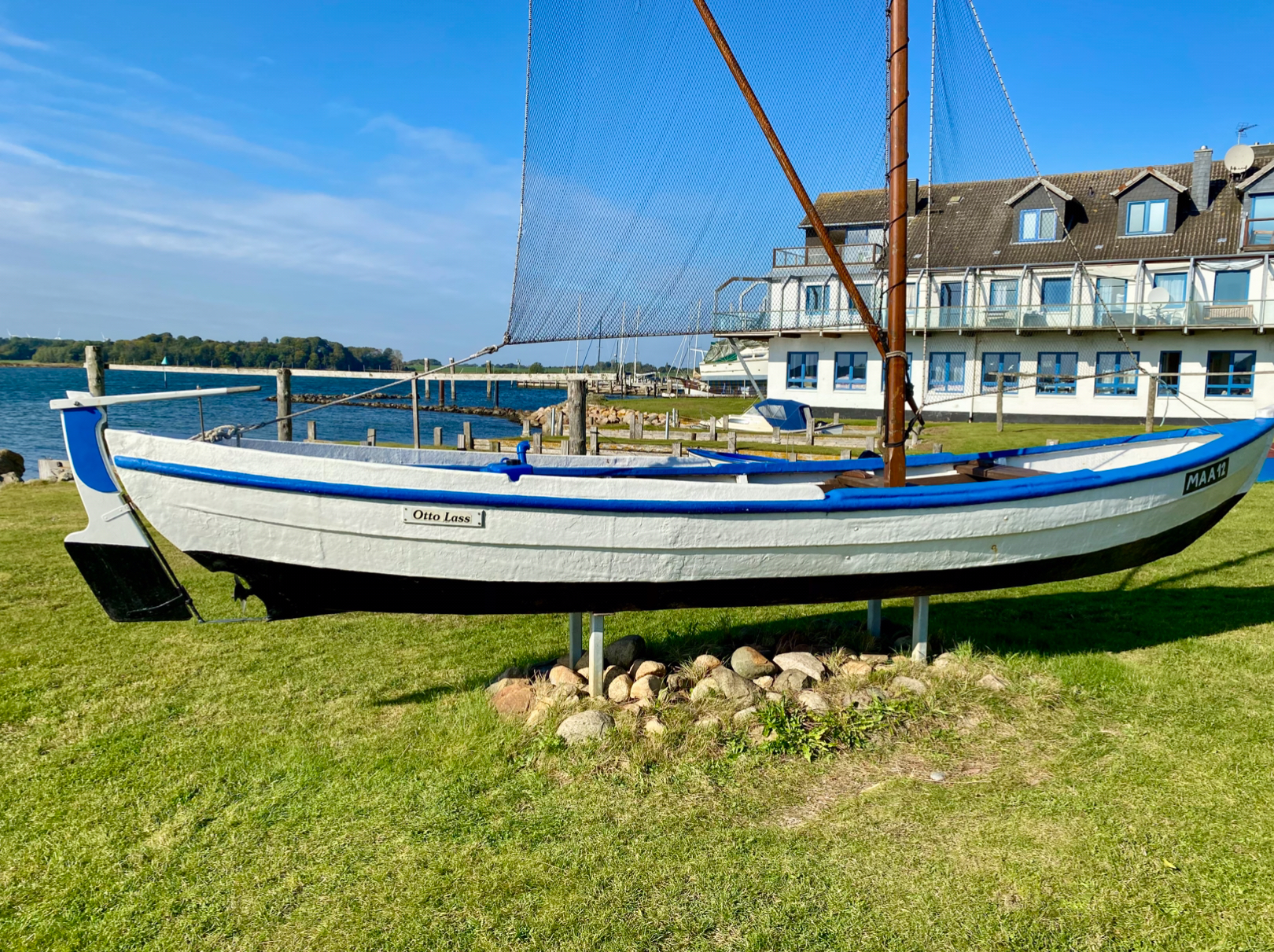
Historic fishing boat in Maasholm
