= Tori Kropp =

American writer

Tori Kropp is an internationally recognized pregnancy, woman's health, and early parenting expert. She is the author of the popular pregnancy guide, The Joy of Pregnancy published in April 2008 by The Harvard Common Press. She founded the online community "Stork Site" in 1995 as a resource for pregnant women. Kropp is a Registered Perinatal Nurse, and is well known as the "Dear Abby" of pregnancy. With over twenty years of experience as a perinatal nurse, she has delivered thousands of babies at the California Pacific Medical Center in San Francisco, CA. She lives in Marin County, CA, with her family.

== Education ==
Kropp studied anthropology and psychology as an undergraduate at Michigan State University and earned her nursing degree from Manatee College in Florida in 1984. While in college, Kropp started a homebirth advocacy group and it was during this time that her interest in labor and birth flourished.

== Early work ==
=== Pillow Talk ===
In 1990, Kropp founded Pillow Talk, Modern Childbirth Education, a pre- and post-natal teaching program. The core of the program was focused on teaching women not to overwhelm themselves with information and to focus instead on trusting their bodies and enjoying their pregnancies. Started in 1990, Kropp continues the Pillow Talk program today in private, one-on-one classes. Topics focus on childbirth preparation, the basics of baby care, and breastfeeding.

=== Stork Site ===
In 1995, Kropp adapted the approach she had developed for Pillow Talk in order to found Stork Site, an online community website for expectant and new parents, which later became a part of iVillage.com. At its peak, Stork Site had over 100,000 members, making it one of the largest pregnancy-related online groups at that time.

== Books ==
=== The Joy of Pregnancy ===
In April 2008, Kropp's first book was published by The Harvard Common Press. The Joy of Pregnancy drew upon Kropp's philosophy at Pillow Talk to present a book that was medically sound, yet not alarmist. The author used personal anecdotes, questions from her students, and medical information to both educate and reassure pregnant women. The tone of support and encouragement is what she felt was missing from other books on the subject.
