= Meggerdorf =

- Municipality
- Coat of arms

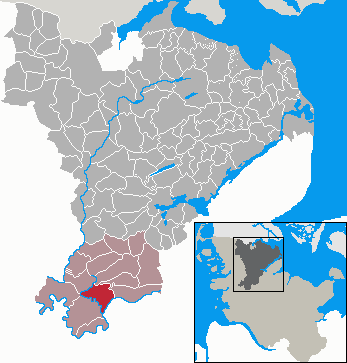
- Location of Meggerdorf within Schleswig-Flensburg district
- Interactive map of Meggerdorf
- Location within Germany Location within Schleswig-Holstein
- Coordinates: 54°20′46″N 9°24′5″E
- Country: Germany
- State: Schleswig-Holstein
- District: Schleswig-Flensburg
- Municipal assoc.: Kropp-Stapelholm

Government
  - Mayor: Uwe Stuck

Area
  - Total: 24.11 km^{2} (9.31 sq mi)
- Elevation: 3 m (9.8 ft)

Population (2025-12-31)
  - Total: 676
  - Density: 28.0/km^{2} (72.6/sq mi)
- Time zone: UTC+01:00 (CET)
  - Summer (DST): UTC+02:00 (CEST)
- Postal codes: 24799
- Dialling codes: 04339
- Vehicle registration: SL
- Website: www.kropp.de

Meggerdorf (Danish: Meggertorp) is a municipality in the district of Schleswig-Flensburg, in Schleswig-Holstein, Germany.
