= Stoltebüll =

Stoltebüll Stoltebøl
- Municipality
- Coat of arms

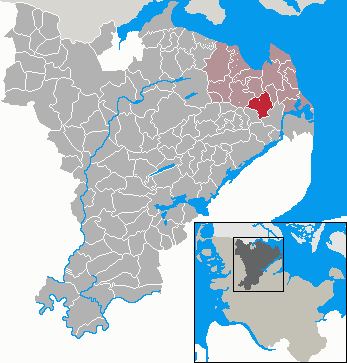
- Location of Stoltebüll; Stoltebøl within Schleswig-Flensburg district
- Interactive map of Stoltebüll; Stoltebøl
- Location within Germany Location within Schleswig-Holstein
- Coordinates: 54°41′45″N 9°52′35″E
- Country: Germany
- State: Schleswig-Holstein
- District: Schleswig-Flensburg
- Municipal assoc.: Geltinger Bucht

Government
  - Mayor: Hans-Jürgen Schwager

Area
  - Total: 16.40 km^{2} (6.33 sq mi)
- Elevation: 28 m (92 ft)

Population (2025-12-31)
  - Total: 673
  - Density: 41.0/km^{2} (106/sq mi)
- Time zone: UTC+01:00 (CET)
  - Summer (DST): UTC+02:00 (CEST)
- Postal codes: 24409
- Dialling codes: 04643
- Vehicle registration: SL

Stoltebüll (Danish: Stoltebøl) is a municipality in the district of Schleswig-Flensburg, in Schleswig-Holstein, Germany.

The municipality comprises six small villages: Stoltebüll, Gulde, Schrepperie, Schörderup, Vogelsang and Wittkiel. Stoltebüll is located in the east of Anglia, about seven kilometers from the Baltic Sea, in a varied hilly landscape with heights of up to 57 m above sea level. The landscape is characterized by hedgerows, fields, meadows and small forests.

The neoclassical Drült manor house, situated in extensive woodland, was rebuilt in a landscape garden after a fire caused by lightning around 1800. It contains a large library that has been collected over the centuries.

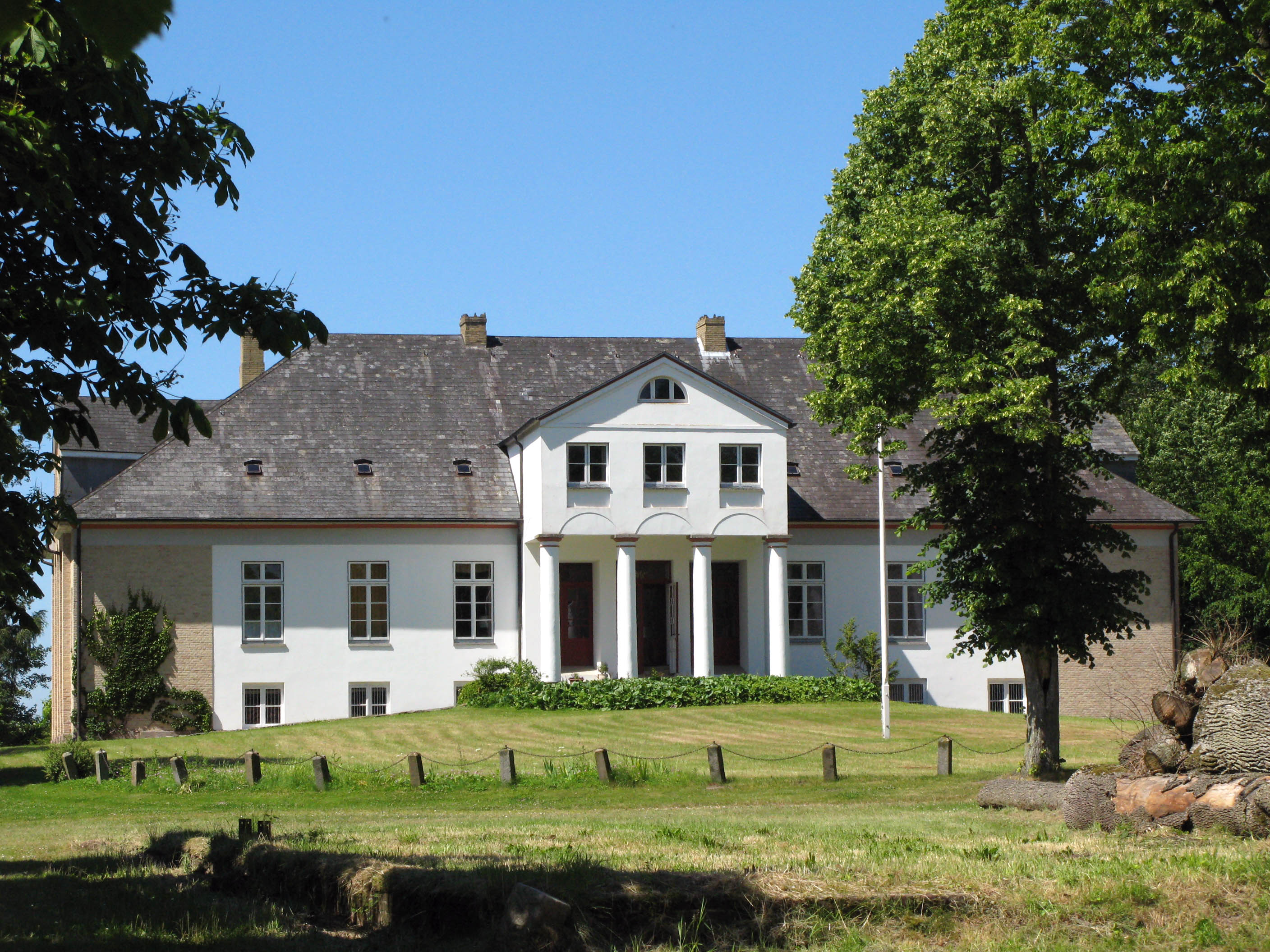
Drült Manor House
