= Sterup =

- Municipality
- Coat of arms

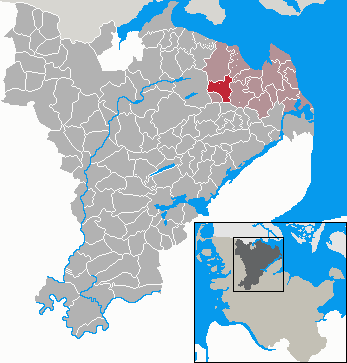
- Location of Sterup within Schleswig-Flensburg district
- Interactive map of Sterup
- Location within Germany Location within Schleswig-Holstein
- Coordinates: 54°43′48″N 9°44′15″E
- Country: Germany
- State: Schleswig-Holstein
- District: Schleswig-Flensburg
- Municipal assoc.: Geltinger Bucht

Government
  - Mayor: Wolfgang Rupp (SPD)

Area
  - Total: 17.14 km^{2} (6.62 sq mi)
- Elevation: 39 m (128 ft)

Population (2025-12-31)
  - Total: 1,445
  - Density: 84.31/km^{2} (218.4/sq mi)
- Time zone: UTC+01:00 (CET)
  - Summer (DST): UTC+02:00 (CEST)
- Postal codes: 24996
- Dialling codes: 04637
- Vehicle registration: SL

Sterup is a municipality in the district of Schleswig-Flensburg, in Schleswig-Holstein, Germany.
