= Wohlde =

- Municipality
- Coat of arms

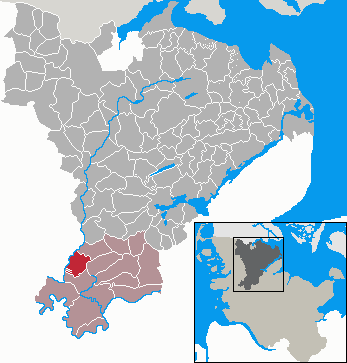
- Location of Wohlde within Schleswig-Flensburg district
- Interactive map of Wohlde
- Location within Germany Location within Schleswig-Holstein
- Coordinates: 54°24′34″N 9°18′1″E
- Country: Germany
- State: Schleswig-Holstein
- District: Schleswig-Flensburg
- Municipal assoc.: Kropp-Stapelholm

Government
  - Mayor: Jochen Tüxsen

Area
  - Total: 14.43 km^{2} (5.57 sq mi)
- Elevation: 6 m (20 ft)

Population (2025-12-31)
  - Total: 518
  - Density: 35.9/km^{2} (93.0/sq mi)
- Time zone: UTC+01:00 (CET)
  - Summer (DST): UTC+02:00 (CEST)
- Postal codes: 24899
- Dialling codes: 04885
- Vehicle registration: SL
- Website: www.kropp.de

Wohlde (Danish: Volde) is a municipality in the district of Schleswig-Flensburg, in Schleswig-Holstein, Germany.
