= Rabel, Schleswig-Holstein =

Rabel Rabøl
- Municipality
- Coat of arms

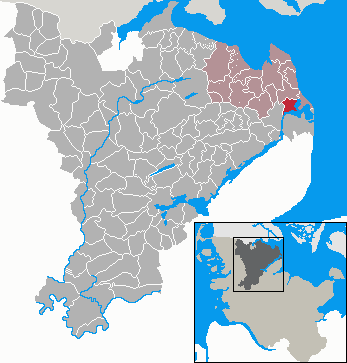
- Location of Rabel within Schleswig-Flensburg district
- Interactive map of Rabel
- Location within Germany Location within Schleswig-Holstein
- Coordinates: 54°41′40″N 9°57′9″E
- Country: Germany
- State: Schleswig-Holstein
- District: Schleswig-Flensburg
- Municipal assoc.: Geltinger Bucht

Government
  - Mayor: Helmuth Meyer

Area
  - Total: 8.84 km^{2} (3.41 sq mi)
- Elevation: 12 m (39 ft)

Population (2025-12-31)
  - Total: 609
  - Density: 68.9/km^{2} (178/sq mi)
- Time zone: UTC+01:00 (CET)
  - Summer (DST): UTC+02:00 (CEST)
- Postal codes: 24376
- Dialling codes: 04642
- Vehicle registration: SL

Rabel (Danish: Rabøl) is a municipality in the district of Schleswig-Flensburg, in Schleswig-Holstein, Germany.
