= Rabenholz =

Rabenholz Ravnholt
- Municipality
- Coat of arms

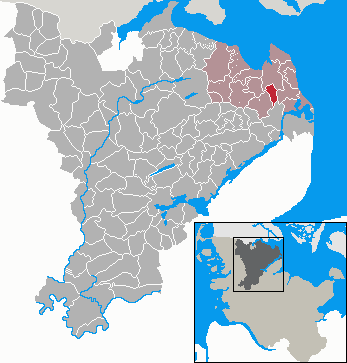
- Location of Rabenholz within Schleswig-Flensburg district
- Interactive map of Rabenholz
- Location within Germany Location within Schleswig-Holstein
- Coordinates: 54°43′N 9°54′E
- Country: Germany
- State: Schleswig-Holstein
- District: Schleswig-Flensburg
- Municipal assoc.: Geltinger Bucht

Government
  - Mayor: Kuno von Kaehne

Area
  - Total: 5.8 km^{2} (2.2 sq mi)
- Elevation: 19 m (62 ft)

Population (2025-12-31)
  - Total: 289
  - Density: 50/km^{2} (130/sq mi)
- Time zone: UTC+01:00 (CET)
  - Summer (DST): UTC+02:00 (CEST)
- Postal codes: 24395
- Dialling codes: 04643
- Vehicle registration: SL

Rabenholz (Danish: Ravnholt) is a municipality in the district of Schleswig-Flensburg, in Schleswig-Holstein, Germany.
