= Tielen, Germany =

Tielen
- Municipality
- Coat of arms

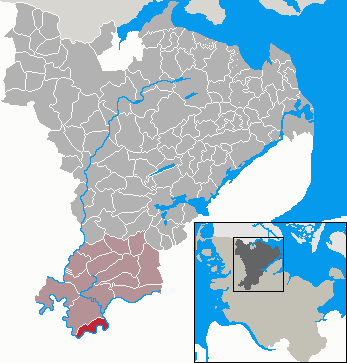
- Location of Tielen within Schleswig-Flensburg district
- Interactive map of Tielen
- Location within Germany Location within Schleswig-Holstein
- Coordinates: 54°17′13″N 9°22′5″E
- Country: Germany
- State: Schleswig-Holstein
- District: Schleswig-Flensburg
- Municipal assoc.: Kropp-Stapelholm

Government
  - Mayor: Sönke Holmsen

Area
  - Total: 13.32 km^{2} (5.14 sq mi)
- Elevation: 4 m (13 ft)

Population (2025-12-31)
  - Total: 297
  - Density: 22.3/km^{2} (57.7/sq mi)
- Time zone: UTC+01:00 (CET)
  - Summer (DST): UTC+02:00 (CEST)
- Postal codes: 24803
- Dialling codes: 04333
- Vehicle registration: SL
- Website: www.kropp.de

Tielen (Danish: Tiele) is a municipality in the district of Schleswig-Flensburg, in Schleswig-Holstein, Germany.
