= Dörpstedt =

- Municipality
- Coat of arms

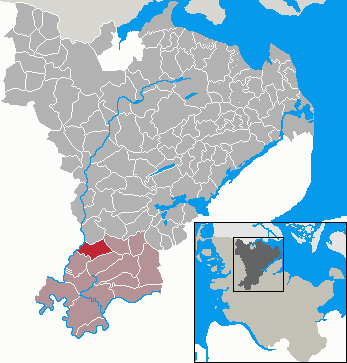
- Location of Dörpstedt within Schleswig-Flensburg district
- Interactive map of Dörpstedt
- Location within Germany Location within Schleswig-Holstein
- Coordinates: 54°26′23″N 9°21′0″E
- Country: Germany
- State: Schleswig-Holstein
- District: Schleswig-Flensburg
- Municipal assoc.: Kropp-Stapelholm

Government
  - Mayor: Klaus Peter Neumann

Area
  - Total: 16.61 km^{2} (6.41 sq mi)
- Elevation: 3 m (9.8 ft)

Population (2025-12-31)
  - Total: 589
  - Density: 35.5/km^{2} (91.8/sq mi)
- Time zone: UTC+01:00 (CET)
  - Summer (DST): UTC+02:00 (CEST)
- Postal codes: 24869
- Dialling codes: 04627
- Vehicle registration: SL
- Website: www.kropp.de

Dörpstedt (Danish: Dørpsted) is a municipality in the district of Schleswig-Flensburg, in Schleswig-Holstein, Germany.
