= Tetenhusen =

- Municipality
- Coat of arms

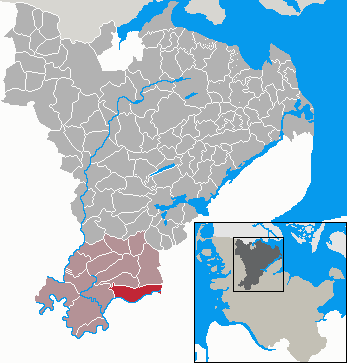
- Location of Tetenhusen within Schleswig-Flensburg district
- Interactive map of Tetenhusen
- Location within Germany Location within Schleswig-Holstein
- Coordinates: 54°21′N 9°30′E
- Country: Germany
- State: Schleswig-Holstein
- District: Schleswig-Flensburg
- Municipal assoc.: Kropp-Stapelholm

Government
  - Mayor: Friedrich Wilhelm Gehrt (FW)

Area
  - Total: 23.13 km^{2} (8.93 sq mi)
- Elevation: 4 m (13 ft)

Population (2025-12-31)
  - Total: 929
  - Density: 40.2/km^{2} (104/sq mi)
- Time zone: UTC+01:00 (CET)
  - Summer (DST): UTC+02:00 (CEST)
- Postal codes: 24817
- Dialling codes: 04624
- Vehicle registration: SL
- Website: www.kropp.de

Tetenhusen (Danish: Tetenhuse) is a municipality in the district of Schleswig-Flensburg, in Schleswig-Holstein, Germany.
