= Ahneby =

Ahneby Åneby
- Municipality
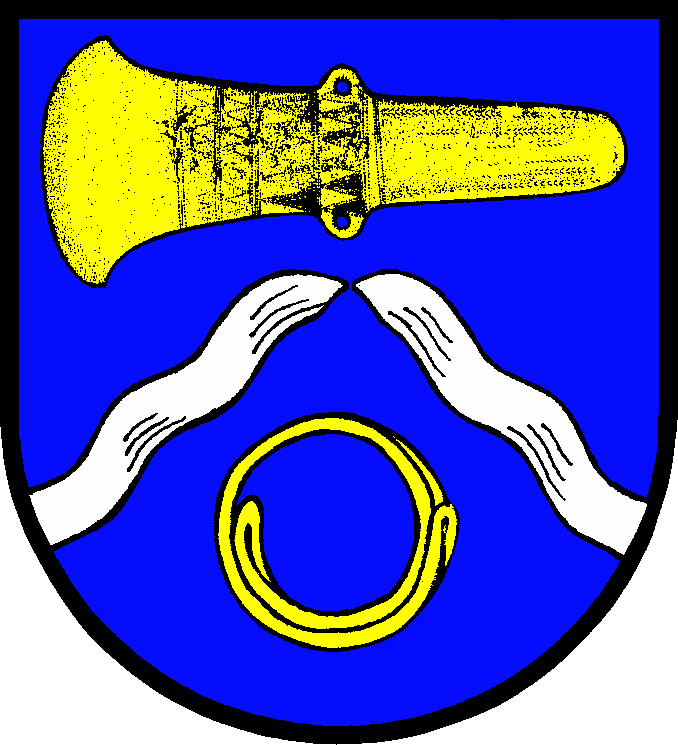
- Coat of arms

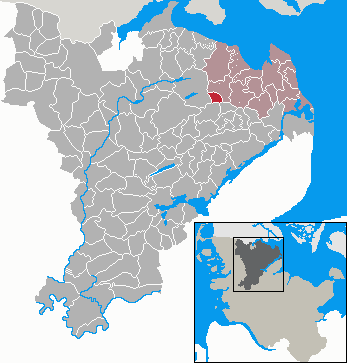
- Location of Ahneby within Schleswig-Flensburg district
- Interactive map of Ahneby
- Location within Germany Location within Schleswig-Holstein
- Coordinates: 54°43′N 9°43′E
- Country: Germany
- State: Schleswig-Holstein
- District: Schleswig-Flensburg
- Municipal assoc.: Geltinger Bucht

Government
  - Mayor: Heinrich Iversen

Area
  - Total: 3.8 km^{2} (1.5 sq mi)
- Elevation: 49 m (161 ft)

Population (2025-12-31)
  - Total: 206
  - Density: 54/km^{2} (140/sq mi)
- Time zone: UTC+01:00 (CET)
  - Summer (DST): UTC+02:00 (CEST)
- Postal codes: 24996
- Dialling codes: 04637
- Vehicle registration: SL

Ahneby (German pronunciation: [ˈaːnəbiː]; Danish: Åneby) is a municipality in Schleswig-Flensburg district, in northern Germany.
