= Kropp-Stapelholm =

- Amt
- Coat of arms

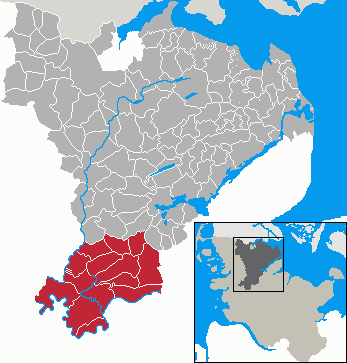
- Map of Schleswig-Flensburg highlighting Kropp-Stapelholm
- Interactive map of Kropp-Stapelholm
- Location within Germany Location within Schleswig-Holstein
- Coordinates: 54°24′N 9°27′E
- Country: Germany
- State: Schleswig-Holstein
- District: Schleswig-Flensburg
- Seat: Kropp
- Subdivisions: 15 Gemeinden

Government
  - Mayor: Ralf Lange

Area
  - Total: 295.30 km^{2} (114.02 sq mi)

Population (2025-12-31)
  - Total: 17,498
  - Density: 59.255/km^{2} (153.47/sq mi)
- Time zone: UTC+01:00 (CET)
  - Summer (DST): UTC+02:00 (CEST)
- Vehicle registration: SL
- Website: www.kropp.de

Kropp-Stapelholm is an Amt ("collective municipality") in the district of Schleswig-Flensburg, in Schleswig-Holstein, Germany. Its seat is in Kropp. It was formed on 1 January 2008 from the former Ämter Kropp and Stapelholm.

== Subdivision ==
The Amt Kropp-Stapelholm consists of the following municipalities:

1. Alt Bennebek
2. Bergenhusen
3. Börm
4. Dörpstedt
5. Erfde
6. Groß Rheide
7. Klein Bennebek
8. Klein Rheide
9. Kropp
10. Meggerdorf
11. Stapel
12. Tetenhusen
13. Tielen
14. Wohlde
