= Alt Bennebek =

- Municipality
- Coat of arms

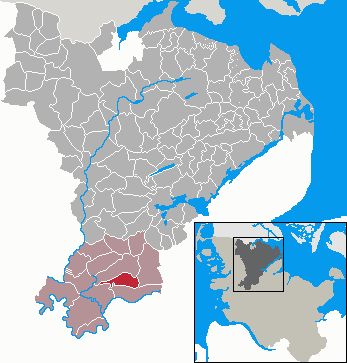
- Location of Alt Bennebek within Schleswig-Flensburg district
- Interactive map of Alt Bennebek
- Location within Germany Location within Schleswig-Holstein
- Coordinates: 54°23′N 9°26′E
- Country: Germany
- State: Schleswig-Holstein
- District: Schleswig-Flensburg
- Municipal assoc.: Kropp-Stapelholm

Government
  - Mayor: Armin Falkenhorst

Area
  - Total: 14.09 km^{2} (5.44 sq mi)
- Elevation: 2 m (6.6 ft)

Population (2025-12-31)
  - Total: 347
  - Density: 24.6/km^{2} (63.8/sq mi)
- Time zone: UTC+01:00 (CET)
  - Summer (DST): UTC+02:00 (CEST)
- Postal codes: 24848
- Dialling codes: 04624
- Vehicle registration: SL
- Website: www.kropp.de

Alt Bennebek (Danish: Gammel Bennebæk) is a municipality in Schleswig-Flensburg district, in Schleswig-Holstein, northern Germany.

Old Bennebek located about 30 km north-west of Rendsburg in the Sorgeniederung on the border between Geest and Marsch. About 15 km to the west, the highway 77 runs and 30 km west, the Federal Highway 7 of Rendsburg to Schleswig.
