= Cordula Kropp =

German sociologist

Cordula Kropp (born 9 March 1966 in Munich) is a German sociologist and professor of sociology with a focus on risk and technology research at the University of Stuttgart. She is the director of Center for Interdisciplinary Risk and Innovation Research (ZIRIUS) at the University of Stuttgart since 2017.

== Life ==
Kropp studied sociology, psychology, ethnology and political science at LMU Munich from 1991 to 1996. She then worked from 1996 to 2001 under the supervision of Ulrich Beck at the Institute of Sociology at LMU Munich in the field of environmental and technological sociology and completed her doctorate with a thesis on nature and politics. From 2002 to 2009, she led various projects on scientific policy advice, sustainable development and risk research at the Munich Project Group for Social Research. She also taught at the Institute of Sociology at LMU Munich as a lecturer for special tasks from 2007 to 2009. Between 2009 and 2016, Kropp held a professorship for social science innovation and futurology at the Faculty of Social Sciences at the Munich University of Applied Sciences and was involved in setting up the Management of Social Innovation course.

Cordula Kropp has held the Chair of Sociology V with a focus on environmental and technology research at the University of Stuttgart since 2016, where she took over from Ortwin Renn. She has been Director of the Center for Interdisciplinary Risk and Innovation Research (ZIRIUS) since 2017 and has been Lead PI for the humanities and social sciences in the Cluster of Excellence Integrative Computational Design and Construction for Architecture (IntCDC) since 2019. Since 2023, Cordula Kropp has been elected as a member of acatech (National Academy of Science and Engineering), which is also considered an award for special scientific excellence. Her work and research focuses on environmental, technological, urban and risk sociology with a focus on infrastructure change, sustainable development and social innovation.

== Selected publications ==
- Cordula Kropp: "Nature": Sociological concepts - political consequences. Leske and Budrich, 2002, ISBN 3-8100-3694-3.
- Cordula Kropp, Frank Schiller, Jost Wagner (eds.): The Future of Knowledge Communication. Perspectives for a reflexive dialog between science and politics - using the example of the agricultural sector. Ed. Sigma, Berlin 2007, ISBN 978-3-8452-6720-3.
- Cordula Kropp, Jost Wagner: Knowledge on the stage: Scientific policy advice. In: Science, Technology & Human Values, No. 35/6, 2010, pp. 812–838 doi:10.1177/0162243909357912
- Cordula Kropp, Gerald Beck: Infrastructures of risk: a mapping approach to controversies about risks. In: Journal of Risk Research, No. 14(1), 2011, p. 1-16 doi:10.1080/13669877.2010.505348
- Cordula Kropp, Gerald Beck (eds.): Gesellschaft innovativ - Wer sind die Akteure? VS Verlag, Wiesbaden 2011, ISBN 978-3-531-94135-6.
- Cordula Kropp, Stefan Böschen, Bernhard Gill, Katrin Vogel (eds.): Climate from below. Regional governance and social change. Campus, Frankfurt a. M. 2014, ISBN 978-3-593-50093-5.
- Cordula Kropp, Irene Antoni-Komar, Colin Sage: Food System Transformations: Social Movements, Local Economies, Collaborative Networks. Routledge, New York/ London 2021, ISBN 978-0-367-67422-9.
- Cordula Kropp, Jan Knippers, Achim Menges, Oliver Sawodny, Oliver Weiskopf: Integratives computerbasiertes Planen und Bauen: Rethinking architecture digitally. 2021 in: Bautechnik. Journal for the entire field of civil engineering. Vol. 98/3, pp. 194–207 doi:10.1002/cend.202100027
- Cordula Kropp, Marco Sonnberger: Environmental sociology. Nomos, Baden-Baden 2021, ISBN 978-3-8452-9207-6.
- Cordula Kropp, Katrin Braun: Building a better world? Promises, Visions, and Imaginaries-in-the-Making of the Digitization of Architecture and Construction. In: Futures 103262, 2023 doi:10.1016/j.futures.2023.103262
