= Erfde =

- Municipality
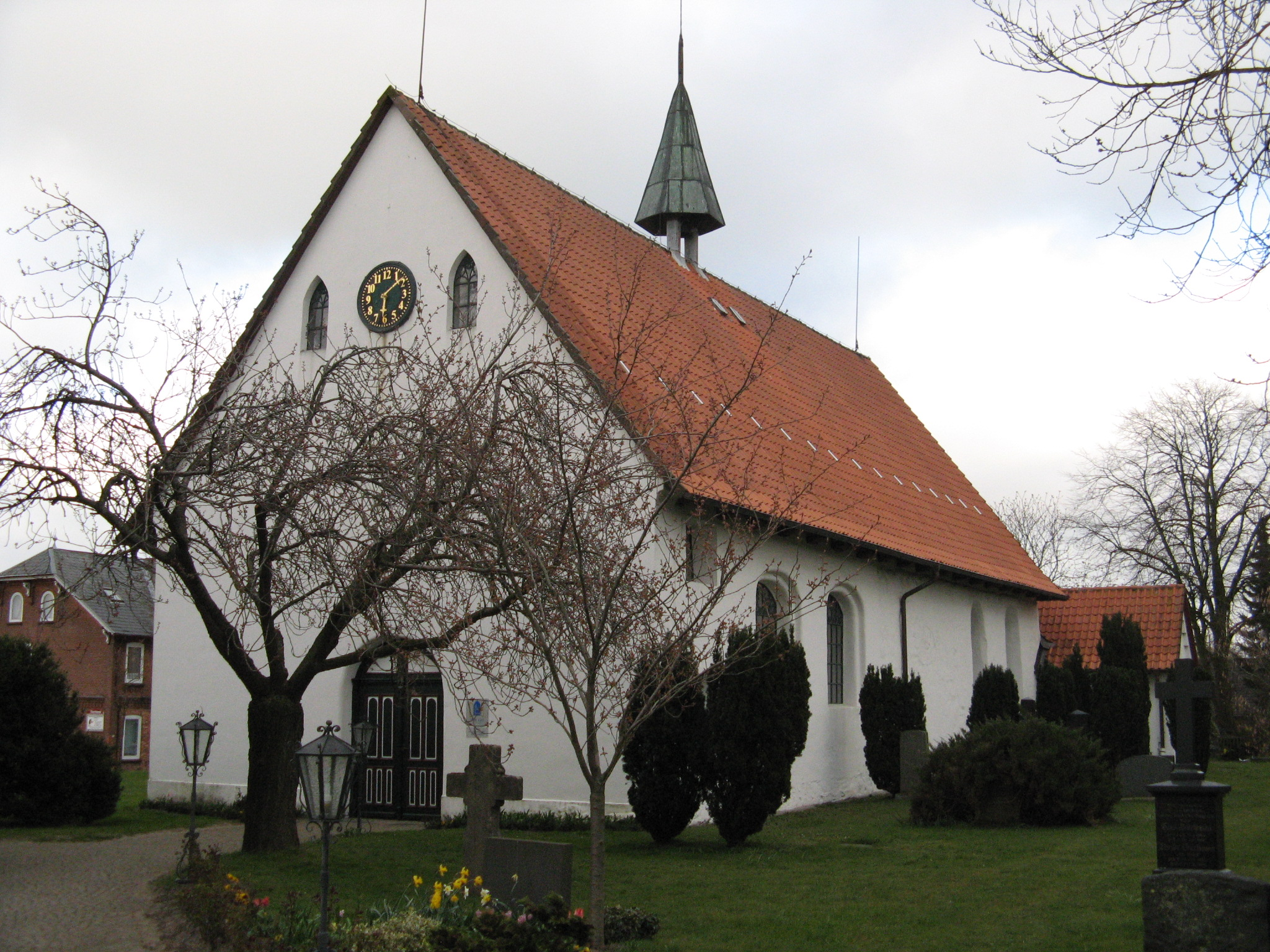
- Church

- Coat of arms

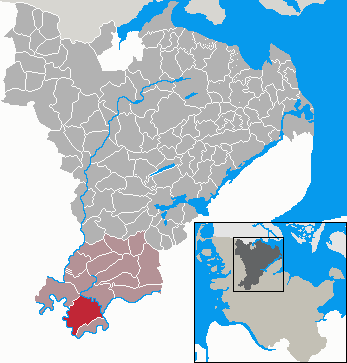
- Location of Erfde within Schleswig-Flensburg district
- Interactive map of Erfde
- Location within Germany Location within Schleswig-Holstein
- Coordinates: 54°18′38″N 9°19′5″E
- Country: Germany
- State: Schleswig-Holstein
- District: Schleswig-Flensburg
- Municipal assoc.: Kropp-Stapelholm

Government
  - Mayor: Jürgen Swazinna

Area
  - Total: 33.95 km^{2} (13.11 sq mi)
- Elevation: 7 m (23 ft)

Population (2025-12-31)
  - Total: 2,270
  - Density: 66.9/km^{2} (173/sq mi)
- Time zone: UTC+01:00 (CET)
  - Summer (DST): UTC+02:00 (CEST)
- Postal codes: 24803
- Dialling codes: 04333
- Vehicle registration: SL
- Website: www.kropp.de

Erfde (Danish: Ervde) is a municipality in the district of Schleswig-Flensburg, in Schleswig-Holstein, Germany.
