= Steinberg, Schleswig-Holstein =

Steinberg Stenbjerg
- Municipality
- Coat of arms

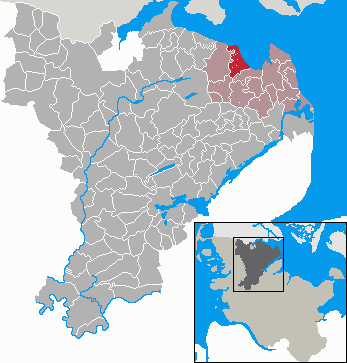
- Location of Steinberg; Stenbjerg within Schleswig-Flensburg district
- Interactive map of Steinberg; Stenbjerg
- Location within Germany Location within Schleswig-Holstein
- Coordinates: 54°46′N 9°46′E
- Country: Germany
- State: Schleswig-Holstein
- District: Schleswig-Flensburg
- Municipal assoc.: Geltinger Bucht

Government
  - Mayor: Gerhard Geißler

Area
  - Total: 16.24 km^{2} (6.27 sq mi)
- Elevation: 9 m (30 ft)

Population (2025-12-31)
  - Total: 834
  - Density: 51.4/km^{2} (133/sq mi)
- Time zone: UTC+01:00 (CET)
  - Summer (DST): UTC+02:00 (CEST)
- Postal codes: 24972
- Dialling codes: 04632
- Vehicle registration: SL

Steinberg (German pronunciation: [ˈʃtaɪ̯nˌbɛʁk], Danish: Stenbjerg) is a municipality in the district of Schleswig-Flensburg, in Schleswig-Holstein, Germany.
