= Marcus Jordanus =

Danish cartographer and mathematician

Marcus Jordanus (* ca. 1531 in Krempe; † 1595 in Krempe) was a Danish cartographer and mathematician.

Jordanus studied at the University of Copenhagen, where in 1550 he was appointed Professor of Mathematics. Among other things, he gave lectures on geodesy and dealt with the geography of Ptolemy. In 1552, he published a map with the printer Hans Vingaard in Copenhagen. This was one of the first printed maps of the Duchies of Schleswig and Holstein, and Abraham Ortelius referred to it in his Catalogus Cartographorum. The map is now lost, and no copies survive.

== Career ==
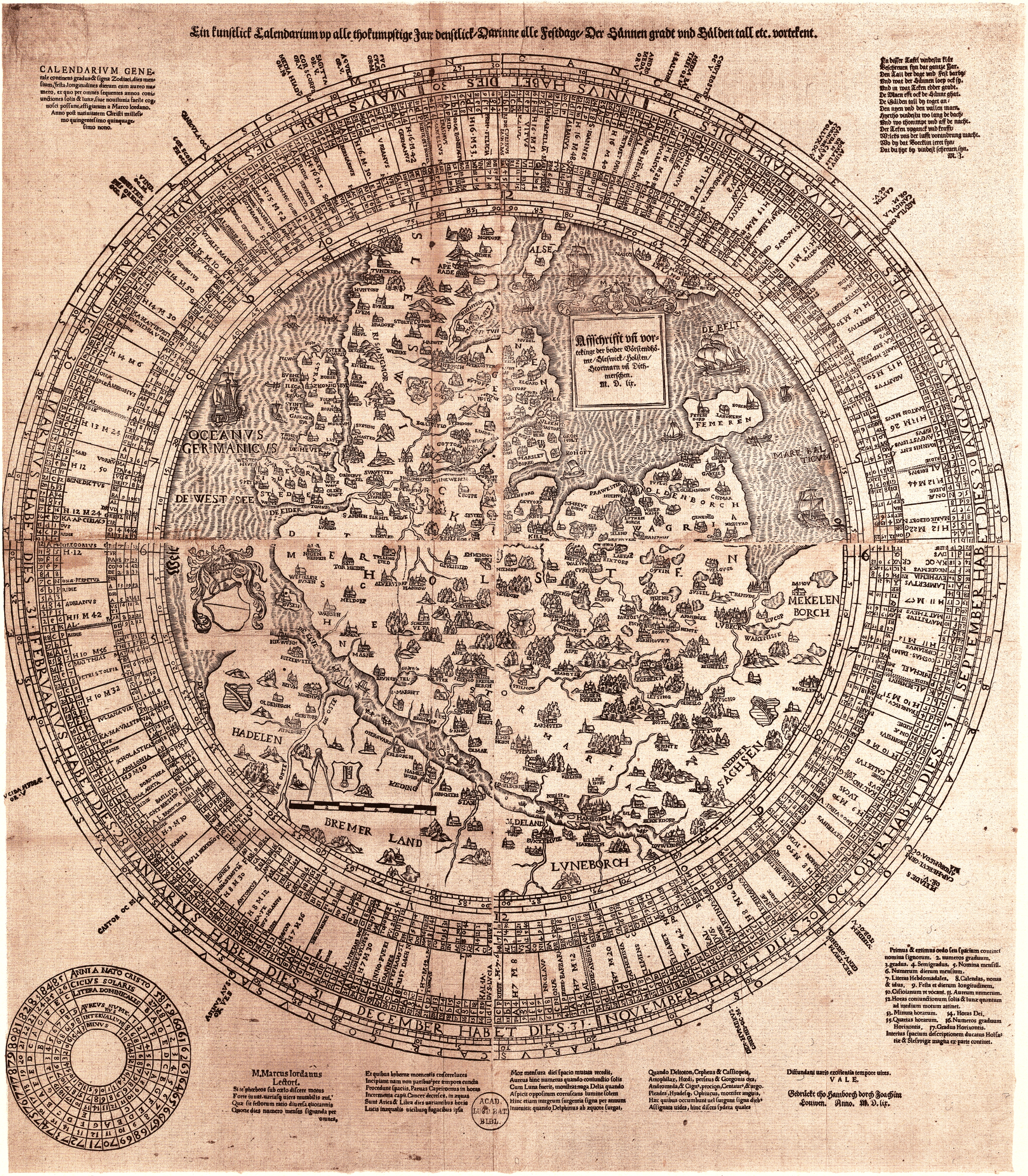
Duchies of Schleswig and Holstein in 1559 with calendar 1558–1585 by Marcus Jordanus

In 1553, Cristian III of Denmark and Norway commissioned Jordanus to visit and map all the provinces of the empire. The resulting map was handed over to the University Library in Copenhagen, but is no longer there. After this commission, the cartographer did not return to the University, but devoted his time to further mapping work. In 1559 he published another map of the Duchies of Schleswig and Holstein. It also included a calendar of 1558 to 1585. There is a copy of this map in the library of the University of Leiden. Jordanus later returned to his birthplace, where he was mayor in 1568 and 1582.

== Bibliography ==
- Bjørnbo, A.A., C.S. Petersen: Anecdota cartografica septentrionlia. Hauniae 1908, p. 8
- Cruse, P.: Die älteste Karte Schleswig-Holsteins aus dem Jahre 1559. In: Schleswigholstein 11 (1959)
- Witt, Reimer: Die Anfänge von Kartographie und Topologie Schleswig-Holsteins 1475–1652, Heide 1982, ISBN 3-8042-0286-1
