= Nieby =

Nieby Nyby
- Municipality
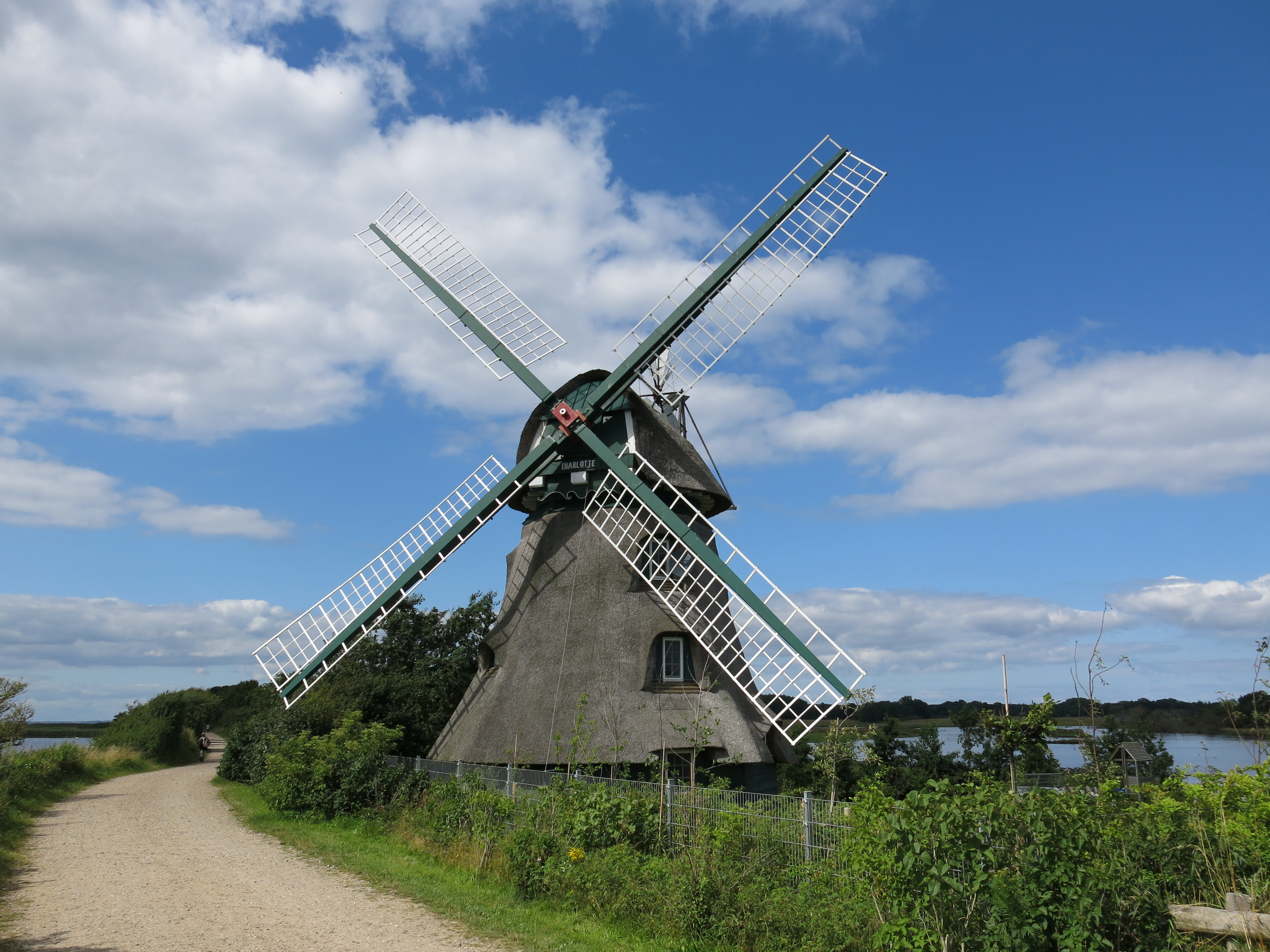
- The windmill "Charlotte" in Nieby

- Coat of arms

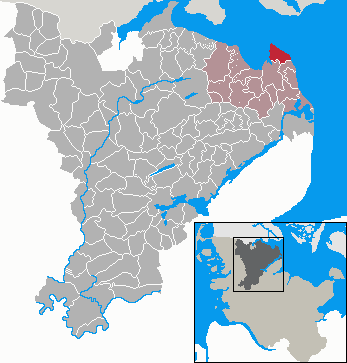
- Location of Nieby; Nyby within Schleswig-Flensburg district
- Interactive map of Nieby; Nyby
- Location within Germany Location within Schleswig-Holstein
- Coordinates: 54°46′N 9°55′E
- Country: Germany
- State: Schleswig-Holstein
- District: Schleswig-Flensburg
- Municipal assoc.: Geltinger Bucht

Government
  - Mayor: Dirk Hansen

Area
  - Total: 8.07 km^{2} (3.12 sq mi)
- Elevation: 9 m (30 ft)

Population (2025-12-31)
  - Total: 135
  - Density: 16.7/km^{2} (43.3/sq mi)
- Time zone: UTC+01:00 (CET)
  - Summer (DST): UTC+02:00 (CEST)
- Postal codes: 24395
- Dialling codes: 04643
- Vehicle registration: SL
- Website: nieby.de

Nieby (German: [ˈniːbiː], Danish: Nyby) is a municipality in the district of Schleswig-Flensburg, in Schleswig-Holstein, Germany.
