= Hasselberg =

- Municipality
- Coat of arms

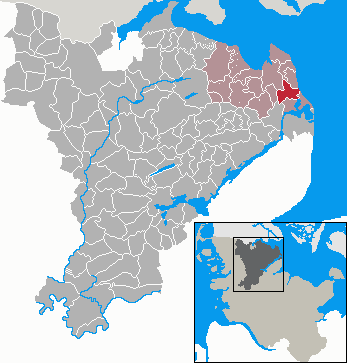
- Location of Hasselberg within Schleswig-Flensburg district
- Interactive map of Hasselberg
- Location within Germany Location within Schleswig-Holstein
- Coordinates: 54°43′N 9°58′E
- Country: Germany
- State: Schleswig-Holstein
- District: Schleswig-Flensburg
- Municipal assoc.: Geltinger Bucht

Government
  - Mayor: Hans-Heinrich Franke

Area
  - Total: 11.3 km^{2} (4.4 sq mi)
- Elevation: 3 m (9.8 ft)

Population (2025-12-31)
  - Total: 927
  - Density: 82.0/km^{2} (212/sq mi)
- Time zone: UTC+01:00 (CET)
  - Summer (DST): UTC+02:00 (CEST)
- Postal codes: 24376
- Dialling codes: 04643
- Vehicle registration: SL

Hasselberg (Danish: Hasselbjerg) is a municipality in the district of Schleswig-Flensburg, in Schleswig-Holstein, Germany.

== Geography ==
The municipality cooperates on an administrative level with the neighboring municipalities in the Gelting Bay community (Amt Geltinger Bucht). Besides the town of Hasselbjerg, the municipality also includes settlements Baggeland (also Bagland, Bag Lunden in German Baggelan), Bobæk (Bobeck), Drejet (Drecht), Eckenhöh (Egehøj, formerly Lille Kidholm), Egebjerg (Eckberg), Engbjerg (Engberg), Eversholt (Ewersholz), Gejlbjerg (Geilberg), Gundelsby, Haberholt (Hafferholz), Gl. Hasselbjerg (Alt Hasselberg), Holm, Hyholt (Hüholz), Kidholm (in Danish also Kiholm, Kieholm), Kirsebærhøj (Kisperhy), Knorløk or Knorlykke (Knorrlück), Markskel (Marschall), Møllemark (Mühlenfeld), Nelslyk (Neelslück), Nørremark (Norderfeld), Pugholt (Pugholz), Raaland (Radeland), Svendsholt(Schwensholz), Svakketorp (Schwackendorf), Skjelrød (Schellrott), Skilleled(Scheideheck), Strengtoft, Søndermark (Süderfeld), Vormshoved (Wormshöft) and Ulvsholt (Wulfsholz).

North of the village on the border with Kronsgaard municipality is the 19 ha protected Færgeskov (also Færensholt, ty. Fehrenholz). At Kidholm, the small Bobæk originates, which after seven km empties into Gelting Nor.

== History ==
Hasselbjerg is first mentioned in 1462. The place name is derived from hassel(English hessel). In older Danish there is also the form Hesselbjerg. In 1535, Haselbjerg is mentioned as a village with 6 farms belonging to Bukhavn estate. In 1609, the village was closed down and turned into a dairy farm. In 1987, the municipality had an area of 1130 ha (including 9 ha of forest) and had 831 inhabitants.
