= Kropp =

- Municipality
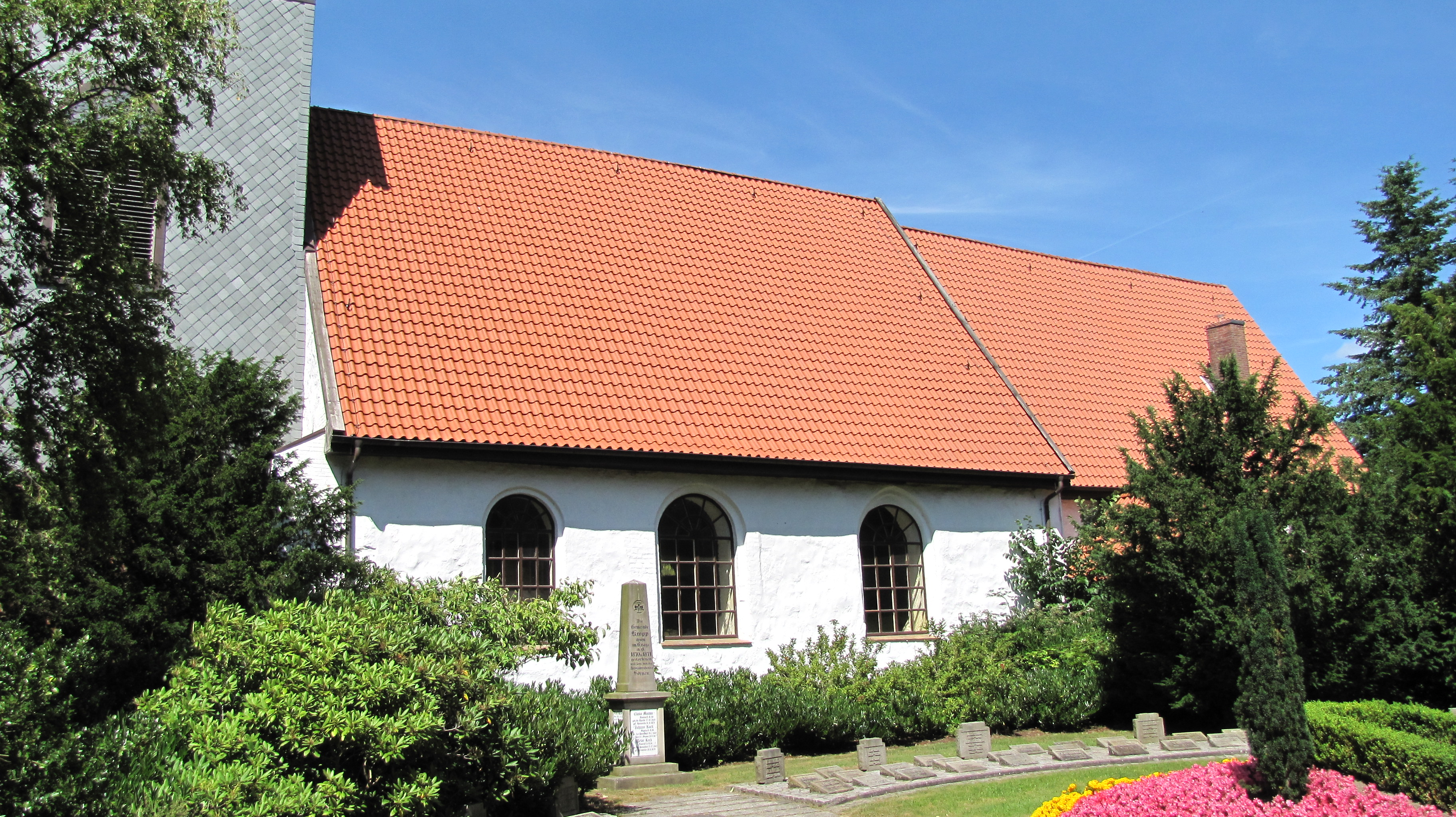
- Kropp Church

- Coat of arms

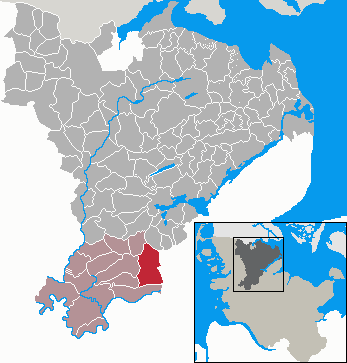
- Location of Kropp within Schleswig-Flensburg district
- Interactive map of Kropp
- Location within Germany Location within Schleswig-Holstein
- Coordinates: 54°25′N 9°31′E
- Country: Germany
- State: Schleswig-Holstein
- District: Schleswig-Flensburg
- Municipal assoc.: Kropp-Stapelholm

Government
  - Mayor: Stefan Ploog

Area
  - Total: 31.94 km^{2} (12.33 sq mi)
- Elevation: 15 m (49 ft)

Population (2025-12-31)
  - Total: 6,620
  - Density: 207/km^{2} (537/sq mi)
- Time zone: UTC+01:00 (CET)
  - Summer (DST): UTC+02:00 (CEST)
- Postal codes: 24848
- Dialling codes: 04624
- Vehicle registration: SL
- Website: www.kropp.de

Kropp (Danish: Krop) is a municipality in the district of Schleswig-Flensburg, in Schleswig-Holstein, Germany. It is situated approximately 13 km south of Schleswig.

Kropp is the seat of the Amt ("collective municipality") Kropp-Stapelholm.
