= Steinbergkirche =

Steinbergkirche Stenbjergkirke
- Municipality
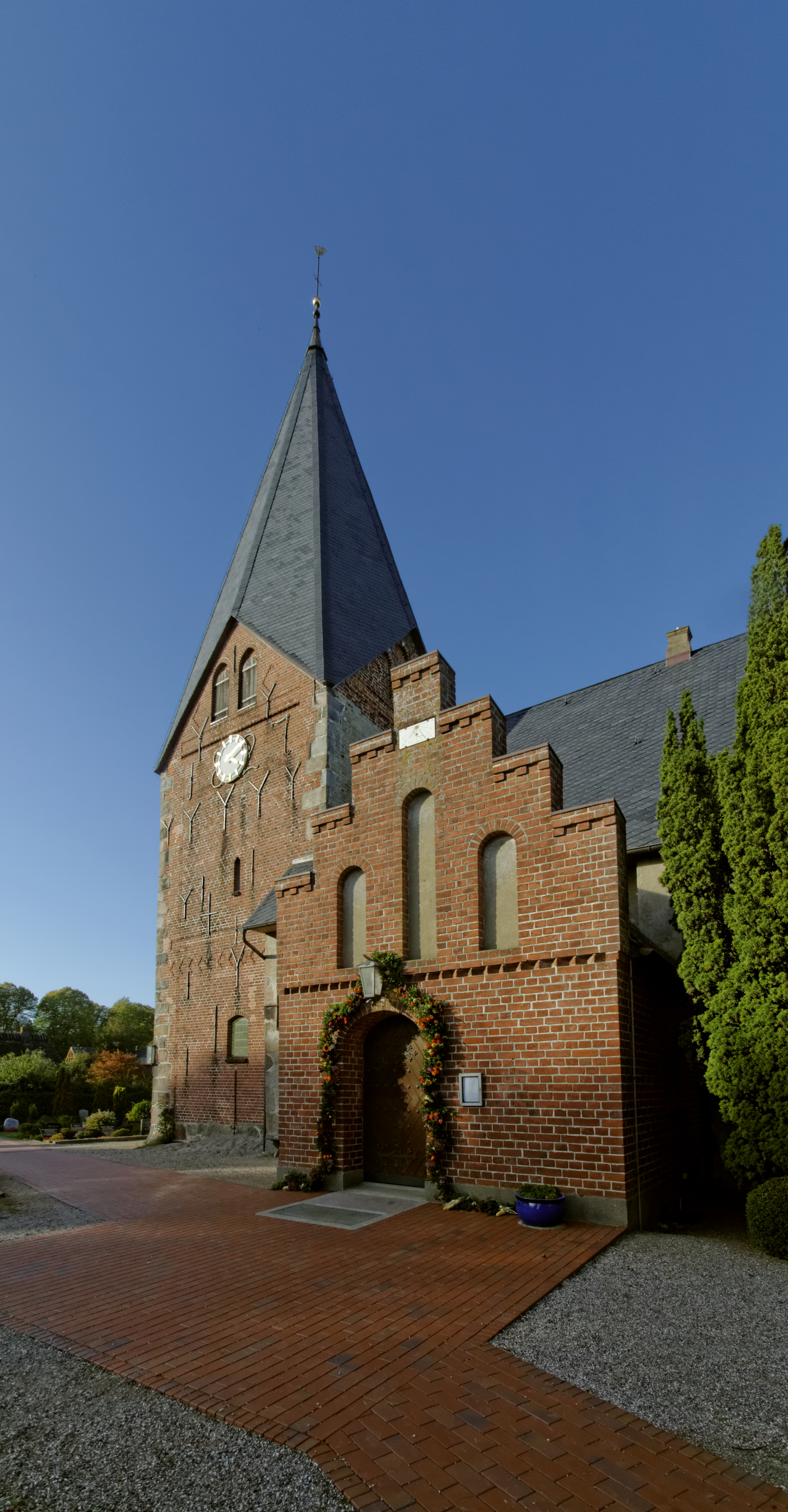

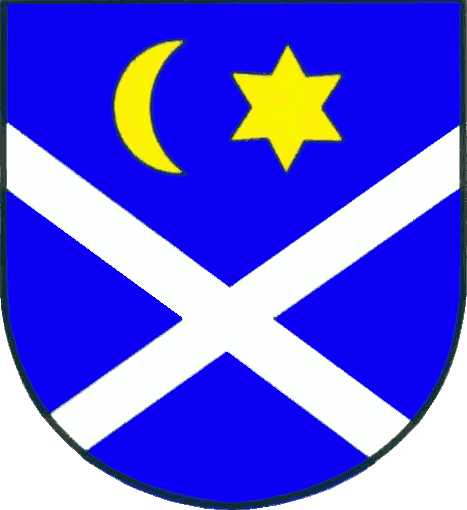
- Coat of arms

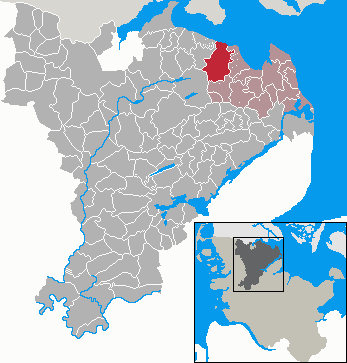
- Location of Steinbergkirche; Stenbjergkirke within Schleswig-Flensburg district
- Interactive map of Steinbergkirche; Stenbjergkirke
- Location within Germany Location within Schleswig-Holstein
- Coordinates: 54°45′21″N 9°45′40″E
- Country: Germany
- State: Schleswig-Holstein
- District: Schleswig-Flensburg
- Municipal assoc.: Geltinger Bucht

Government
  - Mayor: Günter Völkel

Area
  - Total: 35.75 km^{2} (13.80 sq mi)
- Elevation: 43 m (141 ft)

Population (2025-12-31)
  - Total: 2,967
  - Density: 82.99/km^{2} (215.0/sq mi)
- Time zone: UTC+01:00 (CET)
  - Summer (DST): UTC+02:00 (CEST)
- Postal codes: 24972
- Dialling codes: 04632
- Vehicle registration: SL

Steinbergkirche (Danish: Stenbjergkirke) is a municipality in the district of Schleswig-Flensburg, in Schleswig-Holstein, Germany. It is situated near the Baltic Sea coast, approx. 30 km (19 mi) northeast of Schleswig, and 22 km (14 mi) east of Flensburg.

Steinbergkirche is the seat of the Amt ("collective municipality") Geltinger Bucht.
