= Groß Rheide =

Groß Rheide Store Rejde
- Municipality
- Coat of arms

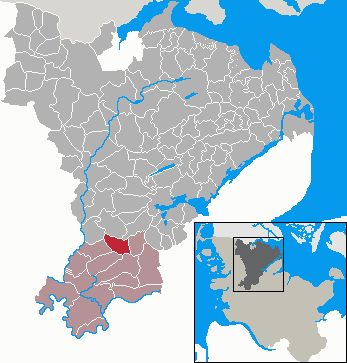
- Location of Groß Rheide; Store Rejde within Schleswig-Flensburg district
- Interactive map of Groß Rheide; Store Rejde
- Location within Germany Location within Schleswig-Holstein
- Coordinates: 54°27′N 9°25′E
- Country: Germany
- State: Schleswig-Holstein
- District: Schleswig-Flensburg
- Municipal assoc.: Kropp-Stapelholm

Government
  - Mayor: Werner Koch

Area
  - Total: 15.37 km^{2} (5.93 sq mi)
- Elevation: 13 m (43 ft)

Population (2025-12-31)
  - Total: 962
  - Density: 62.6/km^{2} (162/sq mi)
- Time zone: UTC+01:00 (CET)
  - Summer (DST): UTC+02:00 (CEST)
- Postal codes: 24872
- Dialling codes: 04624
- Vehicle registration: SL
- Website: www.kropp.de

Groß Rheide (Danish: Store Rejde) is a municipality in the district of Schleswig-Flensburg, in Schleswig-Holstein, Germany.
