= Klein Rheide =

Klein Rheide Lille Rejde
- Municipality
- Coat of arms

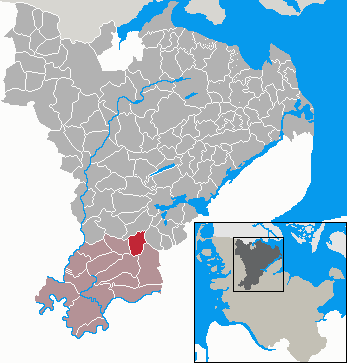
- Location of Klein Rheide; Lille Rejde within Schleswig-Flensburg district
- Interactive map of Klein Rheide; Lille Rejde
- Location within Germany Location within Schleswig-Holstein
- Coordinates: 54°27′7″N 9°28′41″E
- Country: Germany
- State: Schleswig-Holstein
- District: Schleswig-Flensburg
- Municipal assoc.: Kropp-Stapelholm

Government
  - Mayor: Hans-Henning Reimer

Area
  - Total: 12.82 km^{2} (4.95 sq mi)
- Elevation: 17 m (56 ft)

Population (2025-12-31)
  - Total: 331
  - Density: 25.8/km^{2} (66.9/sq mi)
- Time zone: UTC+01:00 (CET)
  - Summer (DST): UTC+02:00 (CEST)
- Postal codes: 24848
- Dialling codes: 04624
- Vehicle registration: SL
- Website: www.kropp.de

Klein Rheide (Danish: Lille Rejde) is a municipality in the district of Schleswig-Flensburg, in Schleswig-Holstein, Germany.
