= Bergenhusen =

- Municipality
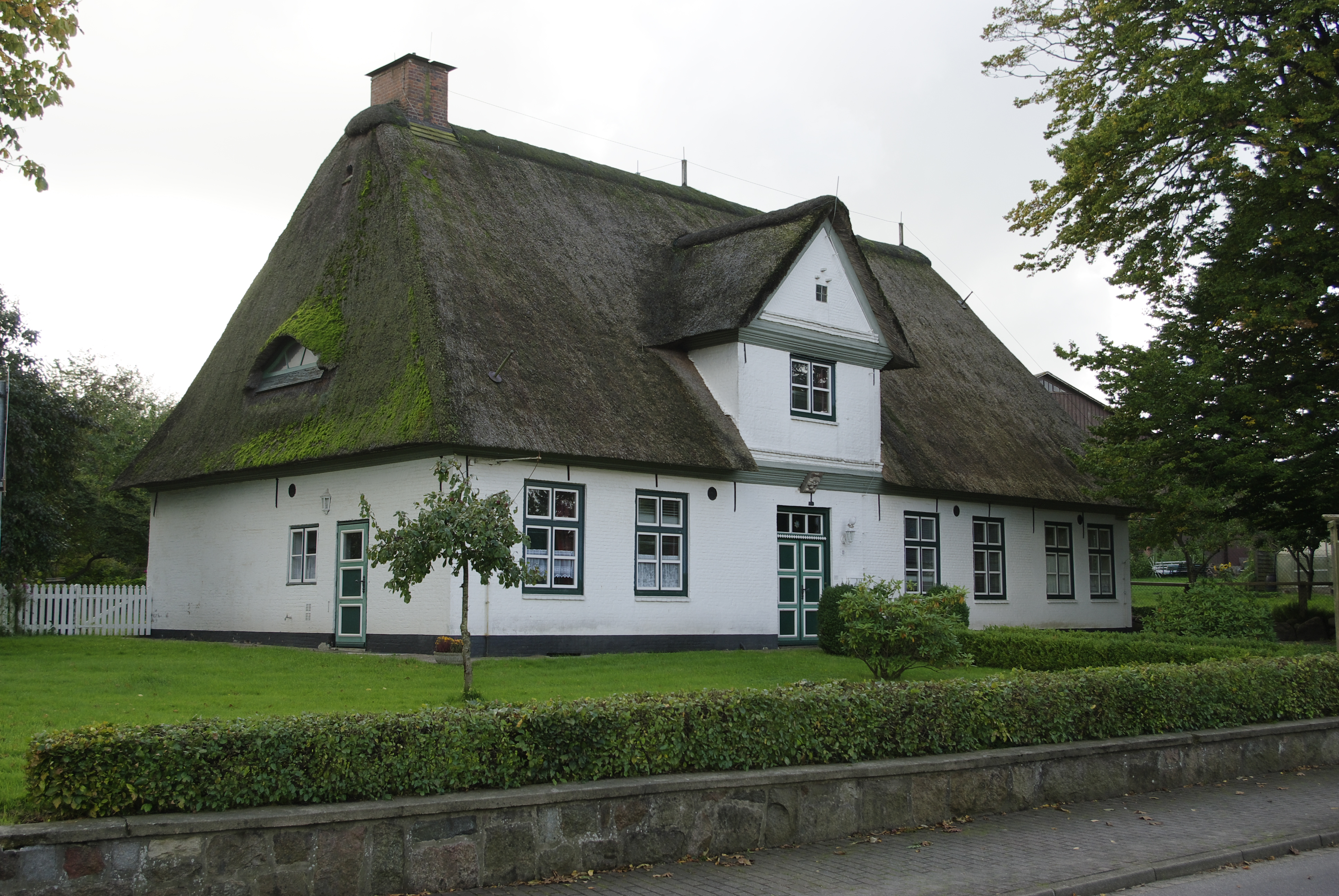
- Old parsonage in Bergenhusen

- Coat of arms

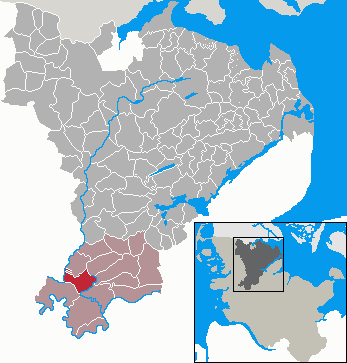
- Location of Bergenhusen within Schleswig-Flensburg district
- Interactive map of Bergenhusen
- Location within Germany Location within Schleswig-Holstein
- Coordinates: 54°22′37″N 9°19′1″E
- Country: Germany
- State: Schleswig-Holstein
- District: Schleswig-Flensburg
- Municipal assoc.: Kropp-Stapelholm

Government
  - Mayor: Helmut Schriever

Area
  - Total: 18.22 km^{2} (7.03 sq mi)
- Elevation: 4 m (13 ft)

Population (2025-12-31)
  - Total: 728
  - Density: 40.0/km^{2} (103/sq mi)
- Time zone: UTC+01:00 (CET)
  - Summer (DST): UTC+02:00 (CEST)
- Postal codes: 24861
- Dialling codes: 04885
- Vehicle registration: SL
- Website: bergenhusen.de

Bergenhusen (Danish: Berringhuse) is a municipality in the district of Schleswig-Flensburg, in Schleswig-Holstein, Germany.
