= Schleswig-Flensburg =

Coordinates: 54°40′N 9°35′E

- District
- Flag Coat of arms

- Country: Germany
- State: Schleswig-Holstein
- Capital: Schleswig

Government
  - District admin.: Wolfgang Buschmann

Area
  - Total: 2,072 km^{2} (800 sq mi)

Population (31 December 2022)
  - Total: 206,038
  - Density: 99/km^{2} (260/sq mi)
- Time zone: UTC+01:00 (CET)
  - Summer (DST): UTC+02:00 (CEST)
- Vehicle registration: SL
- Website: schleswig-flensburg.de

Schleswig-Flensburg (German pronunciation: [ˈʃleːsvɪç ˈflɛnsbʊʁk]; Danish: Slesvig-Flensborg) is a district in Schleswig-Holstein, Germany. It is bounded by (from the south and clockwise) the districts of Rendsburg-Eckernförde, Dithmarschen and Nordfriesland, the Region Syddanmark in Denmark, the city of Flensburg and the Baltic Sea.

== History ==
Written history in the area began about 800 AD, when the Danish Viking settlement of Haithabu was founded. Later the neighbouring city of Schleswig took the place of Haithabu and became a powerful town in the 11th century. It later lost its power to Lübeck.

The district was established in 1974 by merging the former districts of Flensburg-Land and Schleswig. Due to the proximity of Denmark and the regional history there is a large percentage of Danish inhabitants.

== Geography ==
The countryside is generally plain. The Schlei, an inlet of the Baltic Sea, is the southern border of this district. All the land north of the Schlei and south of Flensburg is called the peninsula of Angeln. Angeln was the ancient home of the Germanic people known as the Angles, who migrated to England in the early Middle Ages.

== Coat of arms ==
The coat of arms displays two lions, symbolizing the old duchy of Schleswig. At the bottom of the arms there is a wavy line symbolizing the Baltic Sea and its firths.

== Towns and municipalities ==
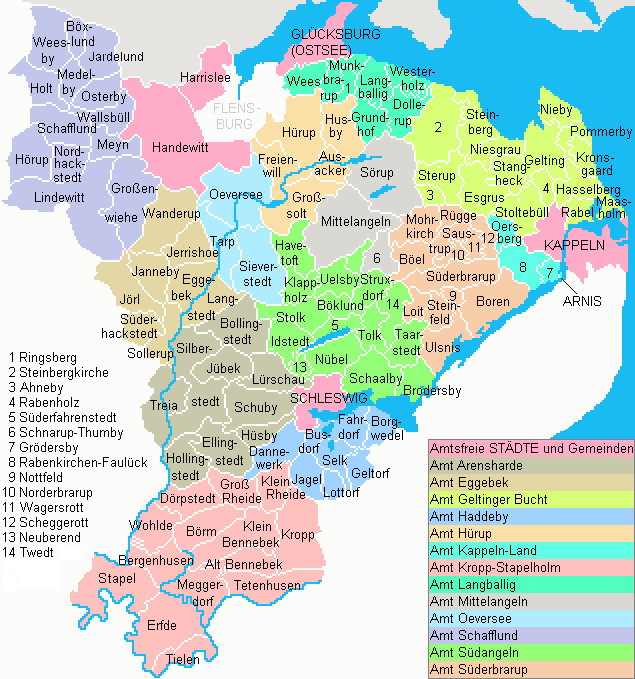

Independent towns and municipalities
1. Glücksburg
2. Kappeln
3. Schleswig
4. Handewitt
5. Harrislee

Ämter
| 1. Arensharde; 1. Bollingstedt; 2. Ellingstedt; 3. Hollingstedt; 4. Hüsby; 5. Jübek; 6. Lürschau; 7. Schuby; 8. Silberstedt^{1}; 9. Treia; 2. Eggebek; 1. Eggebek^{1}; 2. Janneby; 3. Jerrishoe; 4. Jörl; 5. Langstedt; 6. Sollerup; 7. Süderhackstedt; 8. Wanderup; 3. Geltinger Bucht; 1. Ahneby; 2. Esgrus; 3. Gelting; 4. Hasselberg; 5. Kronsgaard; 6. Maasholm; 7. Nieby; 8. Niesgrau; 9. Pommerby; 10. Rabel; 11. Rabenholz; 12. Stangheck; 13. Steinberg; 14. Steinbergkirche^{1}; 15. Sterup; 16. Stoltebüll; 4. Haddeby; 1. Borgwedel; 2. Busdorf^{1}; 3. Dannewerk; 4. Fahrdorf; 5. Geltorf; 6. Jagel; 7. Lottorf; 8. Selk | 5. Hürup; 1. Ausacker; 2. Freienwill; 3. Großsolt; 4. Hürup^{1}; 5. Husby; 6. Kappeln-Land [seat: Kappeln]; 1. Arnis^{2}; 2. Grödersby; 3. Oersberg; 4. Rabenkirchen-Faulück; 7. Kropp-Stapelholm; 1. Alt Bennebek; 2. Bergenhusen; 3. Börm; 4. Dörpstedt; 5. Erfde; 6. Groß Rheide; 7. Klein Bennebek; 8. Klein Rheide; 9. Kropp^{1}; 10. Meggerdorf; 11. Stapel; 12. Tetenhusen; 13. Tielen; 14. Wohlde; 8. Langballig; 1. Dollerup; 2. Grundhof; 3. Langballig^{1}; 4. Munkbrarup; 5. Ringsberg; 6. Wees; 7. Westerholz; 9. Mittelangeln; 1. Mittelangeln^{1}; 2. Schnarup-Thumby; 3. Sörup; 10. Oeversee; 1. Oeversee; 2. Sieverstedt; 3. Tarp^{1} | 11. Schafflund; 1. Böxlund; 2. Großenwiehe; 3. Hörup; 4. Holt; 5. Jardelund; 6. Lindewitt; 7. Medelby; 8. Meyn; 9. Nordhackstedt; 10. Osterby; 11. Schafflund^{1}; 12. Wallsbüll; 13. Weesby; 12. Südangeln; 1. Böklund^{1}; 2. Brodersby-Goltoft; 3. Havetoft; 4. Idstedt; 5. Klappholz; 6. Neuberend; 7. Nübel; 8. Schaalby; 9. Stolk; 10. Struxdorf; 11. Süderfahrenstedt; 12. Taarstedt; 13. Tolk; 14. Twedt; 15. Uelsby; 13. Süderbrarup; 1. Böel; 2. Boren; 3. Loit; 4. Mohrkirch; 5. Norderbrarup; 6. Nottfeld; 7. Rügge; 8. Saustrup; 9. Scheggerott; 10. Steinfeld; 11. Süderbrarup^{1}; 12. Ulsnis; 13. Wagersrott |
^{1}seat of the Amt;^{2}town
