= Munkwolstrup =

- Ortsteil of Oeversee
- Interactive map of Munkwolstrup
- Location within Germany Location within Schleswig-Holstein
- Coordinates: 54°43′25″N 9°27′15″E
- Country: Germany
- State: Schleswig-Holstein
- Municipality: Oeversee
- Elevation: 40 m (130 ft)
- Time zone: UTC+01:00 (CET)
  - Summer (DST): UTC+02:00 (CEST)
- Postal codes: 24988
- Dialling codes: 04602

Munkwolstrup (Danish: Munkvolstrup) is a village of Schleswig-Holstein that is part of the municipality of Oeversee.

== Location ==
Two kilometers to the east of Munkwolstrup are the villages of Freienwill and Kleinwolstrup. Oeversee lies 1.5 kilometers south. The city boundaries of Flensburg are three kilometers to the north.

== Background ==
Megalithic burial sites in the village evidence Neolithic activity in the area.

Munkwolstrup was first mentioned in 1352. The first part of the name derives from the word monk: during the Middle Ages, the village belonged to the Cistercian monks of Ryd Abbey.

The village can be found on Prussian and Danish maps dating 1857/1858 and 1879, respectively.

=== Administrative reforms ===
- 1 January 1962: Juhlschau becomes part of Munkwolstrup
- 1974: Munkwolstrup and Barderup merge to create the municipality of Sankelmark
- 2008: Sankelmark becomes part of Oeversee
