= Juhlschau =

- Ortsteil of Oeversee
- Interactive map of Juhlschau
- Location within Germany Location within Schleswig-Holstein
- Coordinates: 54°42′49″N 9°28′03″E
- Country: Germany
- State: Schleswig-Holstein
- District: Schleswig-Flensburg
- Municipality: Oeversee
- Elevation: 40 m (130 ft)
- Time zone: UTC+01:00 (CET)
  - Summer (DST): UTC+02:00 (CEST)
- Postal codes: 24988
- Dialling codes: 04602

Juhlschau (Danish: Julskov) is a village in Schleswig-Holstein that is part of the municipality of Oeversee.

	Hills
Oeversee (2km) via the Juhlschauer Weg that passes through Munkwolstrup	Juhlschau	Kleinsolt-Heidefeld (part of Freienwill)
	Augaard

== Geography ==
Hills up to 65 metres (213 ft) high lie north-west of the village.

== History ==
Juhlschau was first documented in the year 1472. The name combines two parts, the first of which, "Jul" (or "Juhl" in German) either comes from the male first name Jul or the Danish word hjul (=wheel). The second part "-schau" is thought to derive from the Danish word "skov" for forest. Historians propose a translation of the hamlet's name such as "round forest" or "the forest from which wood was taken to make cart wheels"

A local saying goes "In Juhlschau hebt se Appeln und Beern, in Augaard wohnt de Eddellüd gern", which means "In Juhlschau, they've got apples and pears, in Augaard the noble reside".

The village can be found on Prussian and Danish maps dating 1857/1858 and 1879, respectively.

In the 1920 Schleswig referendum, the vast majority of the village's population voted to remain part of Germany. Of the 51 who voted, only three spoke out in support of Denmark. Up until the early 1960s, the neighbouring Augaard, was part of Juhlschau

In 1961 the hamlet numbered 71 people, with 50 more in Augaard In 1970, Juhlschau's population had slightly decreased to 69.

=== Administrative Changes ===
- 1 January 1962: Juhlschau becomes part of Munkwolstrup
- 1974: Munkwolstrup and Barderup merge to create the municipality of Sankelmark
- 2008: Sankelmark becomes part of Oeversee. Since then, Juhlschau is an Ortsteil of Oeversee.
