= Augaard =

- Ortsteil of Oeversee
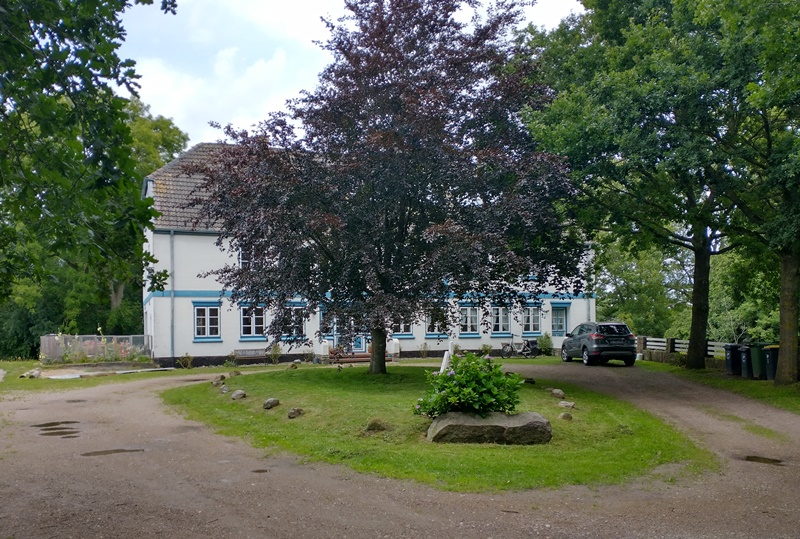
- The old danish school's building
- Interactive map of Augaard
- Location within Germany Location within Schleswig-Holstein
- Coordinates: 54°42′07″N 9°27′48″E
- Country: Germany
- State: Schleswig-Holstein
- Municipality: Oeversee
- Elevation: 27 m (89 ft)
- Time zone: UTC+01:00 (CET)
  - Summer (DST): UTC+02:00 (CEST)
- Postal codes: 24988
- Dialling codes: 04602

Augaard (Danish: Ågård) is a village in Schleswig-Holstein, Germany, that belongs to the municipality of Oeversee.

== History ==
Augaard was first attested in a document from the year 1337. The name combines two words, with Au being a common name for a river and Ga(a)rd meaning yard. Thus, the name could be translated as "yard at the river", possibly referring to the nearby Treene stream.

According to a local legend, a castle once stood in Augaard. Historian Jakob Röschmann however calls this a hoax. The castle is referred to by locals as "De Borg" It is said that the castle's grounds was a peninsula-like hill measuring roughly 100 meters across (54.700682°N 9.461894°E). Furthermore, a golden sword is said to be buried at the site.

A local saying goes "In Juhlschau hebt se Appeln und Beern, in Augaard wohnt de Eddellüd gern", which means "In Juhlschau, they've got apples and pears, in Augaard the noble reside"

It is attested that the county administrator of Uggelharde resided in Augaard for multiple years. The village can be found on Prussian and Danish maps dating 1857/1858 and 1879, respectively.

In Augaard, the first Volkshochschule of Schleswig that was teaching in Danish opened in 1863, the Aagaard Højskole. Though, it was shut down and closed by Prussian authorities in 1889

=== Administrative history ===
Up until the 1960s, Augaard was part of the municipality of Juhlschau that was merged into Munkwolstrup on 1 January 1962. With a municipal reform in 1974, the latter was merged with the neighboring village of Barderup to create the municipality of Sankelmark. Sankelmark itself was merged into the Oeversee municipality in another reform in 2008.

== Notable residents ==
- Friedrich Wilhelm Lübke, Minister-president of Schleswig-Holstein from 1951 to 1954 owned a farm in Augaard.
- His brother Heinrich Lübke (President of West Germany from 1959 to 1969) lived at that farm briefly in the 1930s.
