= Tybjerg =

Tybjerg may refer to:

== Places ==
- Tybjerg, a village in Denmark

== Buildings ==
- Tybjerg Church, a church
- Tybjerg Manor, a manor house and estate

== People ==
- Clara Tybjerg, Danish women's right activist
