= Aagaard (disambiguation) =

Aagaard is a surname.

Aagaard may also refer to:

- Aagaard (manor house), an estate in Gørlev, Denmark
- Aagaard Glacier, in Graham Land, Antarctica
- Aagaard Islands, in the Southern Ocean off Antarctica

== See also ==
- Ågård, Denmark, a village in Vejle Municipality
- Augaard, a village in Schleswig-Holstein, Germany
- Douglas Aagard (born 1954), American politician from Utah
- Julie Dahle Aagård (born 1978), Norwegian jazz musician
