= Tåstrup (disambiguation) =

Tåstrup or Taastrup may refer to:

- Taastrup - western suburb of København
- Tåstrup (Feldballe Parish), a hamlet and a houseowners' association in Feldballe Parish
- Tåstrup (Harlev Parish), a hamlet and a houseowners' association in Harlev Parish
- Tåstrup (Hellested Parish), a hamlet and a houseowners' association in Hellested Parish
- Tåstrup (Hyllinge Parish), a hamlet and a houseowners' association in Hyllinge Parish
- Tåstrup (Jystrup Parish), a hamlet and a houseowners' association in Jystrup Parish
- Tåstrup (Keldby Parish), a hamlet and a houseowners' association in Keldby Parish
- Tåstrup (Lille Lyngby Parish), a hamlet in Lille Lyngby Parish
- Tåstrup (Lunde Parish), a hamlet and a houseowners' association in Lunde Parish
- Tåstrup (Tveje Merløse Parish), a hamlet and a houseowners' association n Tveje Merløse Parish
- Tåstrup (Ødum Parish), a hamlet and a houseowners' association in Ødum Parish

== See also ==
- Nørre Tåstrup, en bebyggelse i Horbelev Parish
- Tostrup Castle, a castle in Ingelsted Herred, Skåne
- Tastrup
