= Adam Knuth =

Adam Knuth may refer to:

- Adam Christopher Knuth (1687–1736), Count of Knuthenborg
- Adam Levin Knuth (1648–1699), Danish landowner, county governor and Supreme Court justice
