= Kleinwolstrup =

- Ortsteil of Freienwill
- Interactive map of Kleinwolstrup
- Location within Germany Location within Schleswig-Holstein
- Coordinates: 54°44′07″N 9°29′32″E
- Country: Germany
- State: Schleswig-Holstein
- District: Schleswig-Flensburg
- Municipal assoc.: Hürup
- Municipality: Freienwill
- Time zone: UTC+01:00 (CET)
  - Summer (DST): UTC+02:00 (CEST)
- Postal codes: 24991
- Dialling codes: 04602

Kleinwolstrup (rarely also: Klein Wolstrup; Danish: Lille Volstrup) is an Ortsteil of the municipality of Freienwill.

== History ==
Megalithic burial sites in the village evidence Neolithic activity in the area.

The meaning of the name Kleinwolstrup can be broken down as follows: "Klein" is a size indicator literally translating to "small" in German, "Wol" or "Wal" is thought to be a family name, and the ending "-trup", is German for Thorp, a small village. The name would translate to "Little Village of the Wol".

Another theory suggests that "wol" could stem from low German "Wo(h)ld" for forest. Examples of local toponomies having that etymology include Wohlde and the Dänischen Wohld. In that case, Kleinwolstrup translates to "little village by the forest." In fact, a small forest lies north of the hamlet.

Over the course of centuries, Kleinwolstrup developed into a cramped village that has no buildings of significant age preserved today. A NATO bunker was erected after the Second World War near the village.

In 1961, the population numbered 431. In 1970 it stood at 347. As part of a municipal reform in 1974, Kleinwolstrup and the village of Kleinsolt were merged to create the municipality of Freienwill. In the latters coat of arms, Kleinwolstrup is represented by an oak twig.
