= Battle of Sankelmark =

Battle of the Second Schleswig War

Coordinates: 54°43′03″N 9°26′38″E

- Part of the Second Schleswig War
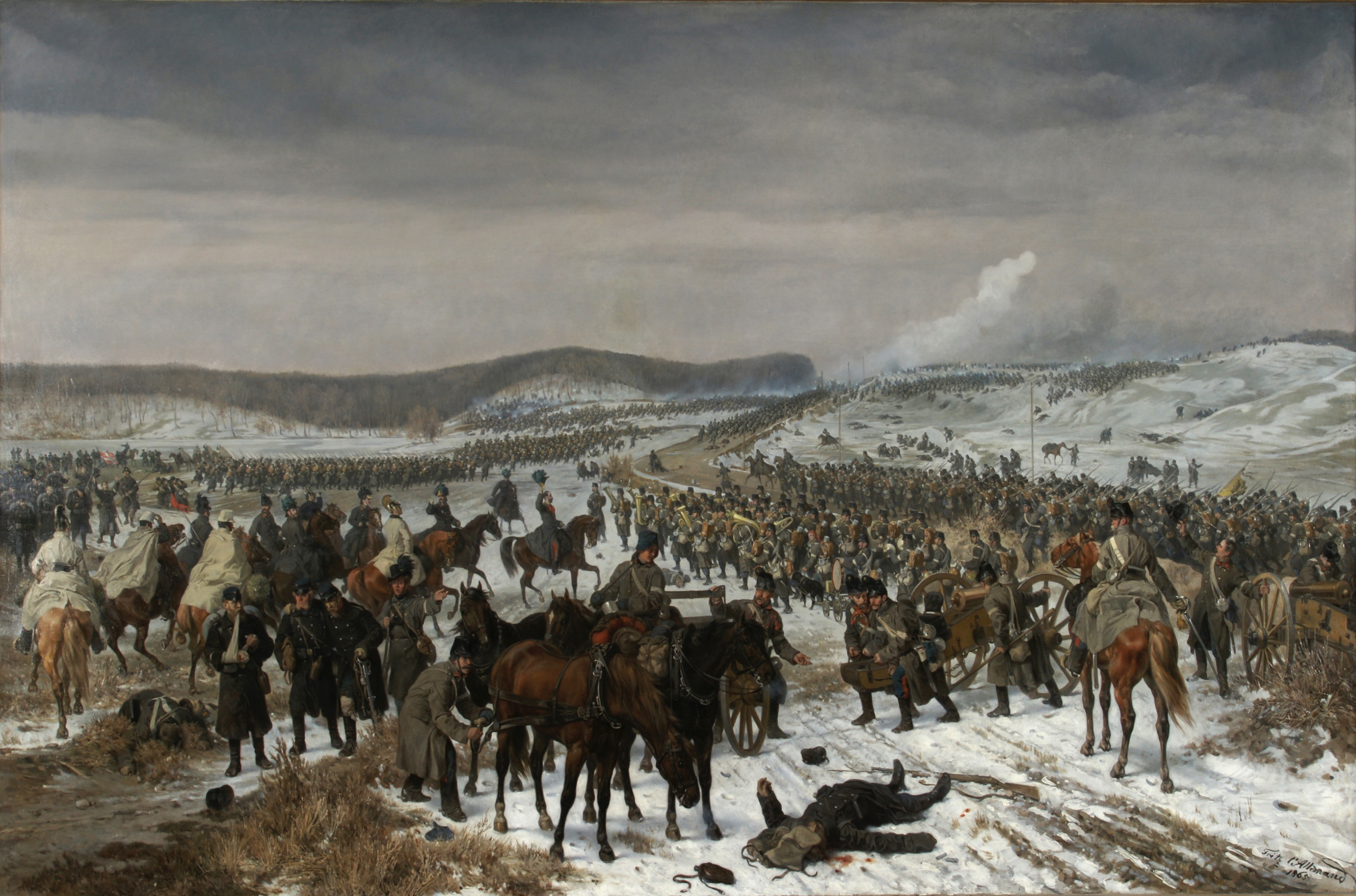
- The Battle of Oeversee on 6 February 1864; Fritz L'Allemand, 1865
Date	6 February 1864
Location	Sankelmark and Oeversee
Result	See aftermath

Belligerents
Austria	Denmark

Commanders and leaders
Ludwig von Gablenz	Peter F. Steinmann; Max Müller

Strength
2 brigades including artillery	7th Brigade

Casualties and losses
95 killed 311 wounded 27 missing Total: 433 killed, wounded or missing	53 killed 157 wounded 553 captured Total: 763 killed, wounded or captured

The Battle of Sankelmark (or Battle of Oeversee) was a minor battle during the Second Schleswig War. It took place on 6 February 1864 between Sankelmark and Oeversee, on the road between Schleswig and Flensburg, during the Danish retreat from the Danevirke.

== Background ==
The Danish army, under General Christian Julius De Meza had taken up position at the defenses of the Danevirke and had managed to hold the Prussians at bay at the Battle of Mysunde on 2 February. However, two days later, the Prussians managed to cross the Schlei, threatening the Danes with encirclement. With the lack of heavy artillery and judging that the Danevirke's fortifications were insufficient for a successful defense, De Meza decided the position was untenable and ordered a withdrawal to preserve the army's intactness and prevent an encirclement. The withdrawal of the Danish army to Dybbøl began on 4 February. The Danish troops withdrew through freezing weather. Austrian troops were dispatched in pursuit and in response, the 7th Brigade of the Danish army was ordered to stop the Austrians. Austrian troops reached the Danish rearguard near Sankelmark in the afternoon of 6 February.

== Battle ==
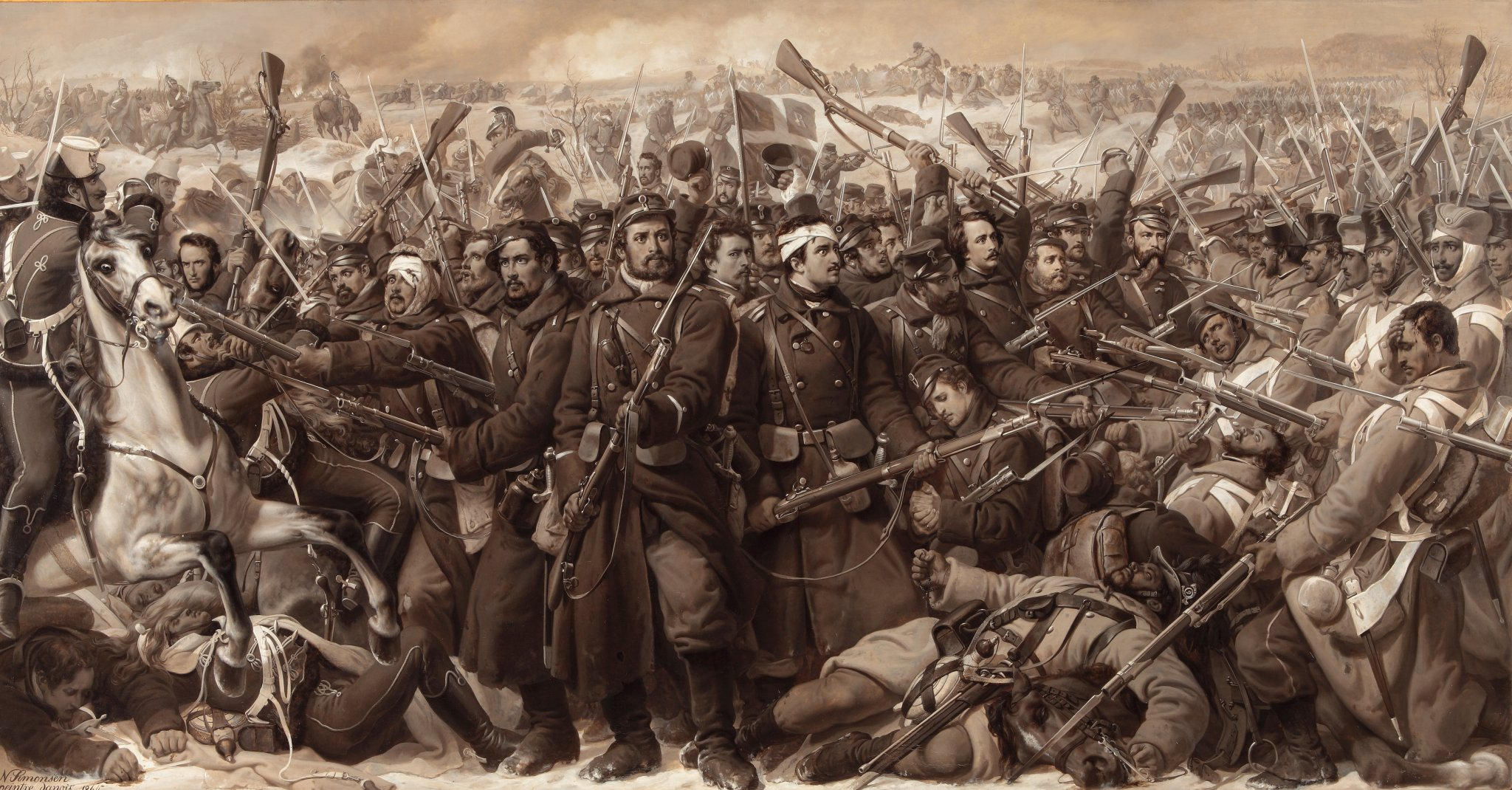
Illustration of the battle by Niels Simonsen

The Danish 7th Brigade consisting of the 1st Regiment, made up of soldiers from Copenhagen and the 11th Regiment, made up of soldiers from Vendsyssel was commanded by Colonel Max Müller and had taken up positions on both sides of the road. Around 3:30pm, the battle commenced when Colonel Max Müller ordered the 1st Regiment to attack. The Danish troops launched a fierce bayonet charge and despite the numerical advantage of the Austrian troops, the Danish troops managed to halt the Austrians. Fierce fighting, including hand-to-hand combat, followed and lasted for hours without either side gaining the decisive upper hand, until an Austrian bayonet charge finally forced the Danes to retreat. The battle ended around 5:00pm, when the sun began to set. The 7th Brigade then withdrew and linked up with the rest of the Danish army. However, they came under Austrian artillery fire and suffered considerable losses.

According to the Danes, 210 Danes and 406 Austrians were killed or wounded during the battle. According to the Austrians, however, the Danes lost 962 men and the Austrians only 431.

== Aftermath ==
With this successful rearguard action by the 7th Brigade, the Danish army reached the safety of the redoubts at Dybbøl. Despite heavy losses, the Danish soldiers had performed well and the Austrian pursuers were halted. The successful withdrawal of the Danish army was, however, met with anger and disbelief from the Danish public and politicians. Following the victory in the First Schleswig War, a sense of military superiority had spread in Denmark and the Danevirke, considered the historical border between Denmark and the German states, was considered a sacred national symbol and a formidable defensive line.

In reality the fortifications of the Danevirke were not sufficient for a successful defense. Only the army recognised this, while politicians and the public demanded a defense of this national symbol. Few considered and acknowledged that De Meza had actually saved the army from eventual certain destruction by withdrawing and that the army had successfully withdrawn without significant casualties.

De Meza was eventually sacked by the Minister of War and the Danish army lost one of its most capable and resourceful officers at a critical stage of the war. The perceived loss of face also meant that a later withdrawal from the defences at Dybbøl was almost impossible due to public and political pressure. This became a factor in the later Danish defeat at the Battle of Dybbøl.

== Literature ==
- J. Ganschow, O. Haselhorst, M. Ohnezeit: Der Deutsch-Dänische Krieg 1864. Vorgeschichte - Verlauf - Folgen. Graz 2013.
- J. Christensen (u. a.): 1864. Fra helstat til nationalstat. Fårevejle 1998.
- M. Embree: Bismarck’s first war. The campaign of Schleswig and Jutland 1864. Solihull 2007.
