= Ausacker =

- Municipality
- Coat of arms

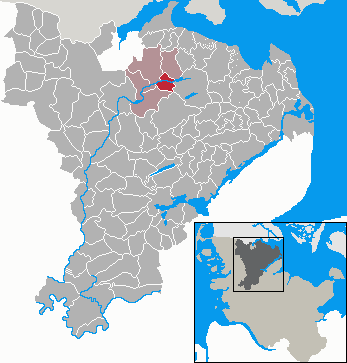
- Location of Ausacker within Schleswig-Flensburg district
- Interactive map of Ausacker
- Location within Germany Location within Schleswig-Holstein
- Coordinates: 54°43′N 9°34′E
- Country: Germany
- State: Schleswig-Holstein
- District: Schleswig-Flensburg
- Municipal assoc.: Hürup

Government
  - Mayor: Anke Dogs

Area
  - Total: 9.13 km^{2} (3.53 sq mi)
- Elevation: 41 m (135 ft)

Population (2025-12-31)
  - Total: 494
  - Density: 54.1/km^{2} (140/sq mi)
- Time zone: UTC+01:00 (CET)
  - Summer (DST): UTC+02:00 (CEST)
- Postal codes: 24975
- Dialling codes: 04633 u. 04634
- Vehicle registration: SL
- Website: www.amthuerup.de

Ausacker (Danish: Oksager) is a municipality in the district of Schleswig-Flensburg, in Schleswig-Holstein, Germany.
