= Großsolt =

Großsolt Store Solt
- Municipality
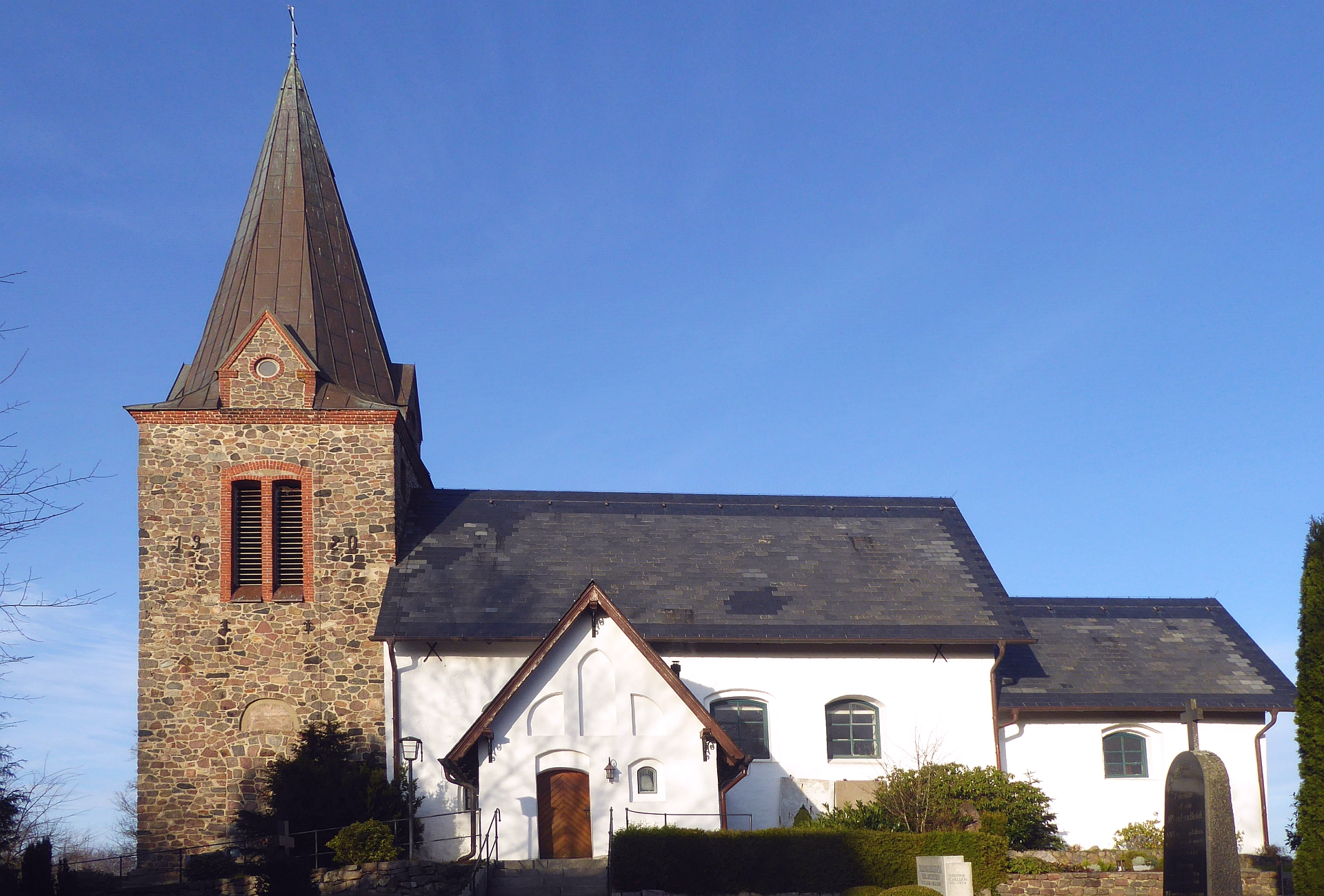
- Großsolt Church

- Coat of arms

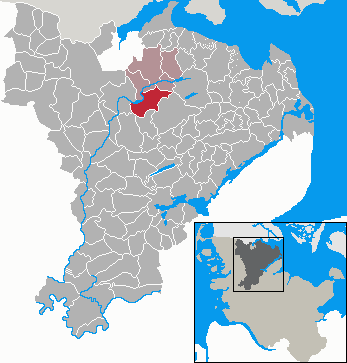
- Location of Großsolt; Store Solt within Schleswig-Flensburg district
- Interactive map of Großsolt; Store Solt
- Location within Germany Location within Schleswig-Holstein
- Coordinates: 54°42′N 9°31′E
- Country: Germany
- State: Schleswig-Holstein
- District: Schleswig-Flensburg
- Municipal assoc.: Hürup

Government
  - Mayor: Peter Richelsen

Area
  - Total: 25.07 km^{2} (9.68 sq mi)
- Elevation: 29 m (95 ft)

Population (2025-12-31)
  - Total: 1,768
  - Density: 70.52/km^{2} (182.7/sq mi)
- Time zone: UTC+01:00 (CET)
  - Summer (DST): UTC+02:00 (CEST)
- Postal codes: 24991
- Dialling codes: 04602, 04633
- Vehicle registration: SL
- Website: www.amthuerup.de

Großsolt (Danish: Store Solt) is a municipality in the district of Schleswig-Flensburg, in Schleswig-Holstein, Germany.

== Geography ==
The municipality of Großsolt is located about ten kilometers south of Flensburg and consists of the villages Großsoltholz ( Store Soltskov ), Großsoltwesterholz, Großsoltbrück ( Store Soltbro ), Bistoft, Estrup, Kollerup, Mühlenbrück ( Møllebro ) and Großsolt itself.

The Bondenau and the Kielstau, from which further west the Treene emerges, flow through the municipality from east to west and end in the Treßsee .

The landscape is hilly and consists mainly of Weichselian ground moraines and inland sand . Großsolt is one of the landscape fishing .

== History ==
Großsolt was first mentioned in 1352. The name originated from the original name of today's eastern Treßseeniederung (Treene river lowlands). The shore of the lake was located near the village until the early modern period. The ending "-solt" comes from "sulz" for marsh, marshy terrain. A derivation from the word of "salt", as it occurs in some Schleswigian names has been conjectured to point to an earlier name of the Bondenau river, but other sources deem it improbable.

Until the 20th century, people were fishing in Großsolt. The Treßsee, which was probably more than one hundred hectares in size, silted up due to river regulation on the Kielstau and the Bondenau rivers in 1925 and further land consolidation in the 1960s and 1970s. As salmon populations died off, the fishing rights that had once guaranteed local prosperity became meaningless.

At the end of the Second World War, in May 1945, Heinrich Himmler temporarily stayed with his entourage in Kollerup ( ♁ Lage ). Himmler had come to the Flensburg area via the so-called Rattenlinie Nord to take part in the last Reich government in Flensburg-Mürwik . After being denied a place in the new government, he fled further south to Bremervörde, where he was captured by British soldiers and shortly afterwards died by suicide on May 23, 1945 in Lüneburg.
