= Tybjerg Church =

Tybjerg Church Tybjerg Kirke
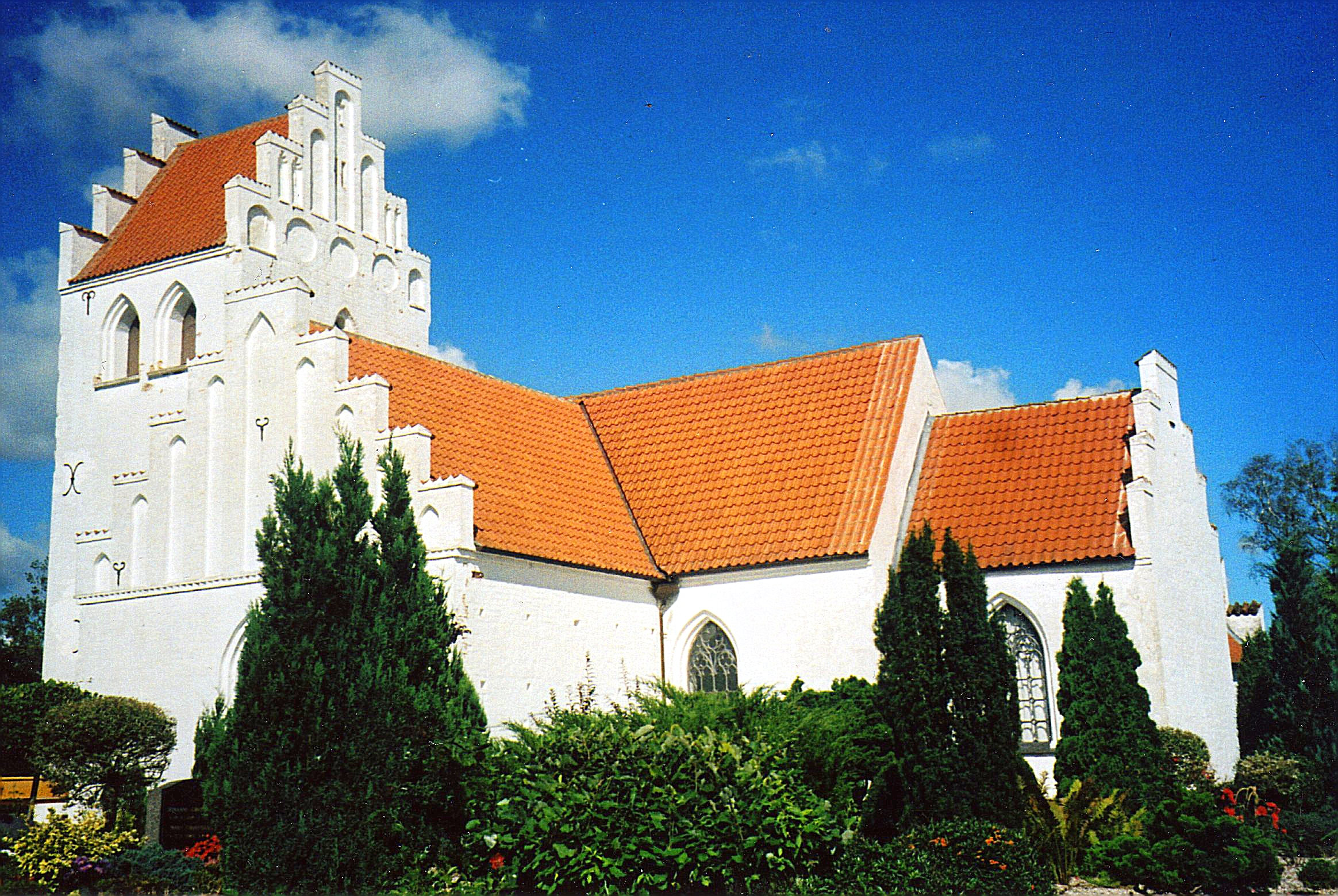
- Tybjerg Church
- Tybjerg Church; Tybjerg Kirke
- 55°20′54″N 11°48′44″E
- Location: Tybjerg
- Country: Denmark
- Denomination: Church of Denmark
- Previous denomination: Catholic

History
- Founded: c. 1175

Architecture
- Functional status: Functional
- Style: Late Gothic

Administration
- Division: Næstved Municipality
- District: Region Zealand

Tybjerg Church (Danish: Tybjerg Kirke) is a Church of Denmark parish church situated on a small hill in the village of Tybjerg, just east of Tybjerggaard, Næstved Municipality, Denmark.

== History ==
The church was constructed around 1175. It is the namesake of the local herred, whose seal features an image of Our Lady, indicating that the church was most likely dedicated to her. The church belonged to the bishops of Roskilde but was administrated from Skovkloster Abbey in Næstved, a situation which caused local dissatisfaction.

The church was confiscated by the Crown in connection with the Reformation. On 31 December 1678, the Tybjerg and Aversi churches were transferred to Tybjerggaard, which was given to Adam Levin Knuth. The church was annexed to the nearby Herlufmagle Church in 1681. The church gained its independence on 1 April 1917.

== Architecture ==
The Romanesque nave and chancel are constructed of limestone from Faxe. The original windows in the north and east side of the chancel have been bricked up but can still be seen. A western brick extension of the nave was added around 1400.

A tower, sacristy, porch and south chapel were constructed in brick in the Late Gothic period (c. 1500). The blindings on the gable are of a type characteristic for churches on the southern part of Zealand. All the current windows date from a renovation in 1862–1863.

== Church frescos ==
The church frescos in the chancel date from c. 1175. The church frescos in the nave were created by the so-called Højelse Workshop in 1435.

== Furnishings ==
The auricular altarpiece was created by Abel Schröder the Younger in 658. The pulpit is from the 19th century but incorporates Renaissance-style elements from the 16th century. The triumphal arch is decorated with the coat of arms of the Basse family, featuring wild boars and squirrels. The coat of arms of Otto von Voss, who served as bailiff on Tybjerggaard until 1434, is seen on the southern part of the skjoldbue.

== Churchyard ==
- Otto Irminger Kaarsberg (1892–1970), Supreme Court justice
- Gustav Rønholt (1924–2014), politician
- Klaus Rønholt (1823–1944), World War II resistance fighter
- Peter Rønholt
- Peter Frederik Steinmann (1812–1804), military officer, politician and landowner

== Gallery ==
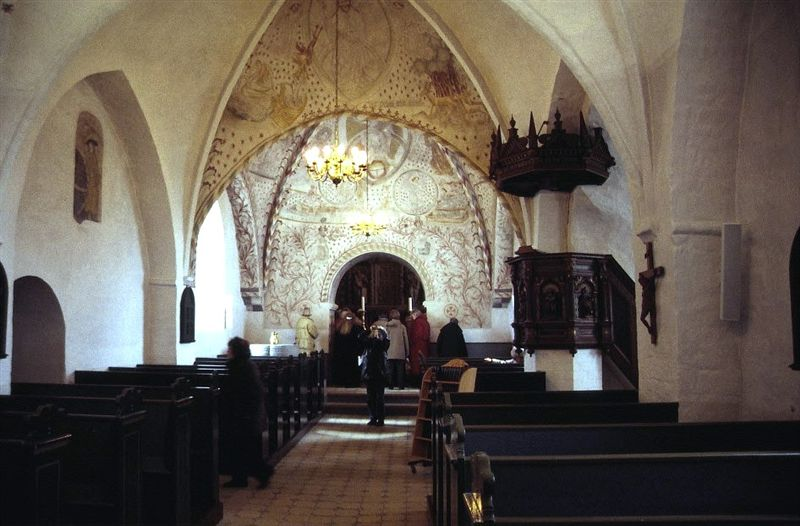
Interior

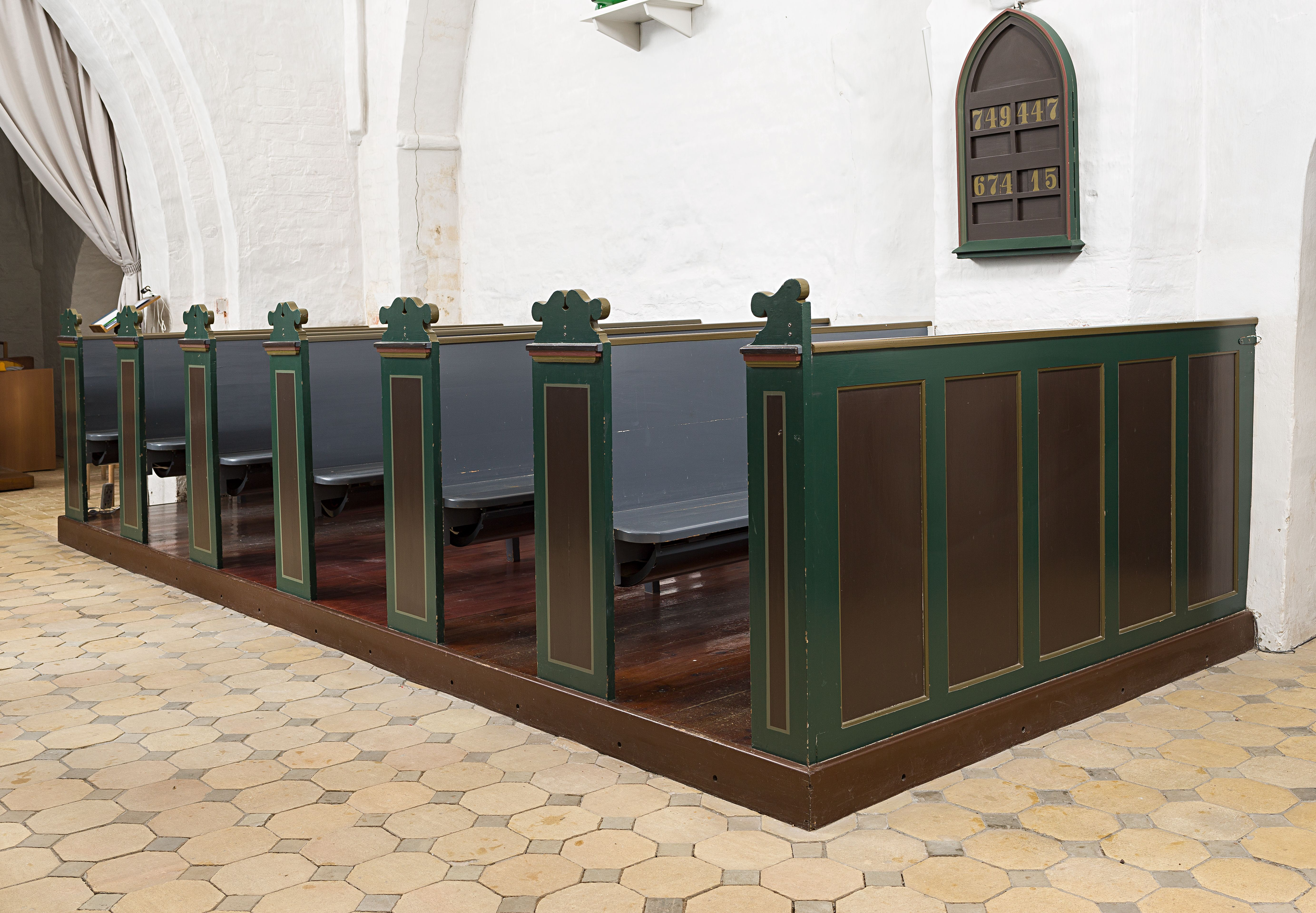
Pews
