= Oeversee (Amt) =

Government office in Schleswig-Holstein

- Amt
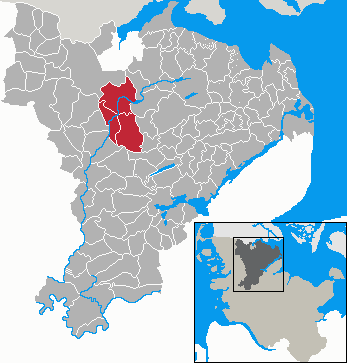
- Map of Schleswig-Flensburg highlighting Oeversee
- Interactive map of Oeversee
- Location within Germany Location within Schleswig-Holstein
- Coordinates: 54°40′N 9°24′E
- Country: Germany
- State: Schleswig-Holstein
- District: Schleswig-Flensburg
- Seat: Tarp
- Subdivisions: 3 municipalities

Area
  - Total: 83.64 km^{2} (32.29 sq mi)

Population (2025-12-31)
  - Total: 11,120
  - Density: 133.0/km^{2} (344.3/sq mi)
- Time zone: UTC+01:00 (CET)
  - Summer (DST): UTC+02:00 (CEST)
- Vehicle registration: SL
- Website: www.amtoeversee.de

Oeversee is an Amt ("collective municipality") in the district of Schleswig-Flensburg, in Schleswig-Holstein, Germany. The seat of the Amt is in Tarp.

== Municipalities ==
The Amt Oeversee consists of the following municipalities:

1. Oeversee
2. Sieverstedt
3. Tarp
