= Tarp, Germany =

Tarp
- Municipality
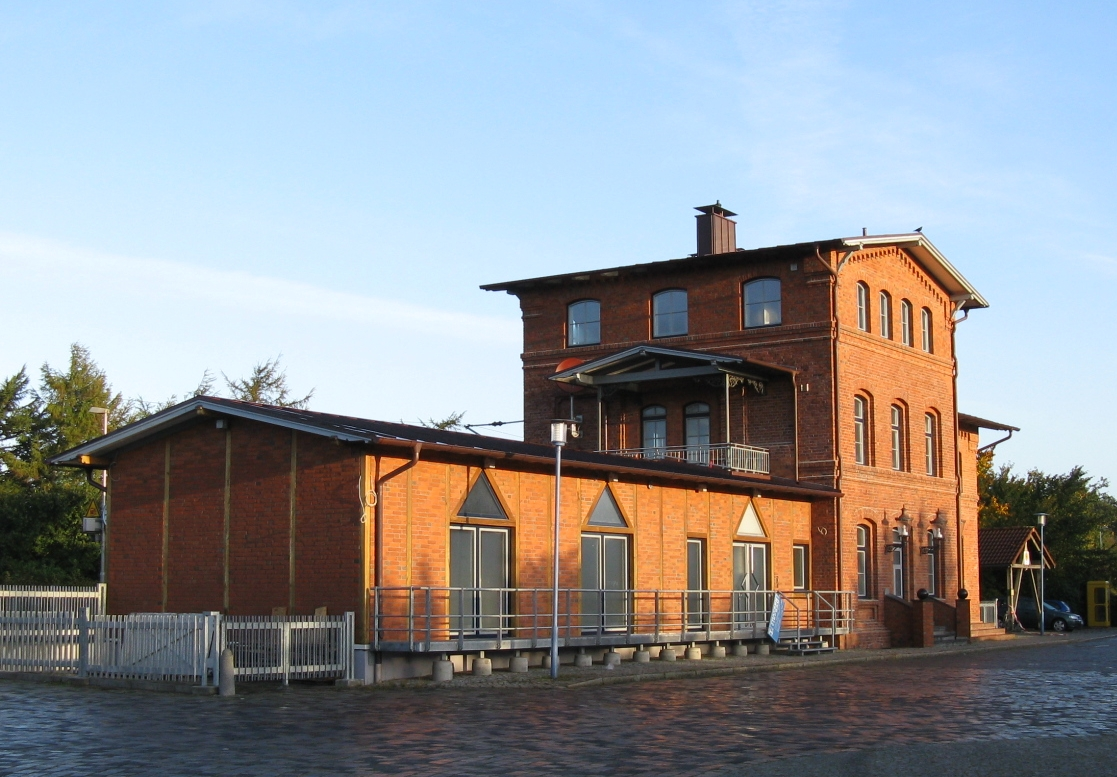
- Train station

- Coat of arms

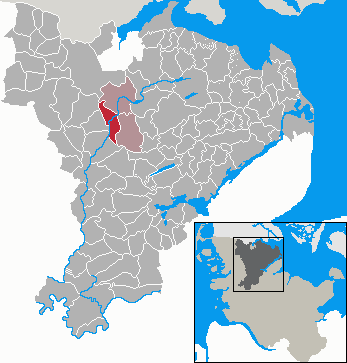
- Location of Tarp within Schleswig-Flensburg district
- Interactive map of Tarp
- Location within Germany Location within Schleswig-Holstein
- Coordinates: 54°40′N 9°24′E
- Country: Germany
- State: Schleswig-Holstein
- District: Schleswig-Flensburg
- Municipal assoc.: Oeversee

Government
  - Mayor: Brunhilde Eberle (CDU)

Area
  - Total: 16.36 km^{2} (6.32 sq mi)
- Elevation: 24 m (79 ft)

Population (2025-12-31)
  - Total: 5,910
  - Density: 361/km^{2} (936/sq mi)
- Time zone: UTC+01:00 (CET)
  - Summer (DST): UTC+02:00 (CEST)
- Postal codes: 24963
- Dialling codes: 04638
- Vehicle registration: SL
- Website: www.tarp.de

Tarp (also Danish: Tarup) is a municipality in the district of Schleswig-Flensburg, in Schleswig-Holstein, Germany within the county Kreis Schleswig-Flensburg.

It is situated about 18 km south of Flensburg.

== Geography ==
Tarp is located on the river Trenen west of Lusangel on the sandy gest . North-west of the village by Trenen and near Troldskær and Frørup Skov (Frørup Bjerge) lies Tarp Forest. The municipality also includes (in addition to Tarp) Kildevang (Kielswang ), Tornskov (Tornschau) and Kjeldbæk (in Danish also Kilbæk, German Keelbek ), which were incorporated into the municipality in 1970. Kjeldbæk is located by the stream of the same name, which originates in Ebbesdam ug flows west of the city into the Trenen.

== History ==
Tarp is first mentioned in 1448. The place name is derived from the Frisian male name Tati or Tade, which in the 15th century is known exclusively from southern Schleswig, but in older sources also appears in Northern Jutland, on the islands, in Scania and Sweden. Tornskov is first mentioned in 1448, derived from the tree name tjørn . Kjeldbæk is documented for the first time in 1399/1407 (Dipl. Flensb.). The future is happy. kelda for spring or well. The suffix denotes a small stream.

The area Bredde med Breddesig in the north is first mentioned in 1781, designated agerjod north of the village. The area Horshave (Hashau) in the east is first mentioned in 1694. The prefix is hors (horse), the suffix is have, denotes meadows by Trenen. The name Kølbjerg (Köhlbarg) is presumably taken from glda. club for club. Skelkær (Schellkier) in the south is first mentioned in 1695. The prefix is subs. skel (border), thus denotes meadows at a border crossing. The new 41-hectare detached house quarter Schellenpark on Langager in the south-west has its (new) name, on the other hand, from the plant name ty. Kuhschelle for cow bells (corresponding to (cow) bell park ), which is found here at Trenen. The area Vikær (Wiekier) was first documented in 1780. The prefix is the plant name vie (white-arrow ). The meadow at the junction with Frørup is called Harkile. The school language in Tarup was Danish until 1864.

Tarp's attraction is the Dutch mill Antje from 1882. In the town, there is also a collection of 72 walking blocks (Findlingsgarten) with explanations about the stone's origin and material, as well as an owl path (Eulenpfad) with 64 owls as wooden sculptures in and around Tarp.

Tarp's municipal coat of arms shows an owl over a wave in the Schleswig/Sonderjutland colors blue and yellow. The owl refers to Ugle Herred, the wave to Trenen.

== Education ==
- Mini-Lernkreis Nord Stefan Ringwald
- Waldkindergarten Tarp e.
- ADS-KINDERGARTEN TARP. Friedrich-Fröbel-Straße
- Alexander Behm school, primary and community school Tarp
