= Husby, Germany =

Husby
- Municipality
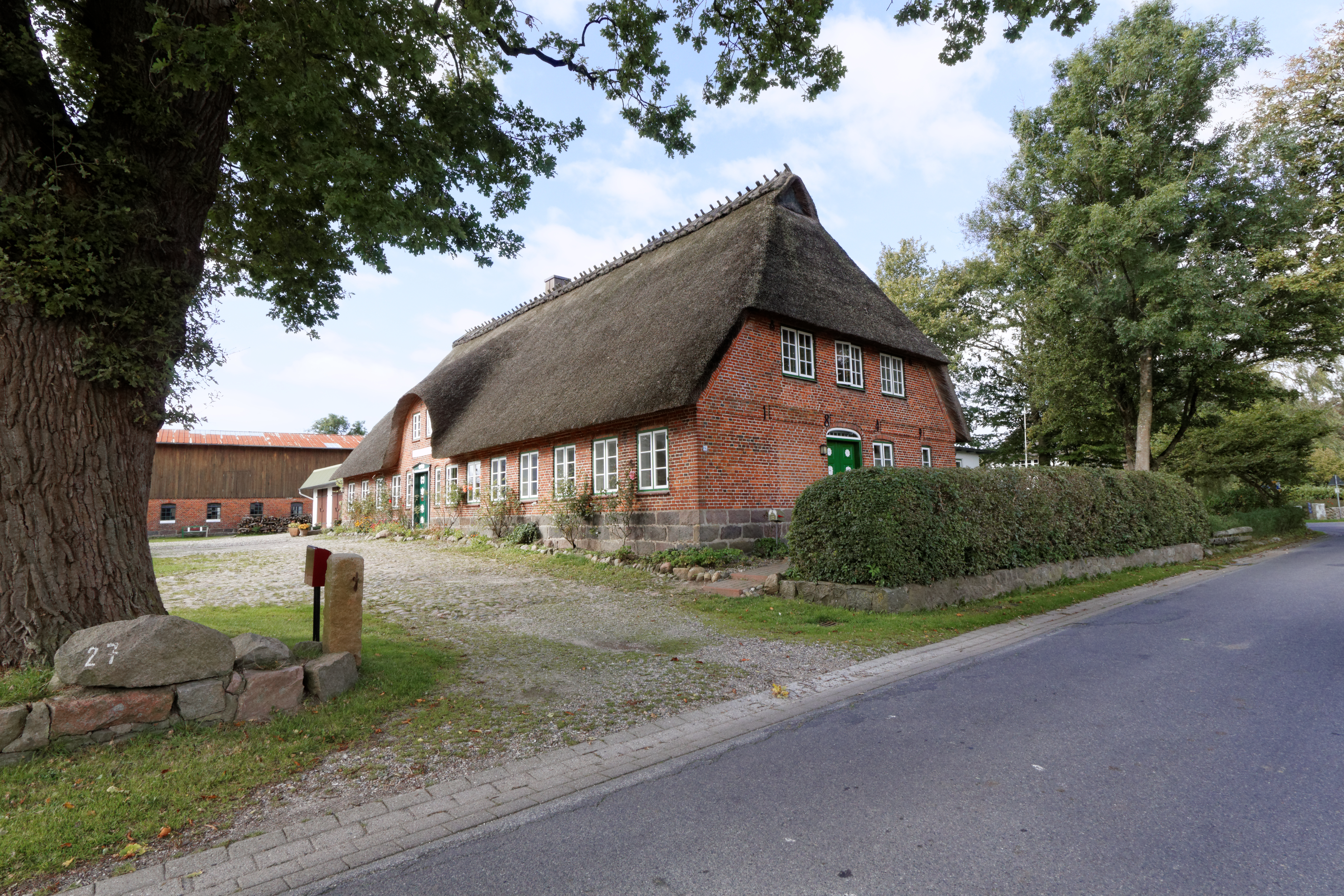

- Coat of arms

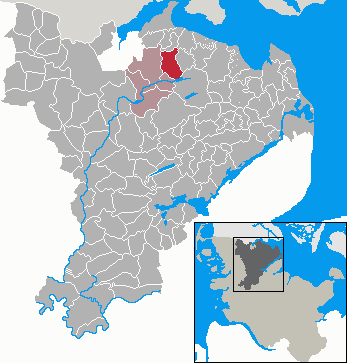
- Location of Husby within Schleswig-Flensburg district
- Interactive map of Husby
- Location within Germany Location within Schleswig-Holstein
- Coordinates: 54°46′N 9°34′E
- Country: Germany
- State: Schleswig-Holstein
- District: Schleswig-Flensburg
- Municipal assoc.: Hürup

Government
  - Mayor: Günter Schmidt

Area
  - Total: 19.31 km^{2} (7.46 sq mi)
- Elevation: 49 m (161 ft)

Population (2025-12-31)
  - Total: 2,356
  - Density: 122.0/km^{2} (316.0/sq mi)
- Time zone: UTC+01:00 (CET)
  - Summer (DST): UTC+02:00 (CEST)
- Postal codes: 24975
- Dialling codes: 04634
- Vehicle registration: SL
- Website: www.amthuerup.de

Husby is a municipality in the district of Schleswig-Flensburg, in Schleswig-Holstein, Germany.
