= Adam Levin Knuth =

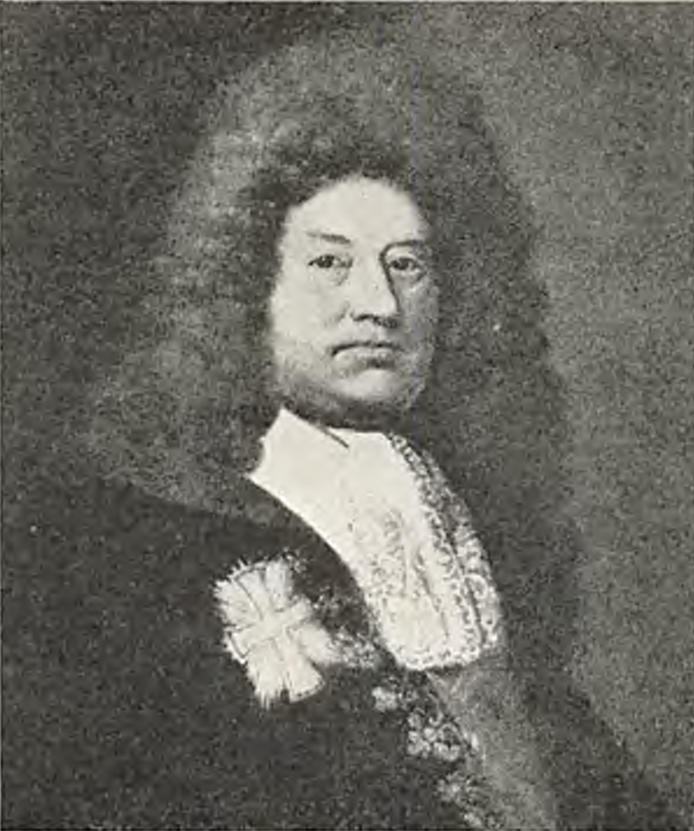
Adam Levin Knuth.

Adam Levin Knuth (1648–1699) was a Danish landowner, county governor and extraordinary Supreme Court justice. He was one of Christian V's favourites. His holdings included Farumgård, Tybjerggaard and Gisselfeld. He was the paternal uncle of Adam Christopher Knuth, Count of Knuthenborg.

== Early life and education ==
Knuth was born on 1 March 1648 at Leizen, Mecklenburg, the son of Ernst Knuth zu Leizen and Elisabeth Mohrin. His father was rittmeister and provisor for Malchow Abbey. In 1661, Knuth was sent to Copenhagen to live with Lord Master of the Royal Hunt (overjægermester) Vincents Hahn.

Knuth's elder brother Eggert Christopher Knuth was later also sent to Denmark where he became one of the largest landowners on Lolland. His widow Søster Lerhce was able to establish the countship of Knuthenborg for their son Adam Christopher Knuth.

== Career ==
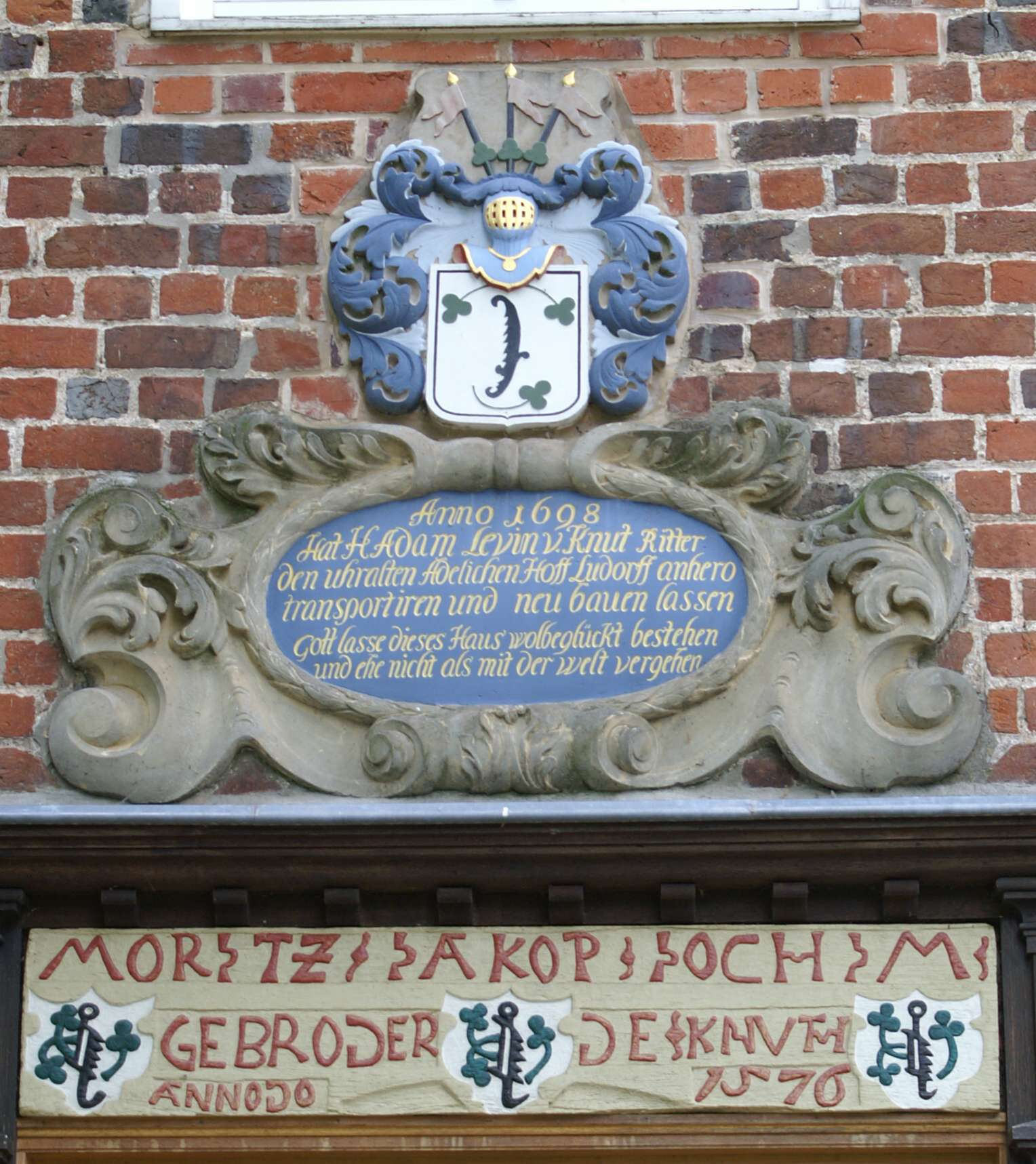
The family coat of arms of Adam Levin von Knuth from 1698.

On New Year's Day 1664, Knuth became court page to the young Crown Prince Christian (V). After Christian's ascent to the throne, he was appointed to kammerjunker. By royal resolution of 17 December 1781, he was promoted to overkammerjunker). In their youth, Knuth and the crown prince were described as inseparable and he was later explicitly referred to as the king's favourite. He was also put in charge of managing the budget of the royal household together with treasurer Peter Brandt as well as managing the personal finances of the king and the provenue from the Sound Dues.

On 1 October 1682, he was appointed county governor of Copenhagen County. He held this post until his death. On 2 February 1692, he was also appointed patron of the Knight's Academy in Copenhagen. In 1696, he was appointed an extraordinary Supreme Court justice.

On 4 May 1684, he was created a Knight of the Order of the Dannebrog with the motto "Ehrlich wahrt lange". On 3 December 1693, he was appointed Geheimeraad.

== Property ==
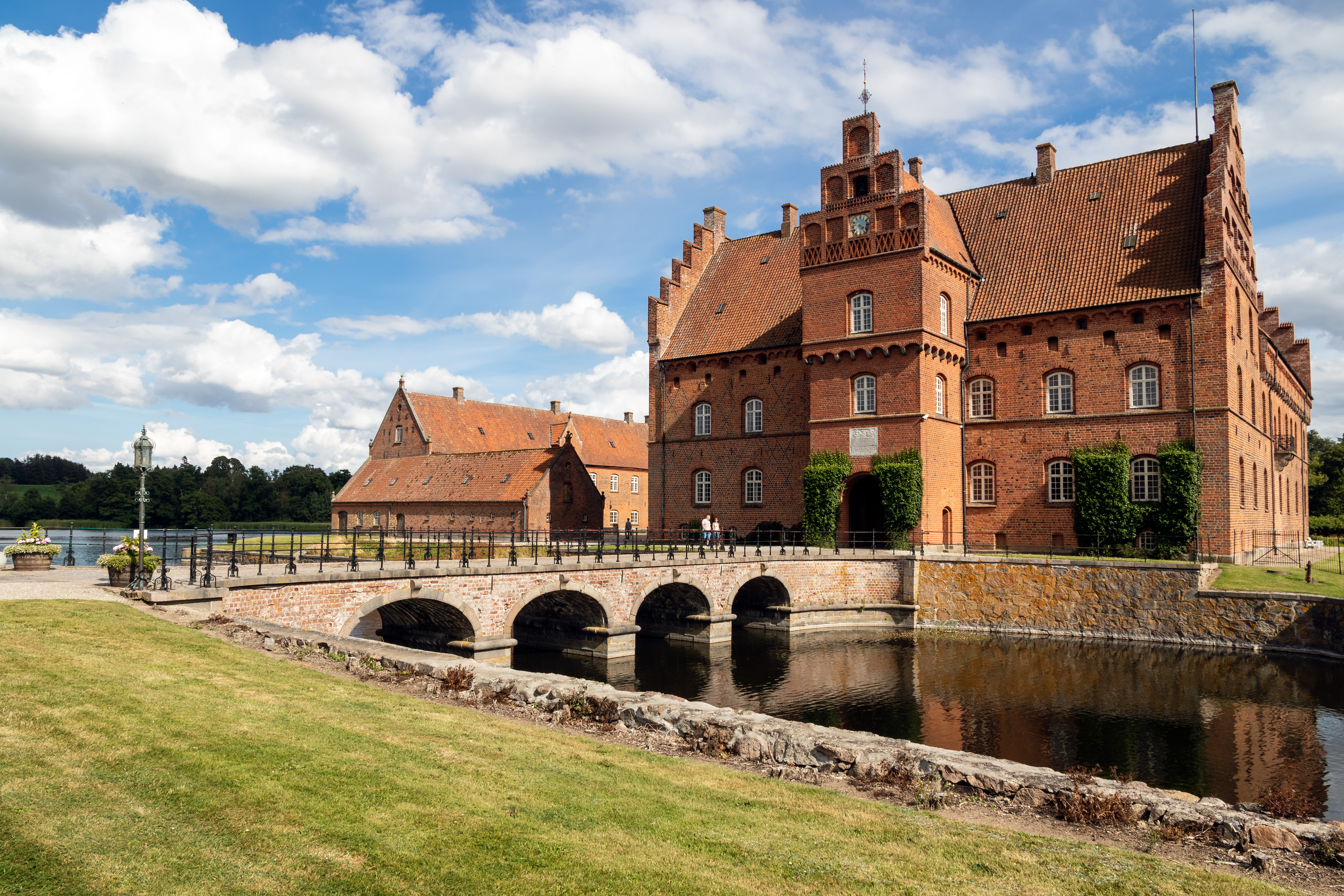
Gisselfeld.

In 1675, Knuth purchased Farumgård north of Copenhagen. He kept this property until 1693.

In 1678, Christian V granted Tybjerggaard to Knuth. At the same event, Rubjerg and Aversi churches were transferred to Tybjerggaard. In 1681, he bought Assendrup.

In 1689, Knuth sold the estate back to the crown. In the previous year, Knuth had bought Gisselfeld. Braaby Church belonged to the estate.

== Personal life and legacy ==
Knuth remained unmarried. He died unexpectedly at Copenhagen Castle on 13 January 1699 and is buried in Braaby Church.

Knuth's heirs sold Gisselfeld (with Assendrup) to Christian Gyldenløve, Christian V's illegitimate son by Sophie Amalie Moth.

Some of Knuth's letters to Christian Lente, C. B. Ehrenschild and J. G. Holstein have survived.
