= Braaby Church =

Coordinates: 55°17′51″N 11°56′41″E

- Bråby Kirke
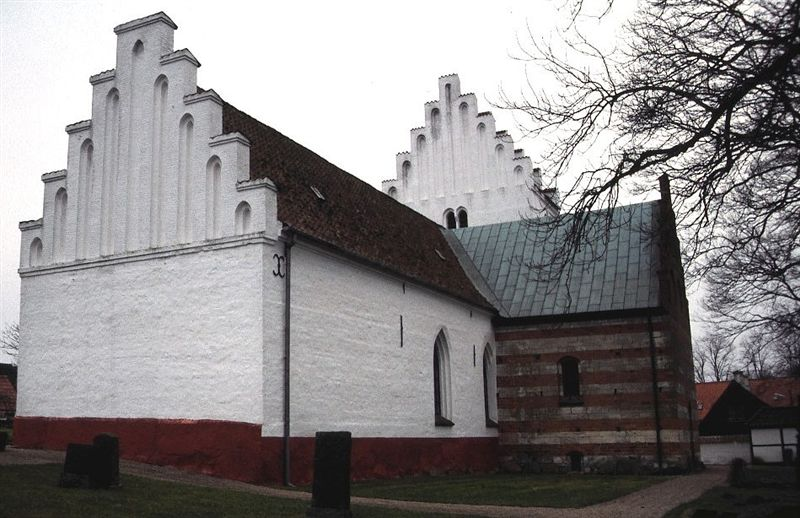
- Braaby Church
- Location: Bråby, Faxe Municipality, Denmark
- Denomination: Church of Denmark

Architecture
- Architectural type: Romanesque style
- Years built: c. 1100

Administration
- Diocese: Diocese of Roskilde
- Parish: Bråby Sogn

Braaby Church (Danish: Bråby Kirke) is a Romanesque Danish church located in the Diocese of Roskilde, Faxe Municipality in Region Sjælland on the island of Zealand. There have been substantial Gothic additions to the original 12th-century building.

== History and architecture ==
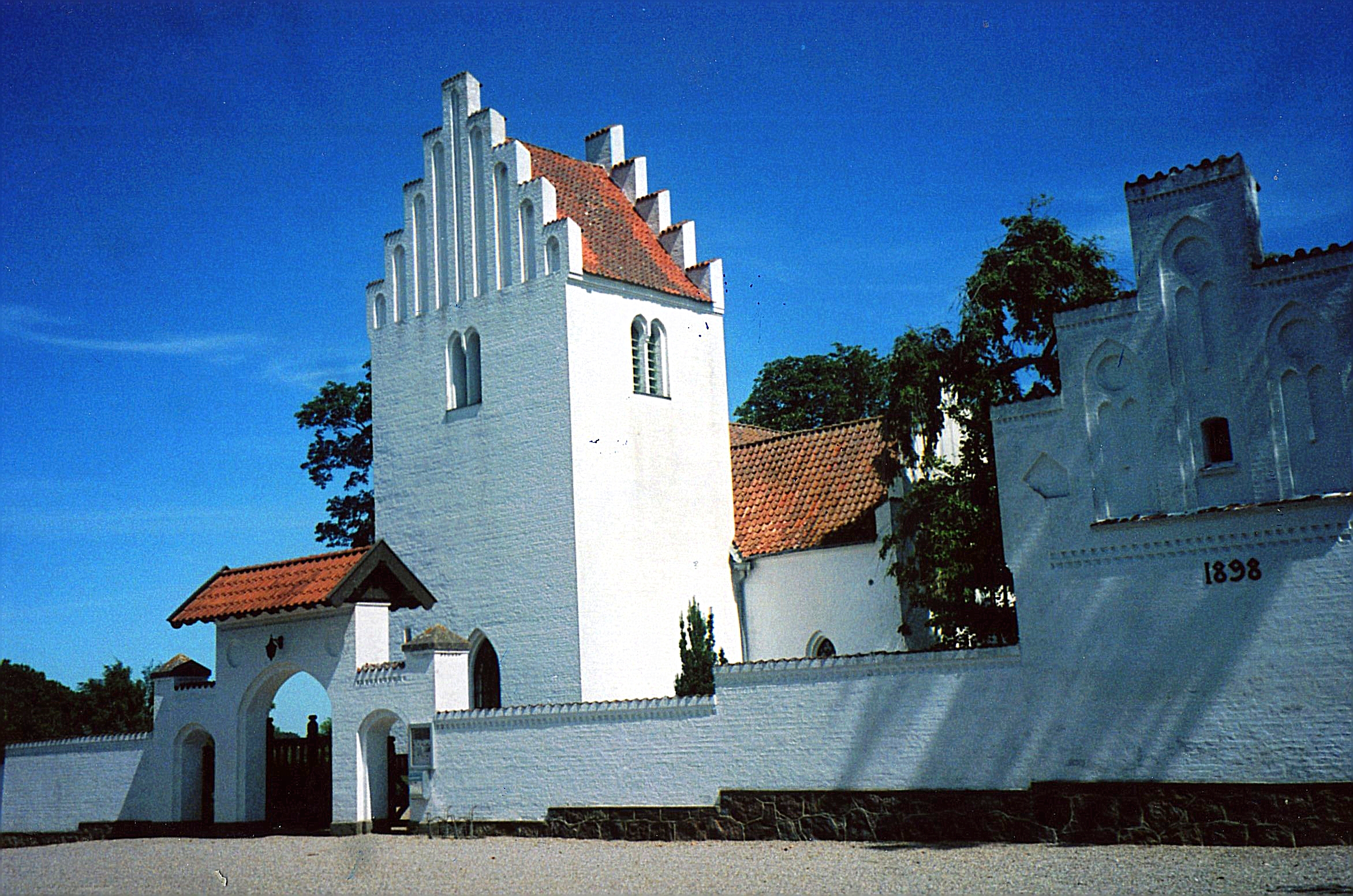
Braaby Church

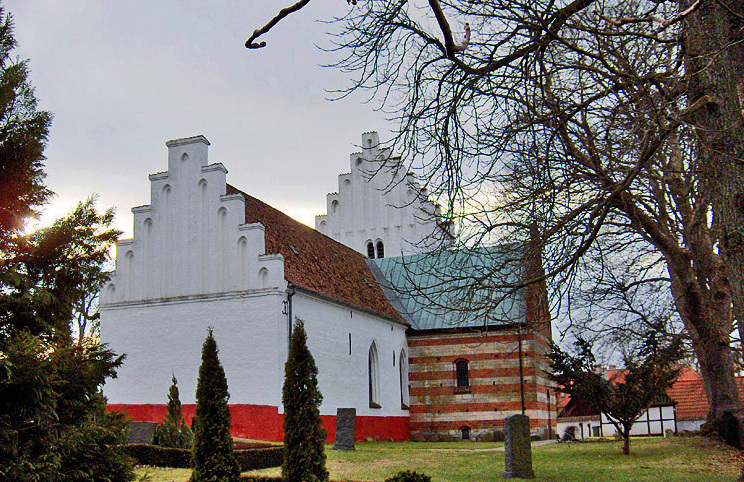
Braaby Church, Brårup (Faxe)

The precise date of the church's construction is not known but it was first documented around 1370 when it consisted of the current Romanesque nave and a smaller chancel, both built of limestone blocks. In about 1500, the tower, porch and north chapel were added with decorations consisting of belts of brick and limestone. Today's chancel was constructed in c. 1570. After Steward of the Realm Peder Oxe had built nearby Gisselfeld Manor in 1556, he received Braaby Church as a gift from King Christian III. The church remained in the ownership of Gisselfeld until 1967.

== Interior ==
In 1880, a vault was constructed in place of the wooden ceiling. The tomb headpiece in the nave adjacent to the north chapel is from 1695. It is decorated with a skull flanked by volutes. The cornice bears 14 ancestral arms with an inscription stating: "The nobleman Adam Levith Knuth of Gisselfeld and Assendrup who was born 1 March 1648 in Meklenburg and died 13 January 1699 has completed this tomb and memorial for his soul's eternal rest and his corporal remains." It is headed by a large carving bearing the family arms surrounded by symbols of war.

Below the memorial windows, there is a carved depiction of a young woman with wavy hair sitting in a wooded landscape. She is caressing a dog with her left hand while she hushes with the fingers of her right hand. The inscription from Proverbs 11, verse 12, reads "But a man of understanding remains silent." Below the memorial, there is a crypt with the coffins of Knuth, Sophia Ulfeldt of Orebygård (died 1698) and her daughter Countess Hilleborg Holck (died 1724) who was Knuth's longstanding fiancée. A batch of letters was found in her coffin which might explain why they never married but out of respect for the deceased they have not been read.

The rood screen (1695) bears Knuth's arms with a black kettle hook. The painting on the altarpiece is by Constantin Hansen (1833). The pulpit is from 1862. On the north wall of the chancel there is an epitaph to Peder Oxe who died in 1575. It was completed before his death and although he was buried in Church of Our Lady in Copenhagen, the date of his death has been added. The epitaph states that Braaby Church has been moved to Gisselfeld. This never happened but he was so convinced that his plans would be carried out and the church would be moved stone by stone that he included it in his epitaph.

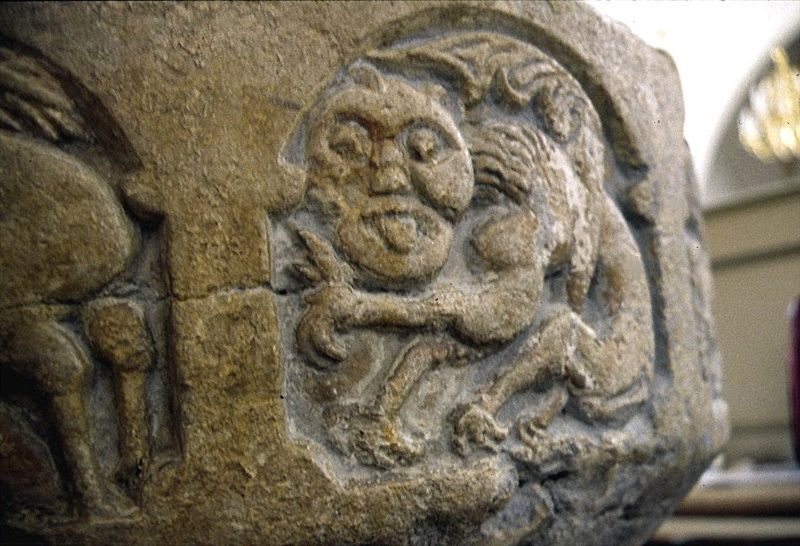
Baptismal font (detail).

Gotland limestone has been used to make the font from the later part of the 12th century. It is akin to the font seen in Bornholm, though the decorations are different; these are inferred to be by an artist of Zealand. The bowl of the font has decorations made in relief. They depict the Three Kings and Saint Anne holding the baby Jesus. Also seen in the relief are other scenes of an angel restraining a hunter, a deer, a cross turned towards the hunter, satan in the form of an ape, and horses saddled but without the riders, the central horse carrying a falcon. The plinth also has relief decorations of a bishop, two snakes being nursed by a woman, a snake, and also of a book with a cross and griffin.

== Burials ==
- Adam Levin Knuth (1648-1699), statesman and landowner (inside the church)
- Carl Adolph Kraft (1876-1964), military officer and sportsman
- Frederik Christian Kaas (1727-1804), naval officer and landowner
- Frants Lassen (1922-1997), captain, chamberlain and Resistance Fighter
- Otto Frederik Christian Rasmussen (1814-1888), writer, historian and estate manager
