= Hürup =

Hürup Hyrup
- Municipality
- Coat of arms

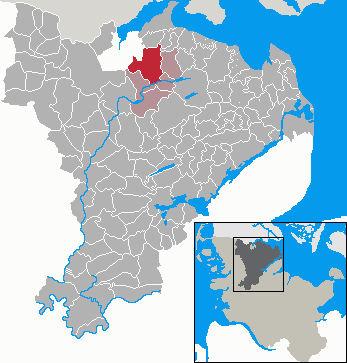
- Location of Hürup; Hyrup within Schleswig-Flensburg district
- Interactive map of Hürup; Hyrup
- Location within Germany Location within Schleswig-Holstein
- Coordinates: 54°45′N 9°31′E
- Country: Germany
- State: Schleswig-Holstein
- District: Schleswig-Flensburg
- Municipal assoc.: Hürup

Government
  - Mayor: Jan-Nils Klindt

Area
  - Total: 28.07 km^{2} (10.84 sq mi)
- Elevation: 43 m (141 ft)

Population (2025-12-31)
  - Total: 2,424
  - Density: 86.36/km^{2} (223.7/sq mi)
- Time zone: UTC+01:00 (CET)
  - Summer (DST): UTC+02:00 (CEST)
- Postal codes: 24975
- Dialling codes: 04634
- Vehicle registration: SL
- Website: www.amthuerup.de

Hürup (German pronunciation: [ˈhyːʁʊp]; Danish: Hyrup) is a municipality in the district of Schleswig-Flensburg, in Schleswig-Holstein, Germany. It is situated approximately 7 km southeast of Flensburg.

Hürup is the seat of the Amt of Hürup. In March 2023 Hürup absorbed the former municipalities Maasbüll and Tastrup.
