= Sieverstedt =

Sieverstedt Siversted
- Municipality
- Coat of arms

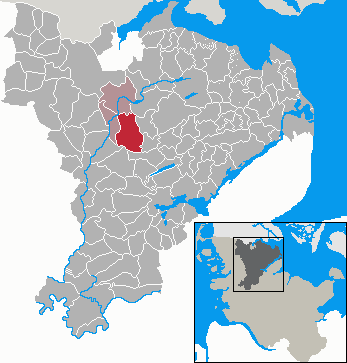
- Location of Sieverstedt; Siversted within Schleswig-Flensburg district
- Interactive map of Sieverstedt; Siversted
- Location within Germany Location within Schleswig-Holstein
- Coordinates: 54°38′N 9°28′E
- Country: Germany
- State: Schleswig-Holstein
- District: Schleswig-Flensburg
- Municipal assoc.: Oeversee

Government
  - Mayor: Hartwig Wilkens

Area
  - Total: 31.01 km^{2} (11.97 sq mi)
- Elevation: 33 m (108 ft)

Population (2025-12-31)
  - Total: 1,642
  - Density: 52.95/km^{2} (137.1/sq mi)
- Time zone: UTC+01:00 (CET)
  - Summer (DST): UTC+02:00 (CEST)
- Postal codes: 24885
- Dialling codes: 04638 bzw. 04603
- Vehicle registration: SL
- Website: www.amtoeversee.de

Sieverstedt (Danish: Siversted) is a municipality in the district of Schleswig-Flensburg, in Schleswig-Holstein, Germany.
