= Maasbüll =

Maasbüll Masbøl
- Ortsteil of Hürup
- Coat of arms
- Interactive map of Maasbüll
- Location within Germany Location within Schleswig-Holstein
- Coordinates: 54°46′37″N 9°31′26″E
- Country: Germany
- State: Schleswig-Holstein
- District: Schleswig-Flensburg
- Municipality: Hürup

Area
  - Total: 7.71 km^{2} (2.98 sq mi)
- Elevation: 58 m (190 ft)

Population (2021-12-31)
  - Total: 714
  - Density: 92.6/km^{2} (240/sq mi)
- Time zone: UTC+01:00 (CET)
  - Summer (DST): UTC+02:00 (CEST)
- Postal codes: 24975
- Dialling codes: 04634
- Website: www.amthuerup.de

Maasbüll (German pronunciation: [ˈmaːsbʏl]; Danish: Masbøl) is a village and a former municipality in the district of Schleswig-Flensburg, in Schleswig-Holstein, Germany. On 1 March 2023 it became part of the municipality Hürup.
