= Peter Frederik Steinmann =

Danish Officer and War Minister (1812–1894)

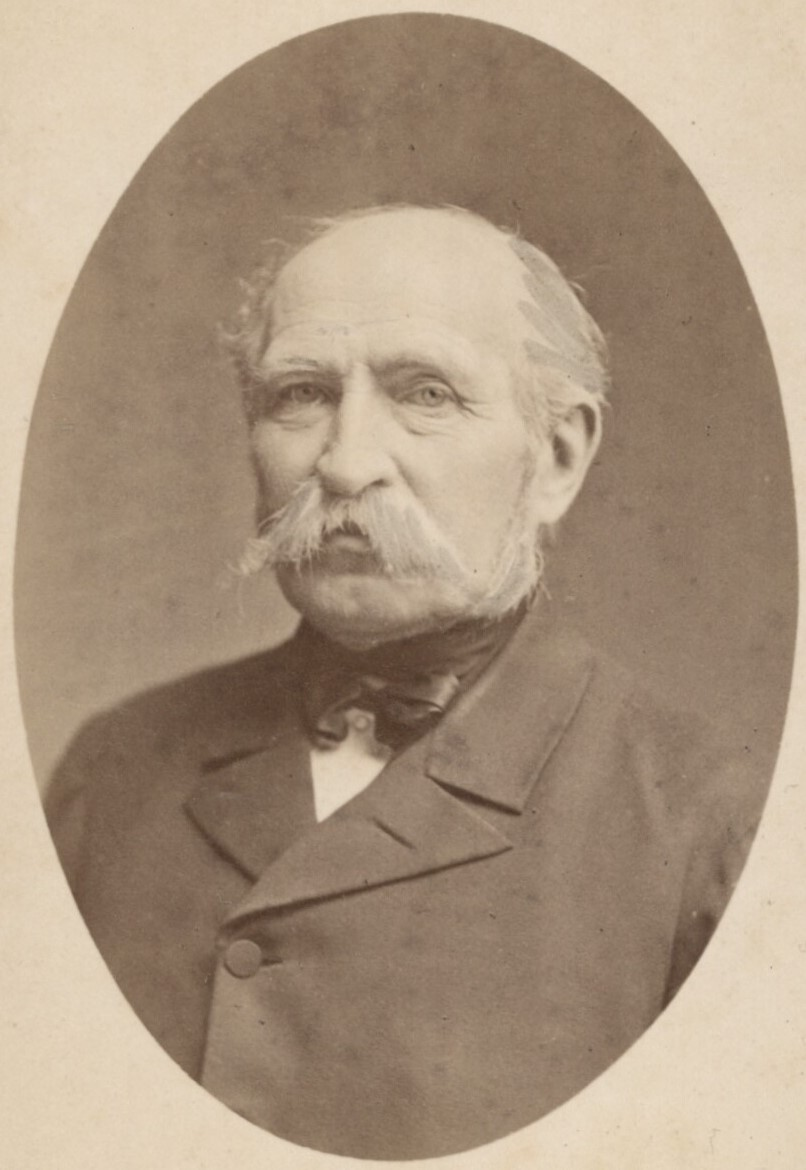

Minister of War of Denmark
- In office 26 July 1874 – 11 June 1875
- Monarch: Christian IX
- Prime Minister: Christen Andreas Fonnesbech
- Preceded by: Niels Frederik Ravn
- Succeeded by: Wolfgang von Haffner

Personal details
- Born: 8 July 1812 Copenhagen, Denmark-Norway
- Died: 16 February 1894 (aged 81) Tybjerggaard, Næstved Municipality, Denmark

Military service
- Allegiance: Denmark
- Branch: Royal Danish Army
- Years of service: 1823—1882
- Rank: General
- Battles/wars: First Schleswig War; Battle of Kolding; Skirmish of Århus; Second Schleswig War; Battle of Sankelmark (WIA)

Peter Frederik Steinmann (8 July 1812 – 16 February 1894) was an officer in the Royal Danish Army who served in the First and Second Schleswig Wars and was briefly Minister of War.

Steinmann entered military service in 1823 at the age of 11. He rose through the ranks of the army during the First and Second Schleswig Wars, being granted the rank of major general and awarded the Grand Cross of the Dannebrog in 1864. He was Minister of War during the brief cabinet of Christen Andreas Fonnesbech from 1874 to 1875. He spent the later part of his career as the commanding general in Jutland, before retiring to his estate, Tybjerggaard, in 1882.

== Early life and education ==
Peter Frederik Steinmann was born on 8 July 1812 in Copenhagen to Lieutenant General Peter Frederik Steinmann (born 1782) and Johanne Birgitte Mette Dorothea de Neergaard. He entered military service in 1823 and in 1826, was made an artillery cadet. In 1830, he was promoted to second lieutenant in the artillery with seniority from 1826. He enrolled immediately in the recently established Royal Danish Defence College, from which he graduated four years later as a first lieutenant. However, he did not officially enter into military service until after going through training with the infantry and cavalry schools. In 1839 he became adjutant of the General Staff, and the following year he made a tour of duty to most European states, after which in 1841 was made a Captain.

On 11 August 1841, he married Anna Johanne Elisabeth Countess Schulin (30 October 1813 in Frederiksdal – 10 September 1847 in Copenhagen), daughter of Chamberlain, County Governor Sigismund Ludvig Schulin.

Steinmann he had previously accompanied Adjutant General Carl Ewald on a bathing trip to the south of France, which he also did in 1842. In the same year he was appointed captain of the General Staff, and since he had considerable worldly experience in addition to considerable skill, he was sent to Lüneburg in 1843 to take part in the preparations for the 10th German Federal Corps' camp assembly, and was later sent to various other troop assemblies in Germany. In 1843 he also became a Knight of Dannebrog.

== First Schleswig War ==
Due to poor health, he travelled to the hot springs in Bad Ems to recuperate in 1846, before returning for training in the autumn. After his wife died on 10 September 1847, he travelled to Italy during the winter. It was while he was in Italy that he learned of the outbreak of the First Schleswig War in March 1848, at which point he immediately returned to Denmark. He was not immediately given an active command but was instead employed as chief of staff at the general command on Funen. In May he succeeded in becoming chief of staff of the right flank corps, being promoted to major. However, after General Frederik Bülow to command of the corps, he was forced to return to his former position.

As a result, Steinmann did not see active duty until the following year, when he became chief of staff to General Olaf Rye. As chief of staff to Rye, he took part i the battles at Kolding, Almind-Dons, Vijle, and Århus. During this tour in Jutland, he was awarded so many merits that by June he was promoted to lieutenant colonel. He did not follow Rye to Fredericia, instead entering the service of Carl Ludvig Henrik Flindt as his chief of staff in Helgenæs. When Flindt's corps were disbanded in September, Steinmann returned to the general command on Funen.

In the following year, Steinmann was employed as chief of staff to General Anthon Carl Frederik Moltke at the 1st Division. Under Moltke's command, he participated in the battle of Helligbæk and in the Battle of Isted, after which he was awarded the Dannebrogordenens Hæderstegn. After peace was agreed and the war ended, Steinmann became chief of staff at the General Command in Schleswig, a difficult position which he held, with a short interruption from 1853 to 1854, until the autumn of 1862. While in that post, he was promoted to colonel in 1854 and to major general in 1862. He later became Commander of the Dannebrog in 1857 and participated in several troop gatherings, as well as the 1858 exercises of the 10th Federal Corps.

== Second Schleswig War ==
In the spring of 1863, he was assigned to the 3rd Infantry Brigade, with which he participated in the troop assembly at Schleswig the same autumn. On 22 October he took over command of the 3rd General Command District after Lieutenant General Georg Schøller's death. He then became 1st Division Commander on 1 November 1863 with staff quarters in Kiel. There he was given a difficult task, as the 1st Division was tasked with ensuring the Army's possible advance in the Danevirke, while also keeping the population in check and threatening a federal execution. Only 3 days before the German troops moved into Holstein on 23 December, he was given the necessary instructions for his position, stating that he should eventually evacuate the duchy, which was also completed on 29 December.

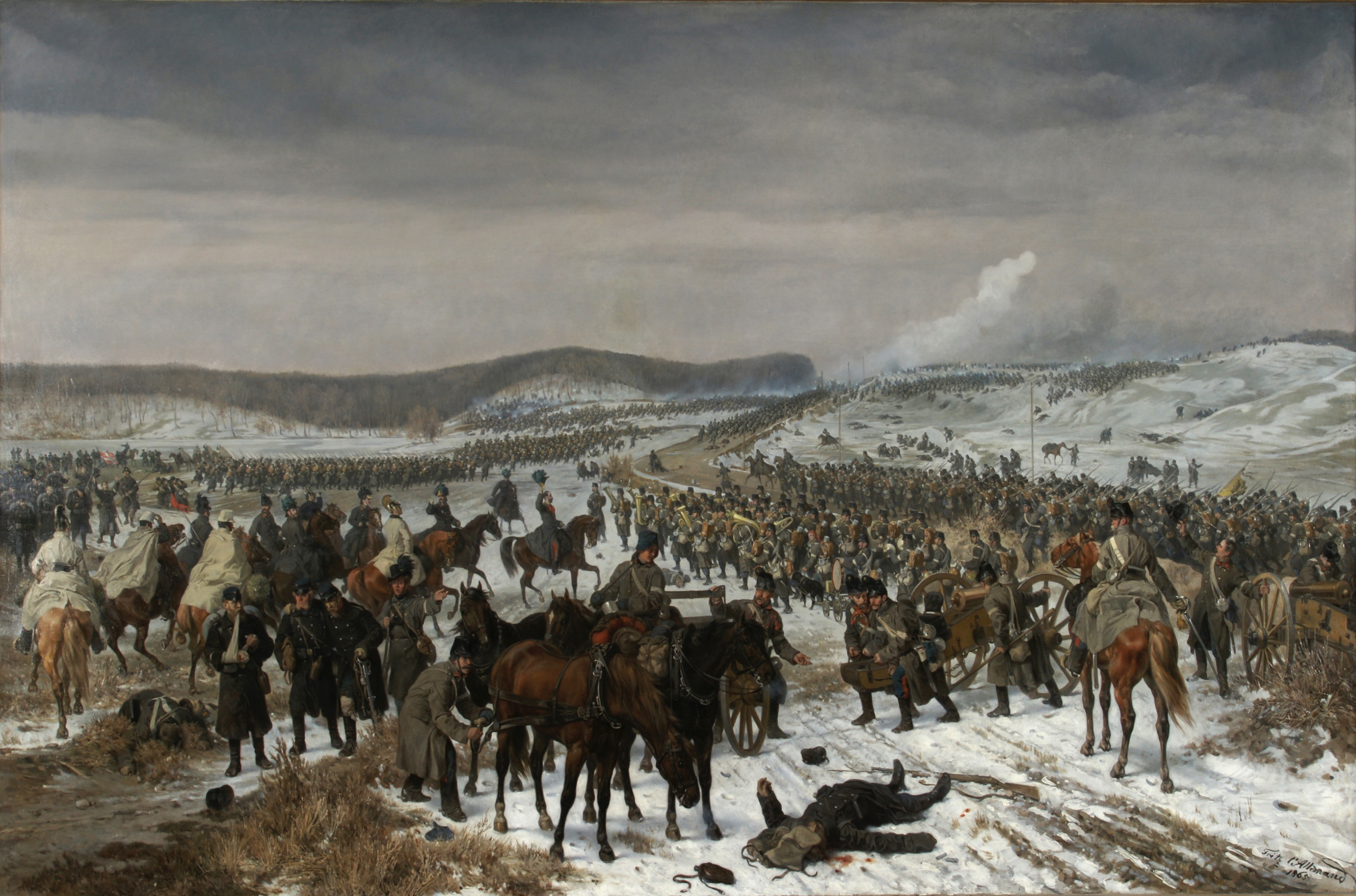
Fritz L'Allemand's 1865 painting of the Battle of Sankelmark, where Steinmann was wounded.

From the beginning of January 1864, the 3rd Division occupied the Dannevirke position from Schlei to fortification no. 13. The corps' position at Selk and Jagel was attacked by Austrian forces on 3 February, while it was handed over to the division, as the evacuation was to be launched two days later to form the army's rear guard. At the Battle of Sankelmark, Steinmann he was wounded in the leg by a piece of grenade. Without noticing, however, he sat on horseback, and only after the fight was over did he ride back to Flensburg, where he had to be lifted off the saddle and then sent to the Garrison Hospital in Copenhagen. Even before the wound was healed, he enlisted in the field army on 12 April and was then given command of the 1st Division. The next day, the 1st Division moved into Dybbøl, where it saw action at the Battle of Dybbøl on 18 April.

When the high command was then relocated to Funen, he became commander-in-chief at Als. In this position, he firmly warned against withdrawing too many troops from Funen, but his warnings were not heeded. When the Prussians attacked on 29 June, the 2nd Brigade made a failed attempt to recapture Kærby. Steinmann gave the order to retreat at about 5:30 in the morning, thus cementing the loss of Als. The government did not blame Steinmann's leadership for the loss. Instead, he seems to have made a good impression as he was made a lieutenant general on 4 July, and the very next day appointed supreme general. By 12 July, armistice negotiations were underway, giving Steinmann the opportunity to make very careful arrangements for Funen's defense.

== Minister of War ==
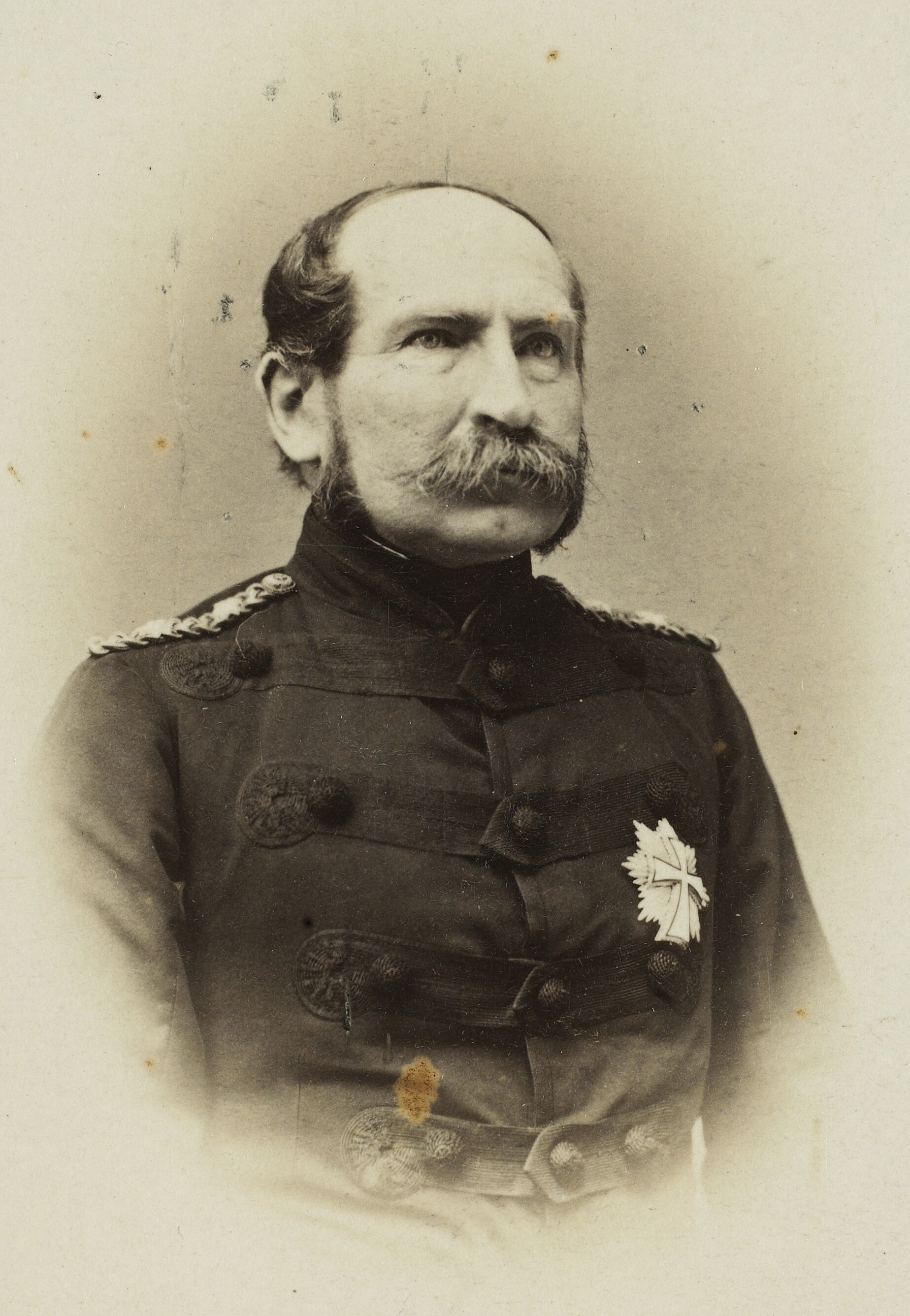
Steinmann decorated with the Grand Cross of the Dannebrog, c. 1864

Steinmann was awarded the Grand Cross of the Dannebrog on 1 November 1864. After the Treaty of Vienna, he was appointed the Commanding General of Jutland, in which position he won the respect and devotion from both his subordinates and the civilian population and inherited the estate of Tybjerggaard from his father.

When the Fonnesbach Ministry was formed on 26 August 1874, he was urged to take part as it was believed that he would be able to improve the country's neglected defense system. He disagreed with the defense system that the former Minister of War, Christian Albert Frederich Thomsen, had implemented until his resignation. Unlike Thomsen, Steinmann argued that the country's defenses should emphasize the Copenhagen Sea Fortress with the temporary abandonment of the land fortifications and the fortifications at the Great and Little Belt. He accepted the invitation to act as Minister of War. During his tenure, he was accommodating towards the United Venstre party, as he was willing to reduce the initial training period for infantry forces from 6 down to 5 months. However, he did not succeed in putting any of his proposals through before the entire ministry resigned on 11 June 1875.

== Later life ==
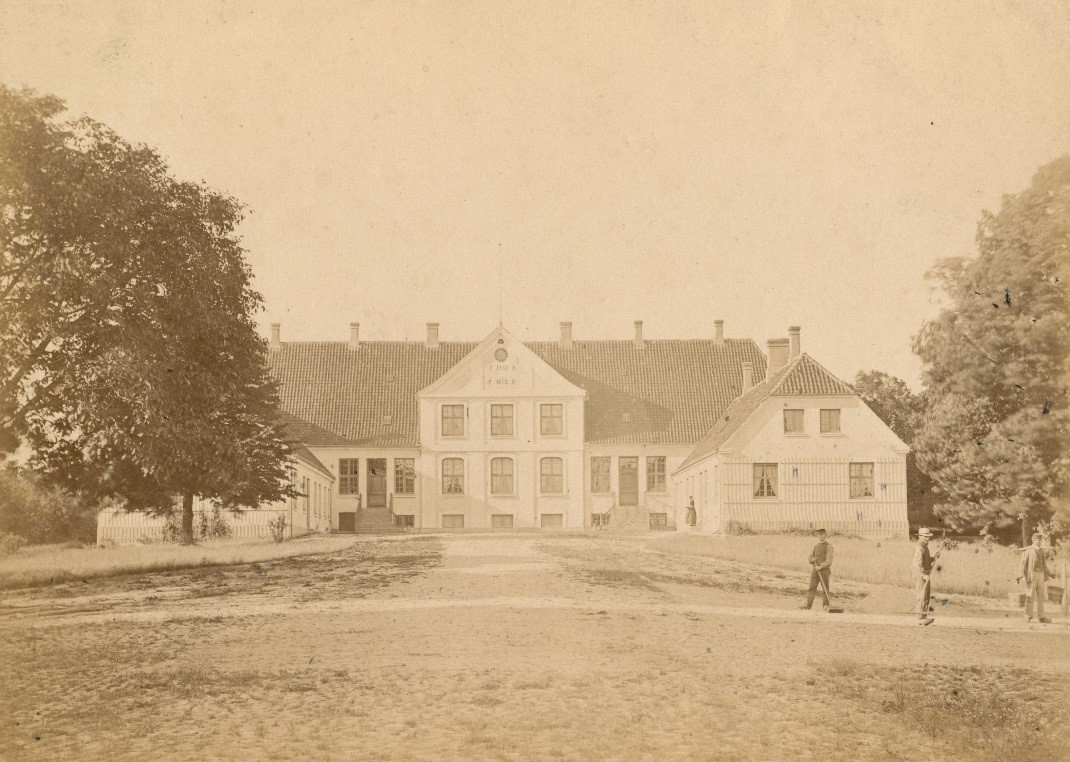
The Tybjerggaard estate which Steinmann inherited in 1866, and where he retired to in 1882.

When it proved difficult to fill the post of commanding general in Jutland, Steinmann was asked to take it over again in December 1877. He remained there until he was dismissed due to age in 1882, while at the same time being granted à la suite. Steinmann then retired to his estate Tybjerggaard, where he often gathered a larger circle of older and younger comrades around him and with lively interest continued to follow the development of events. He was considered a brave soldier and a very conscientious, punctual superior who was thoroughly familiar with the Army's administrative regulations and had a clear eye for terrain and fighting conditions.

He died on 16 February 1894 and was buried at the Tybjerg Church. Steinmannsgade in Frederiksbjerg, Aarhus was named after him in 1911.
