= Hürup (Amt) =

Municipality in Schleswig-Holstein, Germany

- Amt
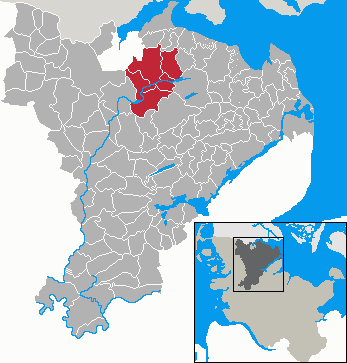
- Map of Schleswig-Flensburg highlighting Hürup
- Interactive map of Hürup
- Location within Germany Location within Schleswig-Holstein
- Coordinates: 54°45′N 9°31′E
- Country: Germany
- State: Schleswig-Holstein
- District: Schleswig-Flensburg
- Seat: Hürup
- Subdivisions: 5 municipalities

Area
  - Total: 96.88 km^{2} (37.41 sq mi)

Population (2025-12-31)
  - Total: 8,661
  - Density: 89.40/km^{2} (231.5/sq mi)
- Time zone: UTC+01:00 (CET)
  - Summer (DST): UTC+02:00 (CEST)
- Vehicle registration: SL
- Website: www.amt-huerup.de

Hürup is an Amt ("collective municipality") in the district of Schleswig-Flensburg, in Schleswig-Holstein, Germany. The seat of the Amt is in Hürup.

The Amt Hürup consists of the following municipalities:

- Ausacker
- Freienwill
- Großsolt
- Hürup
- Husby
