= Ågård, Denmark =

Village in Vejle Municipality, Southern Denmark

Ågård
- Village
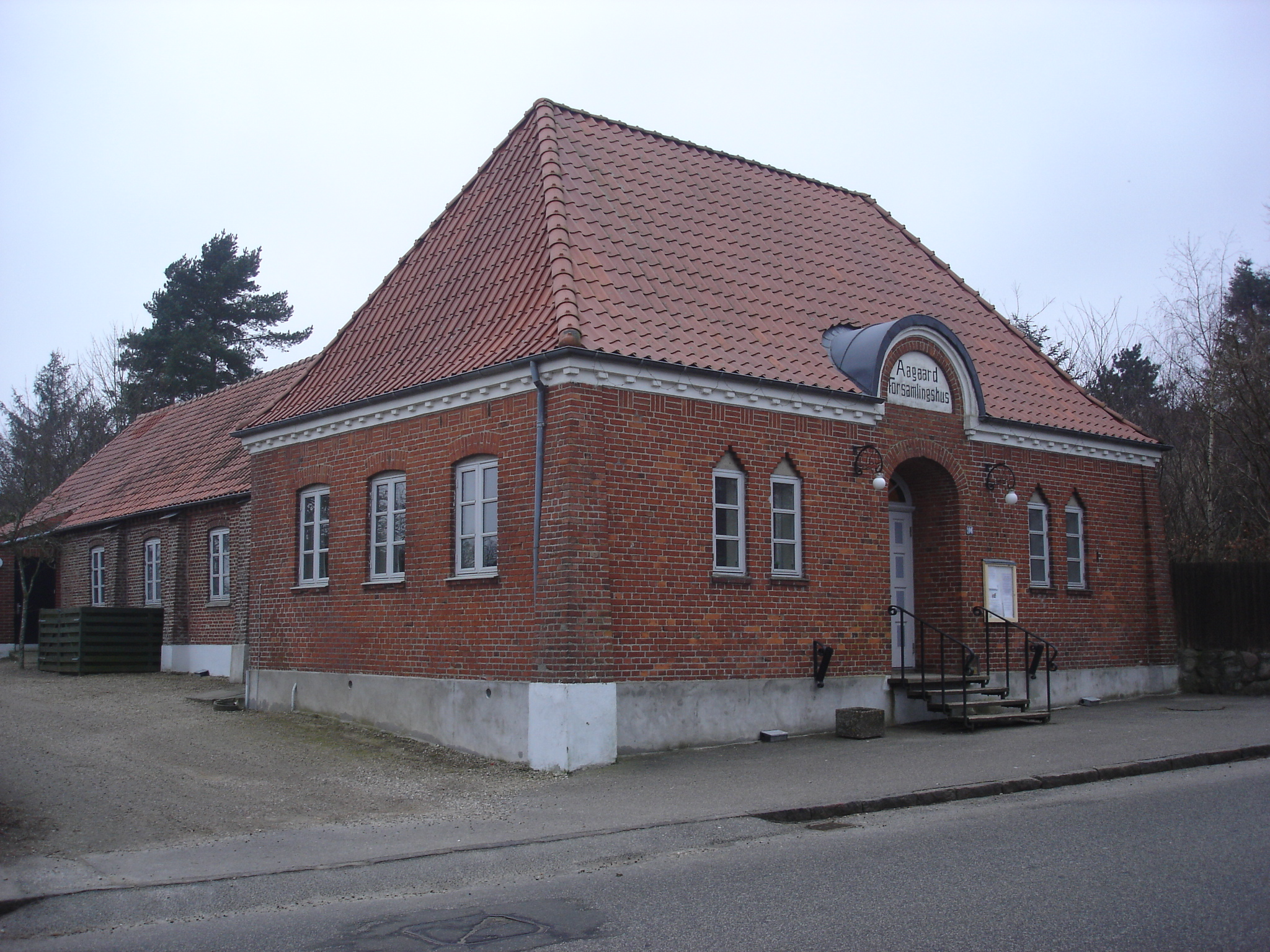
- The village hall in Ågård

- Location within Denmark Location within Region of Southern Denmark
- Coordinates: 55°35′8″N 9°25′27″E
- Country: Denmark
- Region: Southern Denmark
- Municipality: Vejle Municipality

Area
  - Urban: 1 km^{2} (0.39 sq mi)

Population (2026)
  - Urban: 1,358
  - Urban density: 1,400/km^{2} (3,500/sq mi)
- Time zone: UTC+1 (CET)
  - Summer (DST): UTC+2 (CEST)
- Postal code: DK-6040 Egtved

Ågård is a village in Vejle Municipality, Region of Southern Denmark in Denmark. The old village of Ågård has merged with the former railway town of Gravens to the north. Together they form a small urban area, with a population of 1,358 (1 January 2026).

Ågård is located 9 km east of Egtved, 15 km north of Kolding and 17 km southwest of Vejle.

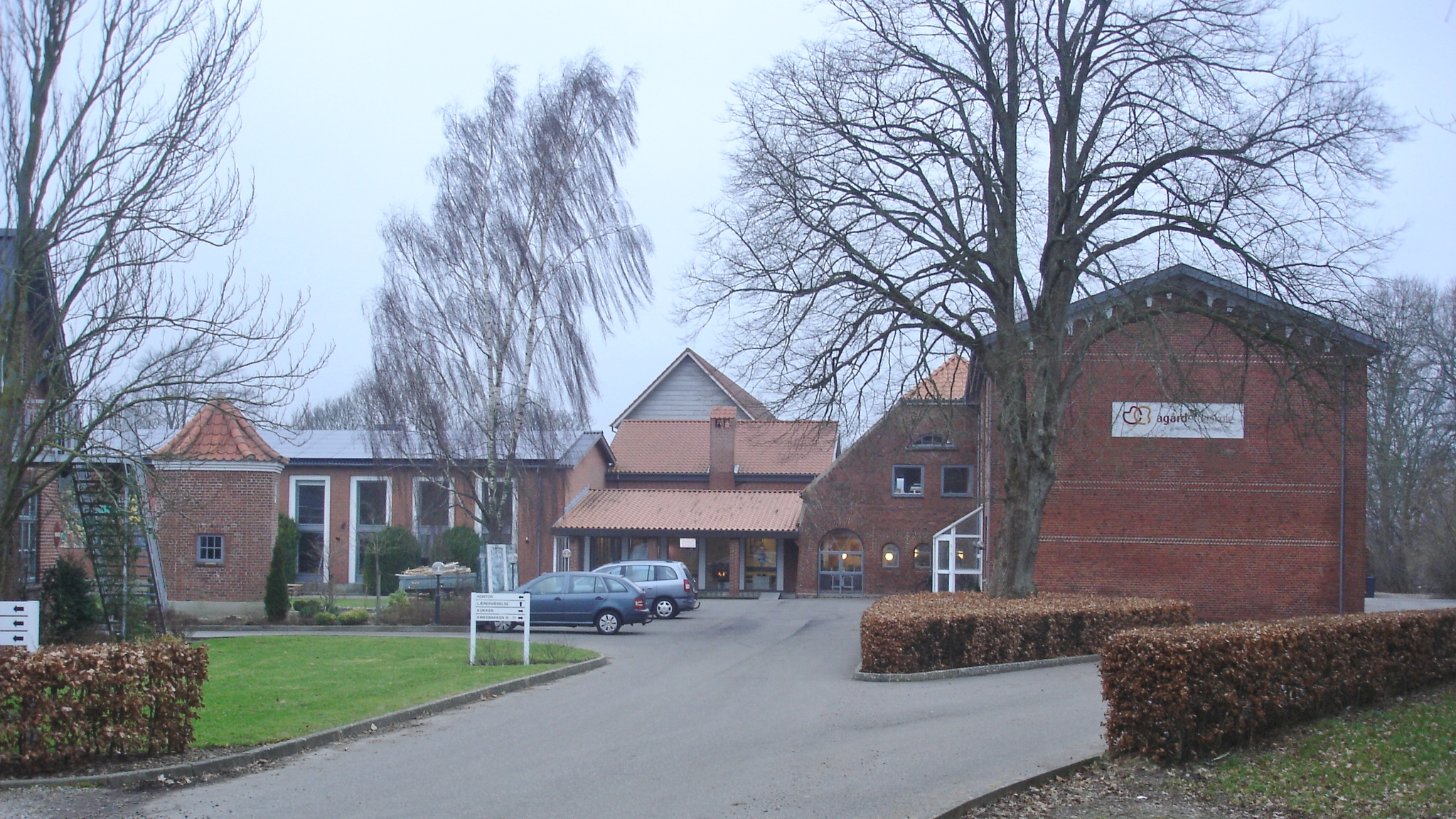
Ågård Efterskole

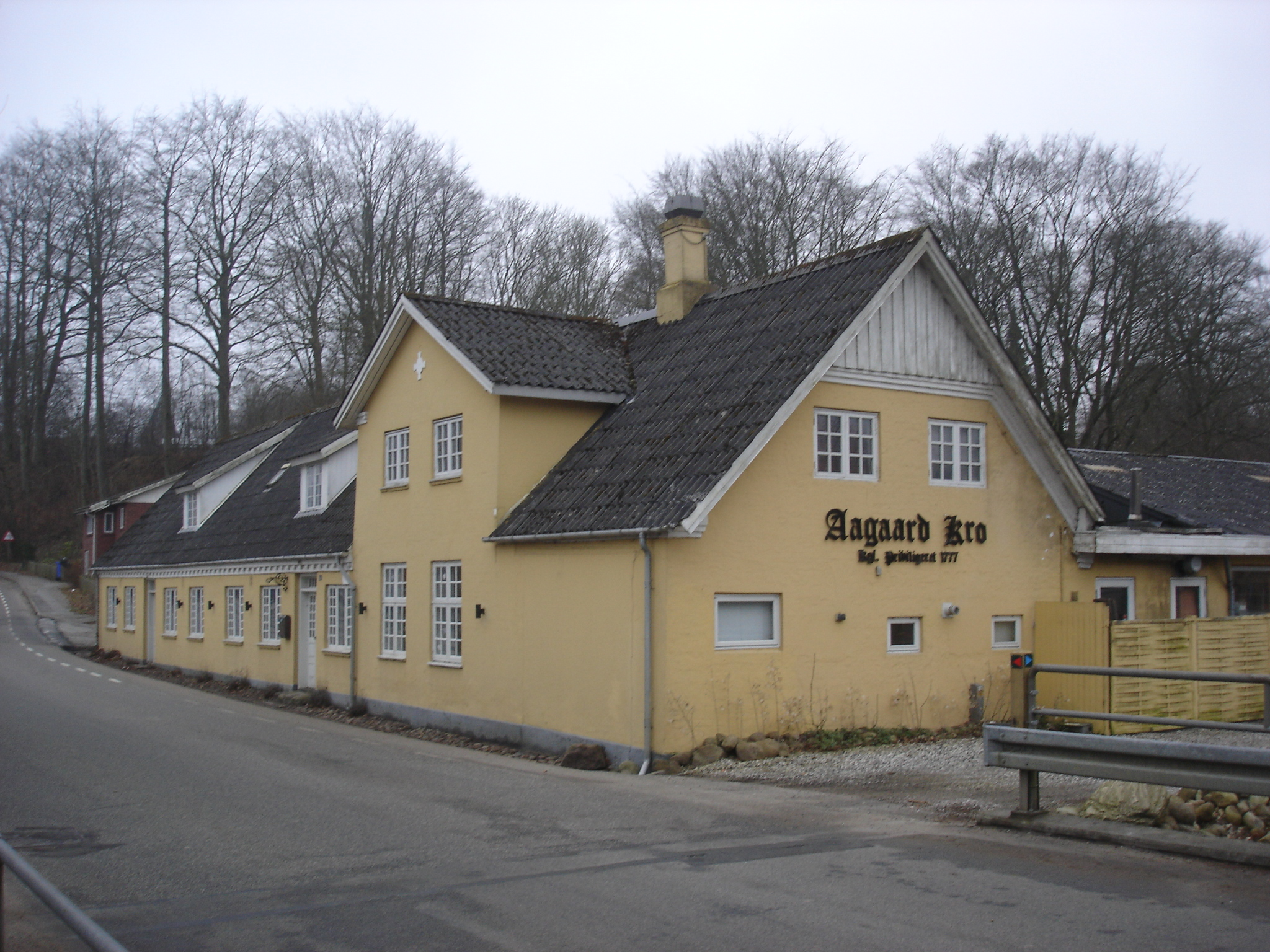
Ågård Kro (Ågård Inn)

Ågård Efterskole and Ågård Kro (Ågård Inn) are located in the village.
