= Tastrup =

Tastrup Tostrup
- Ortsteil of Hürup
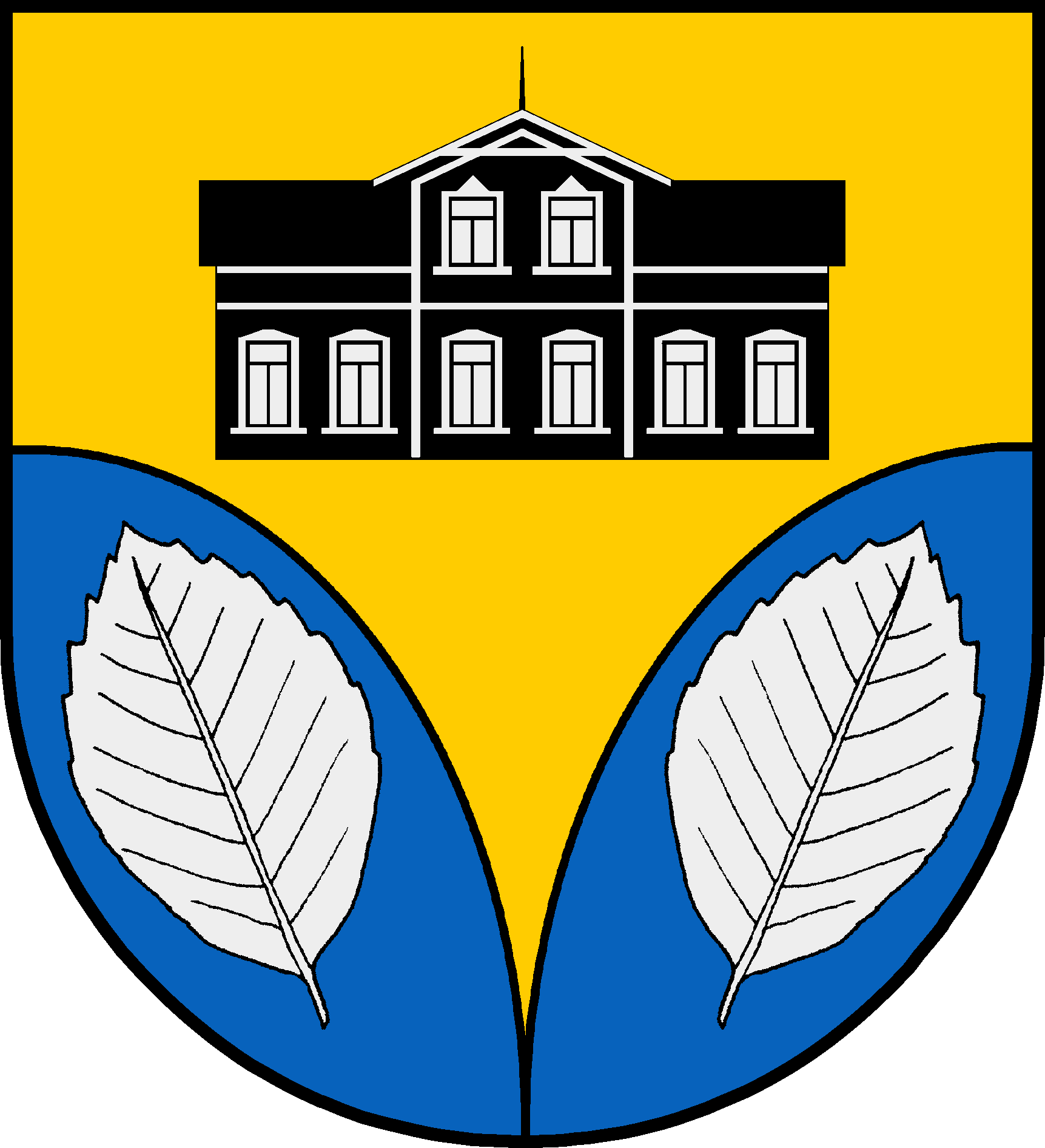
- Coat of arms
- Interactive map of Tastrup
- Location within Germany Location within Schleswig-Holstein
- Coordinates: 54°45′59″N 9°28′37″E
- Country: Germany
- State: Schleswig-Holstein
- District: Schleswig-Flensburg
- Municipality: Hürup

Area
  - Total: 4.16 km^{2} (1.61 sq mi)
- Elevation: 50 m (160 ft)

Population (2021-12-31)
  - Total: 395
  - Density: 95.0/km^{2} (246/sq mi)
- Time zone: UTC+01:00 (CET)
  - Summer (DST): UTC+02:00 (CEST)
- Postal codes: 24943
- Dialling codes: 0461
- Vehicle registration: SL
- Website: www.amthuerup.de

Tastrup (German pronunciation: [ˈtastʁup]; Danish: Tostrup) is a village and a former municipality in the district of Schleswig-Flensburg, in Schleswig-Holstein, Germany. On 1 March 2023 it became part of the municipality Hürup.
