= Oeversee =

Oeversee Oversø
- Municipality
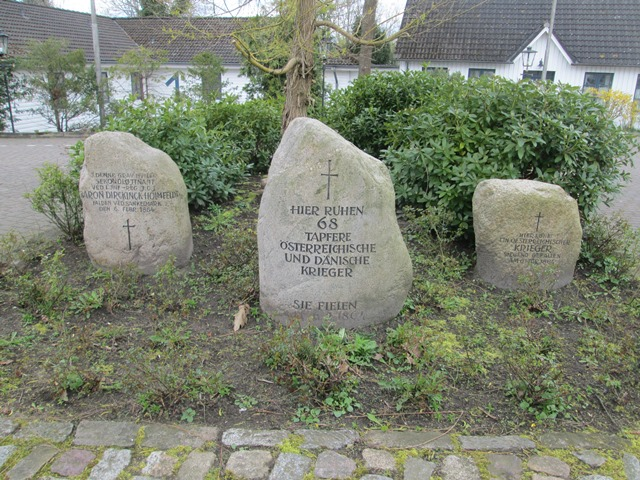
- Memorial to the Battle of Sankelmark in Oeversee

- Coat of arms

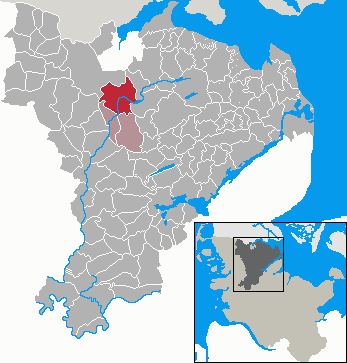
- Location of Oeversee; Oversø within Schleswig-Flensburg district
- Interactive map of Oeversee; Oversø
- Location within Germany Location within Schleswig-Holstein
- Coordinates: 54°42′23″N 09°26′10″E
- Country: Germany
- State: Schleswig-Holstein
- District: Schleswig-Flensburg
- Municipal assoc.: Oeversee

Government
  - Mayor: Hans-Heinrich Jensen-Hansen (CDU)

Area
  - Total: 36.35 km^{2} (14.03 sq mi)
- Elevation: 31 m (102 ft)

Population (2025-12-31)
  - Total: 3,568
  - Density: 98.16/km^{2} (254.2/sq mi)
- Time zone: UTC+01:00 (CET)
  - Summer (DST): UTC+02:00 (CEST)
- Postal codes: 24987–24988
- Dialling codes: 04630 & 04638
- Vehicle registration: SL
- Website: www.amtoeversee.de

Oeversee (Danish: Oversø) is a municipality in the district of Schleswig-Flensburg, in Schleswig-Holstein, Germany. It is situated approximately 10 km south of Flensburg. The Oeversee municipality was merged with Sankelmark on March 1, 2008. The new municipality is, however, still called Oeversee.

Oeversee is part of the Amt ("collective municipality") Oeversee. The seat of the Amt is located in Tarp, which is close to Idstedt and Stolk, among other smaller towns in the area.

The area was the place of many battles between the Germans and the Danes. The village of Oeversee (or to be more precise, Sankelmark) witnessed, for example, a battle between Austrian and Danish forces in the Second Schleswig War on February 6, 1864. There are still annual memorial services held for this event and celebrating the helpfulness of the citizens of Flensburg.
The Austrian city of Graz named an alley and a school after Oeversee in recognition of this event, as the Austrian troops had been based in Graz. Returning the favor, Oeversee named a public square after Graz (Grazer Platz).
