= Sankelmark =

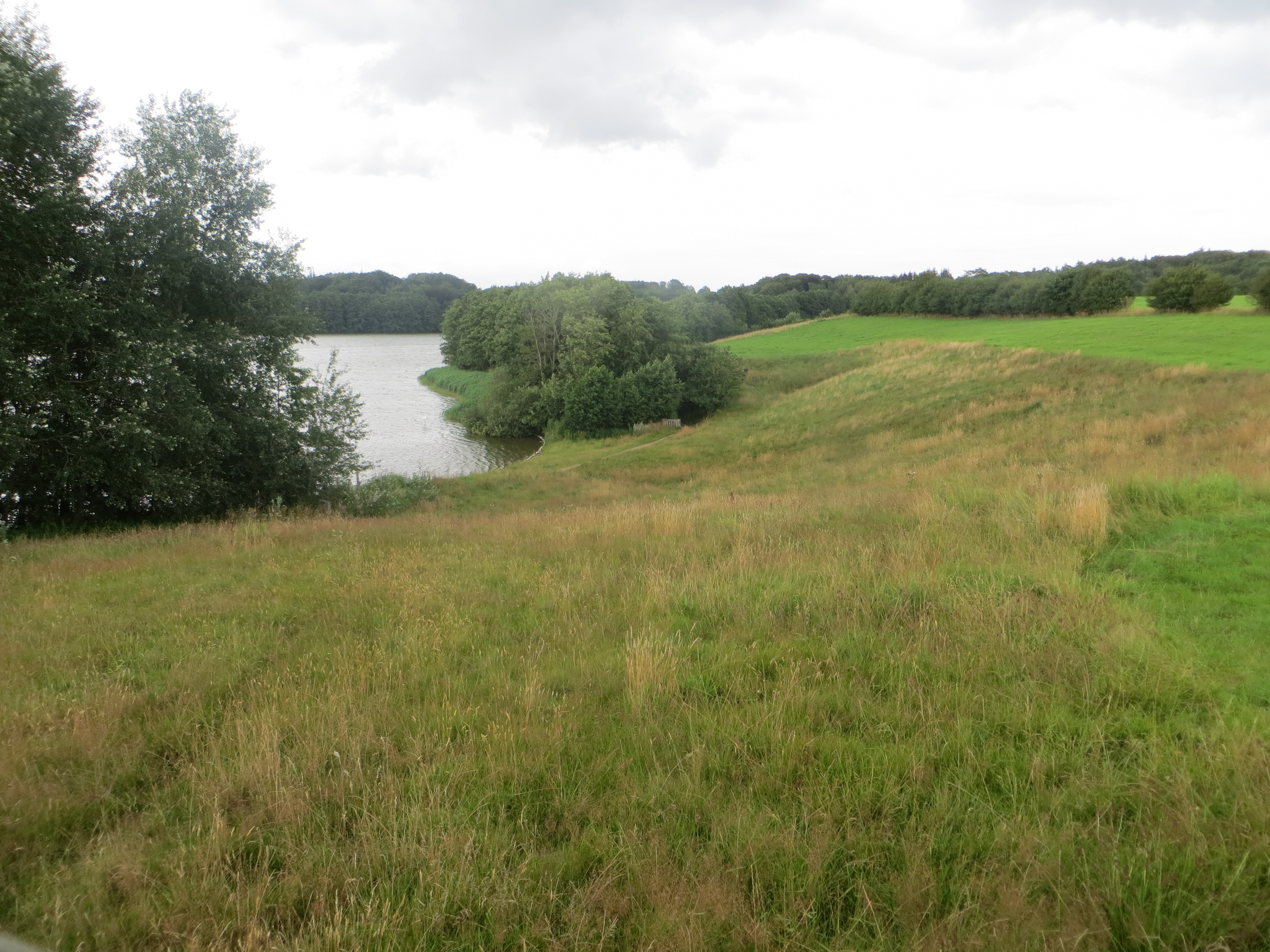
Sankelmarker See (east, July 2017)

Sankelmark is a former municipality in Schleswig-Holstein in Germany. It is about 5 miles south of Flensburg. There was a battle there in the Second War of Schleswig (1864). On March 1, 2008 Sankelmark was incorporated into Oeversee.
