= Tybjerggaard =

Manor house and estate in Denmark

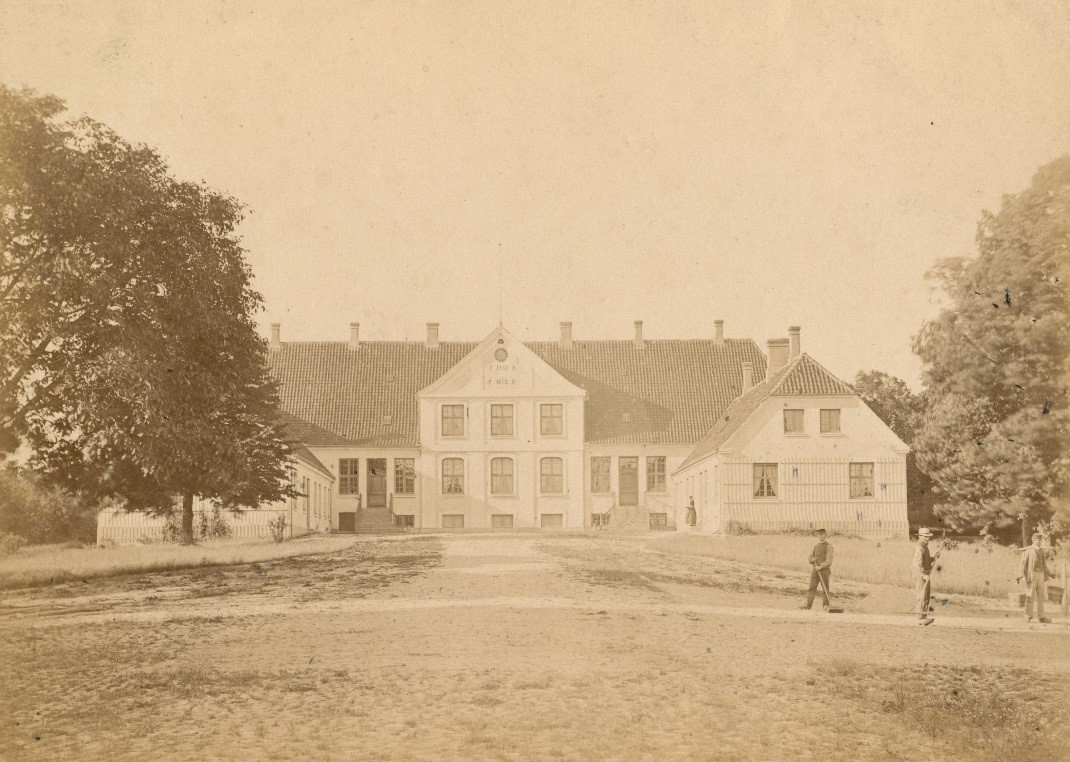
- Tybjerggaard in the late 19th century
- Interactive map of the Tybjerggaard area

General information
- Architectural style: Rococo
- Location: Næstved Municipality, Tybjergvej 20; 4160 Herlufmagle, Denmark
- Coordinates: 55°20′53.88″N 11°48′27″E
- Completed: 1763

Tybjerggaard is a manor house and estate in the parish of Tybjerg, Næstved Municipality, approximately 80 km southwest of Copenhagen, Denmark. The Rococo-style main building was built for Tyge Rothe in 1653. It was listed on the Danish registry of protected buildings and places in 1918. The estate covers 475 hectares of land.

The estate currently covers 475 hectares of land and is owned by Bent Jeppesen. Tybjerggaard-Fuglsang, one of the largest pig breeders in Denmark, is headquartered on the estate. It operates a number of production sites on Zealand and breeds Landrace, Yorkshire, and Duroc pigs.

== History ==
=== Early history ===
Its history of the estate dates back to the 13th century. The first known owner of the estate is Margrethe Jensdatter Sjællandsfar som. She is mentioned as the owner in 1235. It is likely that she had inherited the estate from her father Jens Sjællandsfar.

=== Basse and Godov ===
Tybjerggaard was later acquired by Peder Basse. His grandson Steen Basse died in 1448 as the last male member of the Basse family. His sister Sophie Basse, was married to Peder Godov. Steen Basse left Tybjerggaard to the brother-in-law on condition that they would name a son after him. Tybjerggaard remained in the Godov family until 1485.

=== Changing owners ===
Over the next centuries, its ownership was generally shared between multiple owners. This came to an end when Jacob Andersen Bjørn in the 1490s married Margrete Poulsdatter. Bjørn was also the owner of Voergaard and Støvringgaard but died shortly after the wedding.

After his death Margrethe managed the estates for many years, but she lived mostly at Støvringgård. Their son Anders died unmarried in 1536. The daughter Dorte Bjørn was married twice—first time to Christopher Hak of Egholm and second time to Oluf Glob of Vellumgård—but there were no children in either marriage After her death in circa 1562 the estate went to her cousin Anne Bjørnsdatter's children. The cousin was married to Niels Kaas. Tybjerggaard went to their son Bjørn Kaas while his brothers, Niels and Erik Kaas, inherited Støvringgård. Bjørn Kaas was also the owner of Staarupgård and lensmann of Vordingborg Castle. His son, Gabriel Kaas, ceded Tybjerggaard to Frederik Quitzow in exchange for other property in 1596. Quitzow had no children either and Tybjerggaard was therefore passed on to his wife's niece, Pernille Banner, who was married to Esge Krafse. Pernille Banner's eldest son, Erik Banner, had bought out his four brothers after their mother's death.

In 1672, Tybjerggaard was acquired by Ulrik Frederik Gyldenløve. A few years later he sold it to Peter Brandt who in turn sold it to the Crown.

Christian V granted Tybjerggaard to Adam Levin Knuth. In 1689, he sold it back to the crown. It was then ceded to Margrete Wilders as payment of an old debt to her late husband, the merchant Frederik Werdelmann (died 1687). She died on the estate in 1709. She left it to her niece, Margrete von Heinen, whose husband, Willum Braem. an infantry lieutenant, died in Austria in October that same year. She later married Georg Lepel. After her death in 1717, he converted the main building into a hospital for blind and invalids of the parish.

In 1824, Lepel sold Tybjerggaard to Frederik von Maase. His widow, Conradine Sophie Rostgaard, sold the estate to Peder West in 1735.

=== Tyge Rothe ===
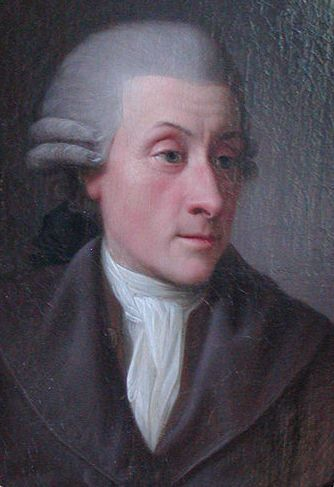
Thyge Rothe

In 1763, Tybjerggaard was acquired by Tyge Rothe. He had become wealthy through his recent marriage to Karen Bjørn, the only child of the late merchant and shipyard-owner Andreas Bjørn. He gave up his position in the Colonial Administration Authority (Generaltoldkammeret) to concentrate on managing the estate. Four of Rothe's six children were born at Tybjerggaard. Among these were the later Governor General of the Danish West Indies Carl Adolph Rothe and civil servant and Supreme Court justice Christian Hjørn Rothe.

Johann Friedrich Struensee appointed him as head of the new Finanskollegium's Department of Agriculture in 1771 but it was dissolved after Struense's fall from power and instead appointed as Country Governor in Segeberg. After nine months he was also dismissed from this post. He then settled on the Tubjerggaard estate and committed the rest of his life to his writings. He introduced many improvements in the management of the estate and started the implementation of the new agricultural reforms. His son, Andreas Bjørn Rothe, sold Tybjerggaard.

=== Neergaard and Steinmann families ===
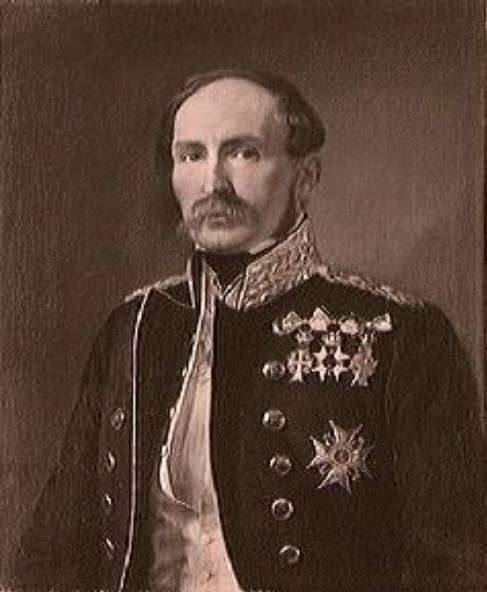
August Schiøtt: Frederik, Steinmann

In 1804, Tybjerggaard was acquired by Jacob Neergaard. He was the sixth child of Johan Thomas de Neergaard, the owner of Ringsted Abbey, Merløsegaard and Kærup, who had been ennobled under the name de Neergaard in 1780. His wife, Sophie Magdalene Dinesen, was a daughter of Anders Ninesen at Gyldenholm Manor.

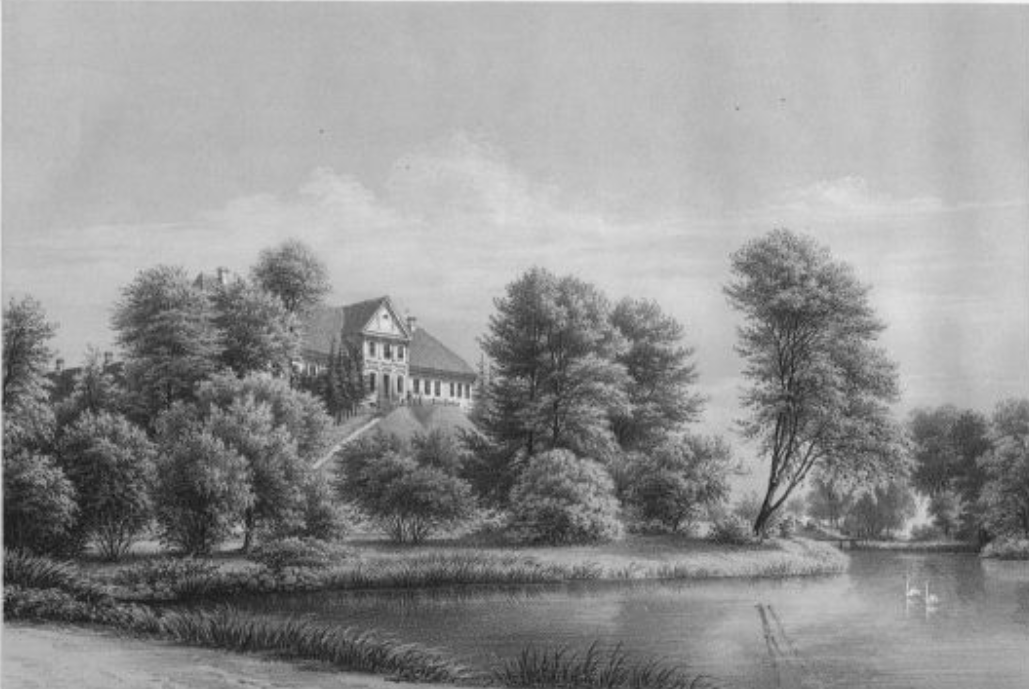
Tybjerggaard in 1870

Jacob de Neergaard died in 1833. In 1835, his widow brought Tybjerggaard into her second marriage with Peter Frederik Steinmann, who had previously been married to her late husband's younger sister Johanne (Hanne) de Neergaard (1792–1824).

Peter Frederik Steinmann's son by his first wife, who was also named Peter Frederik Steinmann, inherited Tybjerggaard in 1866. He was also a military officer and had served in the Second Schleswig War. In 1874–75, he briefly served as Minister of War in the Cabinet of Fonnesbech. He gad been married to Anne Elisabeth Johanne Schulin, Comtesse of Frederiksdal, but she had already died in 1947. Steinmann survived her by 47 years. Their son, again named Peter Frederik Steinmann, succeeded his father on the estate in 1894. His widow, Marie, a daughter of the naval officer, politician and editor Johan Cornelius Tuxen, lived on the estate until her death in 1952

== Architecture ==
The Rococo-style main building was built for Tyge Rothe in 1763. It is a single-storey, three-winged complex. The main wing features a higher median risalit topped by a triangular pediment on both sides of the building. The east wing incorporates elements from an older building, probably Margrethe Wilders' main wing from the 1690s. The vaulted cellar dates from the 15th century. The oldest of the farm buildings date from 1877. Others were added in 1917, 1927, 1958 in 1993.

== List of owners ==
- Jens Sjællandsfar, 1291–1300
- Margrethe Eberstein née Jensdatter Sjællandsfar, 1300–1305
- Henrik Albertsen Eberstein, 1305–1322
- Margrethe Eberstein née Jensdatter Sjællandsfar, 1322–1327
- Cecilie Henriksdatter Eberstein, 1327–1360
- Peder Ludvigsen Eberstein, 1360–1382
- Peder Basse, 1382–1397
- Tyge Basse, 1397–1408
- Sten Tygesen Basse, 1408–1446
- Torben Bille, 1446–1448
- Sophie Godov née Bille, 1448–1459
- Peder Olufsen Godov, 1459–1469
- Anders Pedersen Godov & Oluf Pedersen Godov, 1469–1479
- Sten Andersen Godov, 1479–1485
- Cecilie Henriksen née Andersdatter Godov, 1485–1525
- Oluf Glob, 1525–1558
- Dorte Glob née Henriksen, 1558–1578
- Bjørn Kaas, 1578–1581
- Gabriel Kaas, 1581–1596
- Frederik Quitzow, 1596–1624
- Pernille Krafse née Banner, 1624–1655
- Erik Banner, 1655–1672
- Ulrik Frederik Gyldenløve, 1672–1678
- The Crown, 1678
- Adam Levin Knuth, 1678–1689
- The Crown, 1689
- Margrethe Werdelmann née Wilders, 1689–1708
- Anne Margrethe Heinen, 1708–1724
- Frederik von der Maase, 1724–1728
- Conradine Sophie von der Maase née Rostgaard, 1728–1735
- Peter West, 1735–1763
- Tyge Rothe, 1763–1792
- Andreas Bjørn Rothe, 1792–1795
- Tycho Bræstrup, 1795
- Henrik Gregorius Lund, 1795–1798
- Christopher Schøller Bülow, 1798–1804
- Jacob Johansen de Neergaard, 1804–1833
- Sophie Magdalene de Neergaard née Dinesen, 1833–1835
- Peter Frederik Steinmann, 1835–1854
- Sophie Magdalene Steinmann née Dinesen, 1854–1866
- Peter Frederik Steinmann, 1866–1894
- Peter Frederik Steinmann, 1894–1910
- Det Steinmannske Legat, 1910–1957
- Herlufsholm Skole og Gods, 1957–2004
- Bent Jeppesen, 2004–present
