= Freienwill =

- Municipality
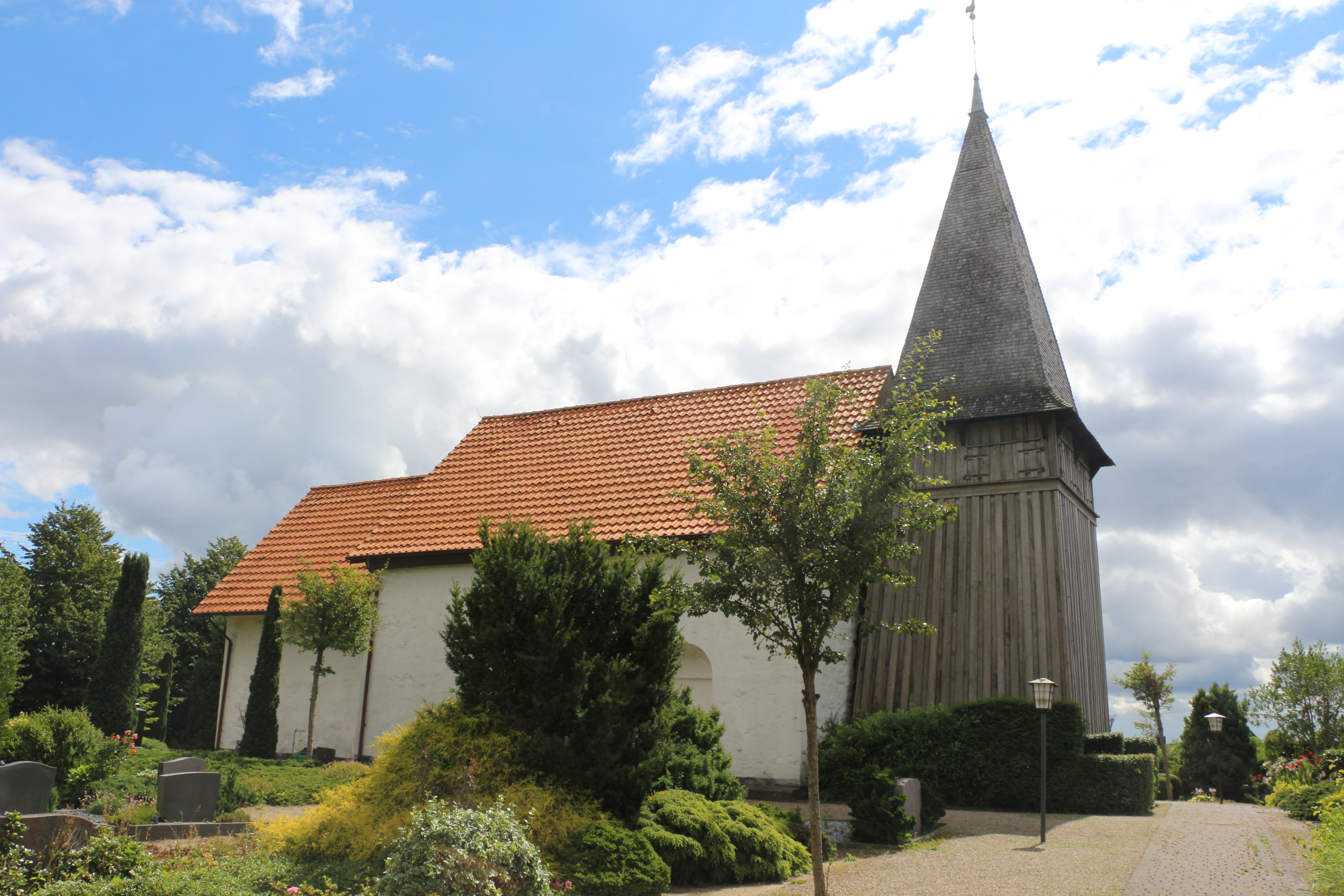
- Church in Freienwill

- Coat of arms

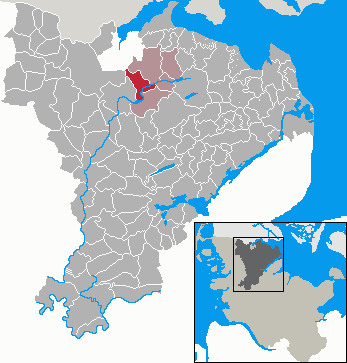
- Location of Freienwill within Schleswig-Flensburg district
- Interactive map of Freienwill
- Location within Germany Location within Schleswig-Holstein
- Coordinates: 54°43′N 9°30′E
- Country: Germany
- State: Schleswig-Holstein
- District: Schleswig-Flensburg
- Municipal assoc.: Hürup

Government
  - Mayor: Hans Heinrich Christiansen

Area
  - Total: 15.31 km^{2} (5.91 sq mi)
- Elevation: 39 m (128 ft)

Population (2025-12-31)
  - Total: 1,619
  - Density: 105.7/km^{2} (273.9/sq mi)
- Time zone: UTC+01:00 (CET)
  - Summer (DST): UTC+02:00 (CEST)
- Postal codes: 24991
- Dialling codes: 04602
- Vehicle registration: SL
- Website: www.freienwill.de

Freienwill is a municipality in the district of Schleswig-Flensburg, in Schleswig-Holstein, Germany.
