= Bundesstraße 76 =

Federal highway in Germany

B 76
- Bundesstraße 76

Route information
- Length: 130 km (81 mi) (partially replaced by Landstraße)

Major junctions
- Northwest end: Schleswig
- Southwest end: Lübeck borough of Travemünde

Location
- Country: Germany
- States: Schleswig-Holstein

Highway system
- Roads in Germany; Autobahns; List; Federal; List; State; E-roads

The Bundesstraße 76 is a German federal road or Bundesstraße and the northeast–southwest link between (formerly Flensburg), Schleswig, Kiel and Lübeck in the eastern part of the state of Schleswig-Holstein.

== Route ==
The B 76 used to begin at the German-Danish border at Flensburg. Due to the construction of the A 7 motorway the section between Flensburg and Schleswig was downgraded to a state road. The B 76 bypasses Schleswig on the left side and has junctions with the B 201 at the north and the B 77 at the south where the main carriageway continues towards Rendsburg. The route continues towards Eckernförde where it meets the B 203. At Gettorf the route extends to a dual carriageway and crosses the Kiel Canal via the Levensau High Bridge. At Kiel the route acts as the local motorway. It has interchanges with the B 503, A 215, B 404 and the B 502. At Schwentinental the dual carriageway ends. Afterwards it bypasses Preetz and at Plön it crosses the B 430. After it bypasses Eutin the Route is interrupted by the A 1 motorway at Haffkrug. At Scharbeutz the route continues again and goes through Timmendorfer Strand untin it finally ends in Travemünde with a junction with the B 75.

== Major junctions ==
State	District	Location	km	mi	Exit	Name	Destinations	Notes
Western bypass of Flensburg now part of B 200
Schleswig-Holstein	Flensburg	Südstadt				Flensburg-Süd	B 199 – Kappeln, Glücksburg; B 200 – Husum, Hamburg/Kiel ( A 7); B 199 / B 200 – Niebüll, Aabenraa	former junction of B 76
Schleswig-Holstein	No junctions along Jarplund and Oeversee							
Schleswig-Holstein	Schleswig-Flensburg	Sieverstedt				Sieverstedt	Sieverstedt, Stenderupau	former route of B 76
Schleswig-Holstein	Schleswig-Flensburg	Idstedt				Idstedt	Böklund, Jübek	former route of B 76
Schleswig-Holstein	Schleswig-Flensburg	Schuby				transition from state road	Flensburg	northwestern endpoint of federal road
Schleswig-Holstein	Schleswig-Flensburg	Schuby				Schleswig-Nord	B 201 – Kappeln, Husum, A 7	
Schleswig-Holstein	Schleswig-Flensburg	Schleswig				Schleswig-Gottorf	Schleswig-Zentrum, Schloss Gottorf	
Schleswig-Holstein	Schleswig-Flensburg	Busdorf				Schleswig-Busdorf	B 77 – Rendsburg, Itzehoe, A 7	main carriageway continues along the B 77
Schleswig-Holstein	No junctions along Fahrdorf and Fleckeby							
Schleswig-Holstein	Rendsburg-Eckernförde	Eckernförde				Eckernförde-Nord	B 203 – Rieseby, Kappeln	Northern endpoint of concurrency with the B 203
Schleswig-Holstein	Rendsburg-Eckernförde	Eckernförde				Eckernförde-Rendsburger Straße	B 203 – Rendsburg, Heide	Southern endpoint of concurrency with the B 203 cross-level intersection
Schleswig-Holstein	Rendsburg-Eckernförde	No junctions along southern Eckernförde						
Schleswig-Holstein	Rendsburg-Eckernförde	Altenhof				Schnellmark	Surendorf	
Schleswig-Holstein	Rendsburg-Eckernförde	No junctions along Neudorf						
Schleswig-Holstein	Rendsburg-Eckernförde	Gettorf				Gettorf-Nord	Gettorf	Incomplete junction: no ramps between Gettorf and Kiel
Schleswig-Holstein	Rendsburg-Eckernförde	Gettorf				Gettorf-Mitte	Gettorf, Osdorf	
Schleswig-Holstein	Rendsburg-Eckernförde	Tüttendorf				Gettorf-Süd	Gettorf	Incomplete junction: no ramps between Gettorf and Eckernförde
Schleswig-Holstein	Rendsburg-Eckernförde	Tüttendorf				Wulfshagen	Wulfshagen	
Schleswig-Holstein	Rendsburg-Eckernförde	Felm				Neuwittenbek/Altenholz	Neuwittenbek, Altenholz, Felm, Levensau	
Schleswig-Holstein	Kiel	Suchsdorf				Levensau High Bridge	Kiel Canal	
Schleswig-Holstein	Kiel	Suchsdorf				Kiel-Suchsdorf	Suchsdorf, Projensdorf	
Schleswig-Holstein	Kiel	Wik				Kiel-Stadion	B 503 – Kiel-Holtenau, Altenholz	
Schleswig-Holstein	Kiel	Schreventeich				Kronshagen-Nord	Kronshagen-Nord, Kiel-Zentrum	
Schleswig-Holstein	Kiel	Schreventeich				Kronshagen-Süd	Kronshagen-Süd, Kiel-Zentrum	
Schleswig-Holstein	Kiel	Südfriedhof			2	Kiel-Mitte	A 215 – Hamburg, Flensburg ( A 7), Rendsburg ( A 210), Kiel-Zentrum	Western endpoint of concurrency with the B 202
Schleswig-Holstein	Kiel	Südfriedhof				Kiel-Saarbrückenstraße	Kiel-IKEA, Kiel-CITTI PARK, Kiel-Westring	
Schleswig-Holstein	Kiel	Südfriedhof				Kiel-Winterbeker Weg	Kiel-REWE Center, Kiel-Hassee	
Schleswig-Holstein	Kiel	Hassee				Kiel-Hamburger Chaussee	Kiel-Rondeel, Schulensee	
Schleswig-Holstein	Kiel	Gaarden-Süd/Kronsburg				Kiel-Barkauer Kreuz	B 404 – Kiel-Wellsee, Bad Segeberg, Hamburg	
Schleswig-Holstein	Kiel	Gaarden-Süd/Kronsburg				Kiel-Barkauer Kreuz	A 21 – Hamburg, Berlin, Lüneburg	proposed motorway will end here
Schleswig-Holstein	Kiel	Gaarden-Süd/Kronsburg				Kiel-Joachimsplatz	Kiel-Zentrum, Kiel-HDW	Incomplete Junction: na ramps between Lübeck and Joachimsplatz Access through next junction
Schleswig-Holstein	Kiel	Gaarden-Süd/Kronsburg				Kiel-Ostring	B 502 – Schönkirchen, Heikendorf, Schönberg	
Schleswig-Holstein	Kiel	Gaarden-Süd/Kronsburg				Kiel-Wellsee	Kiel-Wellsee	Incomplete junction:no exit ramp Eckernförde → Wellsee Access through previous junction
Schleswig-Holstein	Kiel	Elmschenhagen				Kiel-Wellseedamm	Kiel-Wellsee, Kiel-Elmschenhagen	
Schleswig-Holstein	Kiel	Elmschenhagen				Kiel-Elmschenhagen-Mitte	Kiel-Elmschenhagen	
Schleswig-Holstein	Plön	Schwentinental				Schwentinental-Nord	Schwentinental-Klausdorf, Kiel-Wellingdorf	
Schleswig-Holstein	Plön	Schwentinental				Schwentinental	Schwentinental	
Schleswig-Holstein	Plön	Schwentinental				Schwentinental-Fernsichtweg	Schwentinental-Raisdorf	Incomplete junction: only ramps westbound
Schleswig-Holstein	Plön	Schwentinental				Schwentinental-Süd	B 202 – Lütjenburg, Oldenburg in Holstein	Eastern endpoint of concurrency with the B 202
Schleswig-Holstein	Plön	No junctions along southern Schwentinental						
Schleswig-Holstein	Plön	Preetz				Preetz-Nord	Preetz, Klein Barkau	
Schleswig-Holstein	Plön	No junctions along Preetz bypass						
Schleswig-Holstein	Plön	Plön				Plön-Hamburger Straße	B 430 – Neumünster, Hohenwestedt	Western endpoint of concurrency with the B 430 cross-level intersection
Schleswig-Holstein	Plön	Plön				Plön-Lütjenburger Straße	B 430 – Lütjenburg	Eastern endpoint of concurrency with the B 430 cross-level intersection
Schleswig-Holstein	No junctions along Eutin							
Schleswig-Holstein	Ostholstein	Süsel				Süsel	Pönitz, Neustadt in Holstein	
Schleswig-Holstein	Ostholstein	No junctions along southern Süsel						
Schleswig-Holstein	Ostholstein	Scharbeutz			15	Eutin	A 1 / E47 – Fehmarn	
Schleswig-Holstein	Ostholstein	Scharbeutz	Road interruption					
Schleswig-Holstein	Ostholstein	Scharbeutz			16	Scharbeutz	A 1 / E47 – Hamburg, Lübeck	
Schleswig-Holstein	Ostholstein	No junctions along Scharbeutz						
Schleswig-Holstein	Ostholstein	Timmendorfer Strand				Timmendorfer Strand	Timmendorfer Strand, Bad Schwartau	
Schleswig-Holstein	No junctions along eastern Timmendorfer Strand							
Schleswig-Holstein	Lübeck	Travemünde				Lübeck-Travemünde	B 75 – Lübeck, Travemünde	
1.000 mi = 1.609 km; 1.000 km = 0.621 mi: Concurrency terminus; Closed/former; Incomplete access; Proposed; Route transition

== See also ==
- List of federal roads in Germany
