= Bundesstraße 199 =

Federal highway in Germany

B 199
- Bundesstraße 199

Route information
- Length: 109.5 km (68.0 mi) SH: 86.0 km (53.4 mi); MV: 23.5 (14.6 mi)

Major junctions
- West end: Klixbüll (SH)/Klempenow (MV)
- East end: Kappeln (SH)/Anklam (MV)

Location
- Country: Germany
- States: Schleswig-Holstein; Mecklenburg-Vorpommern

Highway system
- Roads in Germany; Autobahns; List; Federal; List; State; E-roads

The Bundesstraße 199 is the name of two German federal roads or Bundesstraße. The first road runs between Klixbüll, Flensburg and Kappeln in the northern part of the state of Schleswig-Holstein. The second road runs between Klempenow and Anklam in the eastern part of Mecklenburg-Vorpommern.

== Route ==
=== Route in Schleswig-Holstein ===
The B 199 begins at the village of Klixbüll north of the town of Niebüll at the B 5. It then runs parallel to the German-Danish border through the Villages of Leck, Stadum, Schafflund and Handewitt, where it crosses the A 7 motorway until it reaches the city of Flensburg. It bypasses the city together with the B 200. After leaving Flensburg it meets the villages of Langballig, Steinbergkirche and Gelting until it ends in at an intersection with the B 201 and B 203 in the western part of Kappeln

=== Route in Mecklenburg-Vorpommern ===
The B 199 begins in the village of Klempenow. Shortly after it has a junction with the A 20 motorway. It runs straight to the city of Anklam where it meets the B 110 near the Anklam bypass.

== Major junctions ==
State	District	Location	km	mi	Exit	Name	Destinations	Notes
Road in Schleswig-Holstein
Schleswig-Holstein	Nordfriesland	Klixbüll				Klixbüll	B 5 – Husum, Niebüll, Tønder, Süderlügum	cross-level intersection
Schleswig-Holstein	No junctions along Leck, Stadum, Schafflund, Unaften and Handewitt							
Schleswig-Holstein	Schleswig-Flensburg	Handewitt				Flensburg/Harrislee	A 7 – Hamburg, Kiel, Husum, Kolding, Bundesgrenze	Husum is only signed westbound
Schleswig-Holstein	Flensburg	Friesischer Berg				Flensburg-Schäferhaus	Niebüll (parallel road), Harrislee, Pattburg, Flensburg-Weiche, Schäferhaus	Niebüll is only signed westbound
Schleswig-Holstein	Flensburg	Friesischer Berg				Flensburg-Zentrum	B 200 – Aabenraa	Western endpoint of concurrency with the B 200
Schleswig-Holstein	Flensburg	Weiche				Flensburg-Rude	Flensburg-Rude	
Schleswig-Holstein	Flensburg	Südstadt				Flensburg-Süd	B 200 – Husum, A 7	Eastern endpoint of concurrency with the B 200
Schleswig-Holstein	Flensburg	Südstadt				Flensburg-Fördepark	Flensburg-Süd, Fördepark	one-quadrant interchange
Schleswig-Holstein	No junctions along Flensburg-Ost, Wees, Munkbrarup, Langballig, Streichmühle, Steinbergkirche and Gelting							
Schleswig-Holstein	Schleswig-Flensburg	Kappeln				Kappeln	B 201 – Schleswig, Süderbrarup, A 7 B 203 – Eckernförde	cross-level intersection
Road in Mecklenburg-Vorpommern
Mecklenburg-Vorpommern	Mecklenburgische Seenplatte	Breest				Klempenow	Neubrandenburg, Altentreptow, Burow, Klempenow, Stralsund, Jarmen	cross-level intersection crossing with former B 96
Mecklenburg-Vorpommern	Mecklenburgische Seenplatte	Breest				Anklam	A 20 – Berlin, Stettin, Lübeck, Stralsund	
Mecklenburg-Vorpommern	No junctions along Iven, Wegezin, Postlow							
Mecklenburg-Vorpommern	Vorpommern-Greifswald	Anklam				Görke	B 110 – Jarmen, A 20, Anklam, Insel Usedom	cross-level intersection
1.000 mi = 1.609 km; 1.000 km = 0.621 mi: Concurrency terminus; Incomplete access; Route transition

== See also ==
- List of federal roads in Germany
