= Silberstedt (Amt) =

Amt in Schleswig-Flensburg, Schleswig-Holstein, Germany

Silberstedt was an Amt ("collective municipality") in the district of Schleswig-Flensburg, in Schleswig-Holstein, Germany. The seat of the Amt was in Silberstedt. In January 2008, it was merged with the Amt Schuby to form the Amt Arensharde.

== Municipalities ==
The Amt Silberstedt consisted of the following municipalities:

1. Bollingstedt
2. Ellingstedt
3. Hollingstedt
4. Jübek
5. Silberstedt
6. Treia
