= Bundesstraße 201 =

Federal highway in Germany

B 201
- Bundesstraße 201

Route information
- Length: 63 km (39 mi)

Major junctions
- West end: Husum
- East end: Kappeln

Location
- Country: Germany
- States: Schleswig-Holstein

Highway system
- Roads in Germany; Autobahns; List; Federal; List; State; E-roads

The Bundesstraße 201 is a German federal road or Bundesstraße and the west–east link between Husum, Schleswig and Kappeln in the northern part of the state of Schleswig-Holstein.

== Route ==
The B 201 begins at the Husum bypass of the B 5. It then runs towards Schleswig where it meets the A7 motorway and the B 76. After it bypasses the city it passes through the city of Süderbrarup until it ends in the city of Kappeln at a crossing with the B 199 and the B 203

== Major junctions ==
| State | District | Location | km | mi | Exit | Name | Destinations | Notes |
|---|---|---|---|---|---|---|---|---|
| Schleswig-Holstein | Nordfriesland | Husum | | | | Husum-Kuhsteig | B 5 – Hamburg, Niebüll | Former route in Husum cross-level intersection |
| Schleswig-Holstein | Nordfriesland | Husum | | | | Husum-Flensburger Chaussee | B 200 – Flensburg | Former route in Husum cross-level intersection |
| Schleswig-Holstein | Nordfriesland | Husum | | | | Husum-Ost | B 5 – Hamburg, Niebüll | |
| Schleswig-Holstein | No junctions along Schwesing, Wester-Ohrstedt, Oster-Ohrstedt, Treia, Silberstedt and Schuby | | | | | | | |
| Schleswig-Holstein | Schleswig-Flensburg | Schuby | | | 5 | Schleswig/Schuby | A 7 / E45 – Hamburg, Kiel, Flensburg | |
| Schleswig-Holstein | Schleswig-Flensburg | Schuby | | | | Schleswig-Nord | B 76 – Kiel, Schleswig, Flensburg | |
| Schleswig-Holstein | Schleswig-Flensburg | Schleswig | | | | Schleswig-Flensburger Straße | Idstedt, Schleswig | |
| Schleswig-Holstein | Schleswig-Flensburg | Schleswig | | | | Schleswig-Langseestraße | Missunde, Schleswig | |
| Schleswig-Holstein | Schleswig-Flensburg | No junctions along Schaalby, Grumby, Loit, Groß-Brebel, Süderbrarup and Rebenkirchen | | | | | | |
| Schleswig-Holstein | Schleswig-Flensburg | Kappeln | | | | Kappeln-Nordstraße | B 199 – Flensburg, Gelting; B 203 – Eckernförde | |
1.000 mi = 1.609 km; 1.000 km = 0.621 mi: Closed/former

== See also ==
- List of federal roads in Germany
