= Bundesstraße 200 =

Federal highway in Germany

B 200
- Bundesstraße 200

Route information
- Length: 48 km (30 mi)

Major junctions
- Northeast end: Harrislee
- Southwest end: Husum

Location
- Country: Germany
- States: Schleswig-Holstein

Highway system
- Roads in Germany; Autobahns; List; Federal; List; State; E-roads

The Bundesstraße 200 is a German federal road or Bundesstraße and the northeast–southwest link between Flensburg, Wanderup and Husum in the northern part of the state of Schleswig-Holstein.

== Route ==
The B 200 begins at the German-Danish border north of Flensburg. It then bypasses the city of Flensburg where it meets the B 199. It then reuns south west where it meets the A 7 motorway. The route continues until it meets the Husum bypass of the B 5.

== Major junctions ==
State	District	Location	km	mi	Exit	Name	Destinations	Notes
Schleswig-Holstein	Schleswig-Flensburg	Harrislee				Kupfermühle/Kruså former border crossing	Sekundærrute 170 – Aabenraa, Kolding	Border crossing is no longer operational since 2001 Northern endpoint of dual carriageway Trucks prohibited
Schleswig-Holstein	Schleswig-Flensburg	Harrislee				Wassersleben	Wassersleben	incomplete junction: no entry ramp: Wassersleben → Flensburg
Schleswig-Holstein	Schleswig-Flensburg	Harrislee			Rest area	Wassersleben	Wassersleben rest area	
Schleswig-Holstein	Flensburg	Nordstadt				Klues	Flensburg-Klues	
Schleswig-Holstein	Flensburg	Westliche Höhe				Duburg	Dänemark (Trucks), Pattburg, Harrislee, Flensburg-Duburg	Dänemark is only signed northbound
Schleswig-Holstein	Flensburg	Friesischer Berg				Flensburg-Zentrum	B 199 – Dänemark (Trucks), Niebüll, Flensburg-Zentrum	Northern Endpoint of concurrency with the B 199 Dänemark is only signed northbound
Schleswig-Holstein	Flensburg	Weiche/Südstadt				Rude	Flensburg-Rude	
Schleswig-Holstein	Flensburg	Weiche/Südstadt				Flensburg-Süd	B 199 – Kappeln, Glücksburg, Sörup, Satrup, Flensburg Süd/Ost	Southern Endpoint of concurrency with the B 199 Sörup, Satrup and Flensburg Ost are only signed northbound
Schleswig-Holstein	Schleswig-Flensburg	Handewitt				Jarplund-Weding	Kiel, Schleswig, Flensburg-Weiche, Jarplund-Weding	Kiel is only signed southbound
Schleswig-Holstein	Schleswig-Flensburg	Handewitt			3	Flensburg	A 7 / E45 – Hamburg, Kiel, Kolding, Bundesgrenze	Bundesgrenze is only signed northbound
Schleswig-Holstein	No junctions along Wanderup, Haselund and Viöl							
Schleswig-Holstein	Nordfriesland	Husum				Husum-Messe	B 5 – Hamburg, Schleswig, Niebüll, ( A 23)	
Schleswig-Holstein	Nordfriesland	Husum				Husum-Schleswiger Chaussee	B 201 – Schleswig	Former route in Husum cross-level intersection
Schleswig-Holstein	Nordfriesland	Husum				Husum-Kuhsteig	B 5 – Hamburg, Niebüll	Former route in Husum cross-level intersection
1.000 mi = 1.609 km; 1.000 km = 0.621 mi: Concurrency terminus; Closed/former; Incomplete access; Route transition

== See also ==
- List of federal roads in Germany
