= Schuby (Amt) =

Former government-office in Schleswig-Holstein, Germany

Coordinates: 54.517°N 9.483°E

Schuby was an Amt ("collective municipality") in the district of Schleswig-Flensburg, in Schleswig-Holstein, Germany. The seat of the Amt was in Schuby. In January 2008, it was merged with the Amt Silberstedt to form the Amt Arensharde.

== Municipalities ==
The Amt Schuby consisted of the following municipalities:

1. Hüsby
2. Lürschau
3. Schuby
