= Handewitt (Amt) =

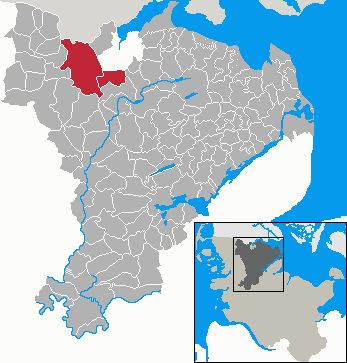
Handewitt

Handewitt was an Amt ("collective municipality") in the district of Schleswig-Flensburg, in Schleswig-Holstein, Germany. The seat of the Amt was the former municipality Handewitt. In March 2008, the Amt was disbanded and the two municipalities merged into the town of Handewitt.

The Amt Handewitt consists of the following municipalities:

1. Handewitt
2. Jarplund-Weding
