= Osdorf, Schleswig-Holstein =

Osdorf
- Municipality
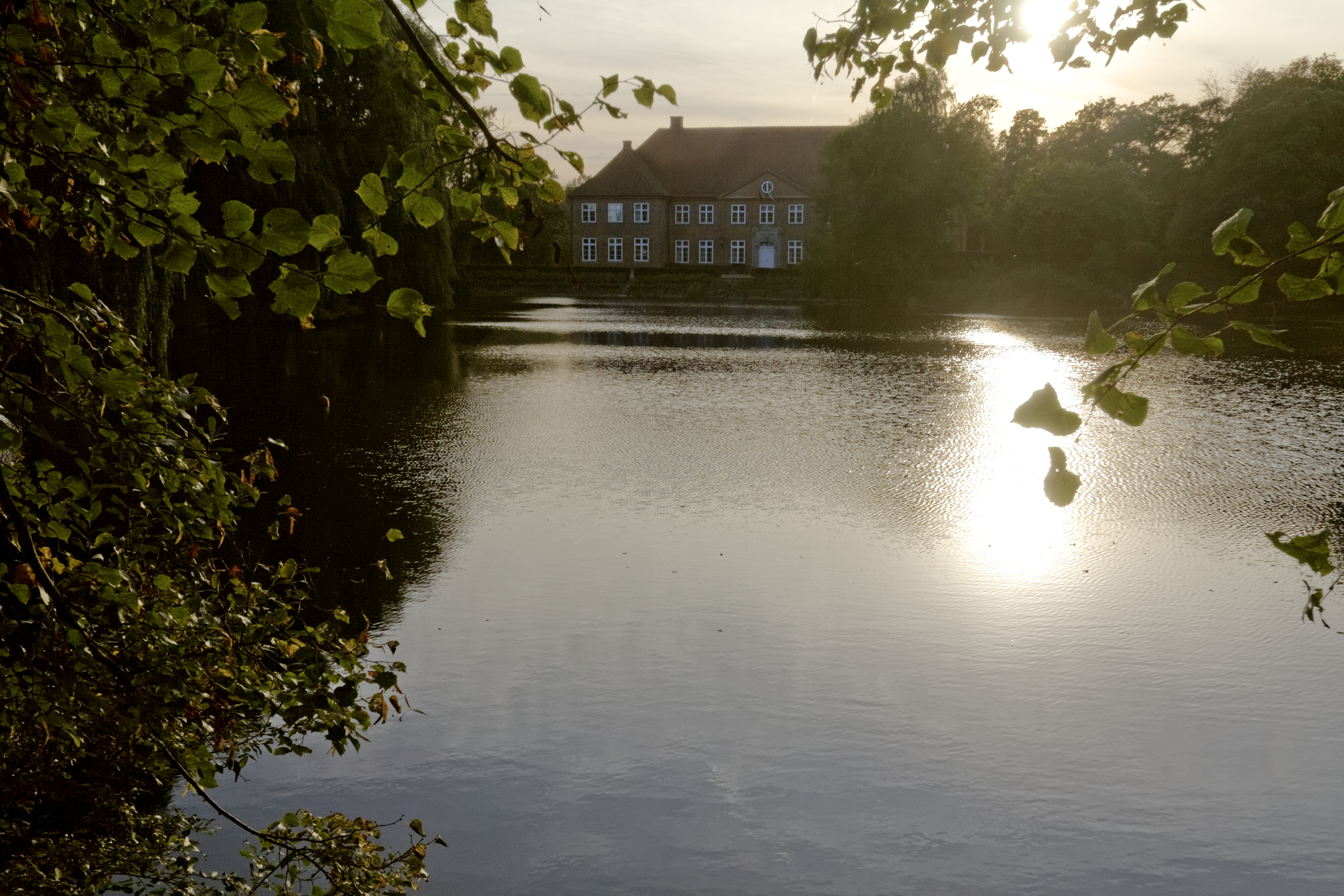
- Gut Borghorst

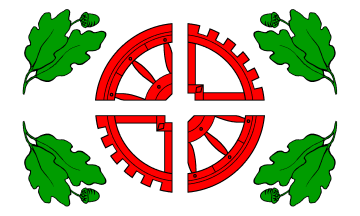
- Flag Coat of arms

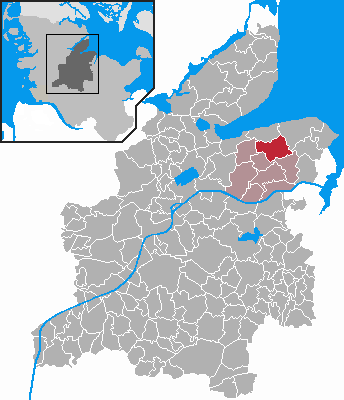
- Location of Osdorf within Rendsburg-Eckernförde district
- Interactive map of Osdorf
- Location within Germany Location within Schleswig-Holstein
- Coordinates: 54°26′N 10°1′E
- Country: Germany
- State: Schleswig-Holstein
- District: Rendsburg-Eckernförde
- Municipal assoc.: Dänischer Wohld

Government
  - Mayor: Helge Kohrt (SPD)

Area
  - Total: 19.87 km^{2} (7.67 sq mi)
- Elevation: 19 m (62 ft)

Population (2025-12-31)
  - Total: 2,604
  - Density: 131.1/km^{2} (339.4/sq mi)
- Time zone: UTC+01:00 (CET)
  - Summer (DST): UTC+02:00 (CEST)
- Postal codes: 24251
- Dialling codes: 04346
- Vehicle registration: RD
- Website: osdorf.de

Osdorf (German pronunciation: [ˈɔsdɔrf]) is a municipality in the district of Rendsburg-Eckernförde, in Schleswig-Holstein, Germany.

The location of Osdorf is south of the municipality of Noer, but north of Gettorf and Felm, and west of Schwedeneck.
