= Peter Mathiesen =

Danish clockmaker

Peter Mathiesen (1696–1768) was a Copenhagen-based Danish clockmaker. He was a co-founder of the city's Clockmakers' Guild in 1755 and served as the guild's third alderman in 1758–60. His workshop was located on Vimmelskaftet.

== Biography ==
Mathiesen was born in 1696 in Dollerup, Grumtoft Parish, Schleswig-Holstein. It is not known where he was trained as a clockmaker but Gottorp was an important centre for artists and artisans at the time. He worked for clockmaker Christian Christensen in Hillerød in 1724. He was later by the crown charged with maintaining two large clockworks at the royal palaces. On 15 December 1724, he was accepted into the Smiths' Guild without having submitted a masterpiece.

Mathiesen established his own workshop on Vimmelskaftet. It developed into one of the largest of its kind in the country. In 1729–54, it employed 18 trained clockmakers and some 30 apprentices. In 1755, Mathiesen was a co-founder of the Clockmakers' Guild in Copenhagen. He served as the guild's third alderman in 1758–60. He specialized in tower clocks and longcase clocks.

== Notable works ==
Buildings with Peter Mathiesen tower clocks include the Church of Holmen in Copenhagen (1737), Frederiksberg Church in Frederiksberg (1739), St.Nicolas' Church in Åbenrå, St. Nicolas' Church in Holbæk and Roskilde Cathedral in Roskilde (1741) He also made a donation of a clock for Grundhof Church in his home town.

The Karen Blixen museum at Rungstedlund contains a Peter Mathiesen longcase clock.
