= Dollerup =

- Municipality
- Coat of arms

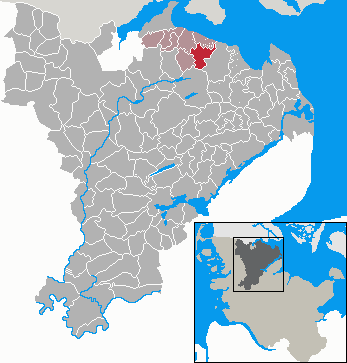
- Location of Dollerup within Schleswig-Flensburg district
- Interactive map of Dollerup
- Location within Germany Location within Schleswig-Holstein
- Coordinates: 54°46′N 9°40′E
- Country: Germany
- State: Schleswig-Holstein
- District: Schleswig-Flensburg
- Municipal assoc.: Langballig

Government
  - Mayor: Peter-Wilhelm Jacobsen

Area
  - Total: 13.08 km^{2} (5.05 sq mi)
- Elevation: 35 m (115 ft)

Population (2025-12-31)
  - Total: 1,084
  - Density: 82.87/km^{2} (214.6/sq mi)
- Time zone: UTC+01:00 (CET)
  - Summer (DST): UTC+02:00 (CEST)
- Postal codes: 24989
- Dialling codes: 04636
- Vehicle registration: SL
- Website: www.langballig.de

Dollerup is a municipality in the district of Schleswig-Flensburg, in Schleswig-Holstein, Germany. It lies 351 kilometres (218 mi) from Berlin, the country's capital.

== Notable people ==
- Peter Mathiesen (1696–1768)
