= Dänischer Wohld (Amt) =

- Amt
- Flag Coat of arms

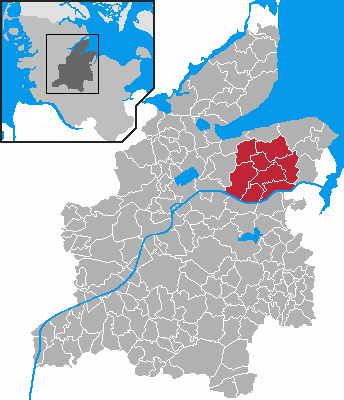
- Map of Rendsburg-Eckernförde highlighting Dänischer Wohld
- Interactive map of Dänischer Wohld
- Location within Germany Location within Schleswig-Holstein
- Coordinates: 54°24′N 9°59′E
- Country: Germany
- State: Schleswig-Holstein
- District: Rendsburg-Eckernförde
- Seat: Gettorf
- Subdivisions: 8 municipalities

Government
  - Mayor: Jens Krabbenhöft (CDU)

Area
  - Total: 124.97 km^{2} (48.25 sq mi)

Population (2025-12-31)
  - Total: 17,406
  - Density: 139.28/km^{2} (360.74/sq mi)
- Time zone: UTC+01:00 (CET)
  - Summer (DST): UTC+02:00 (CEST)
- Website: www.amt-daenischer-wohld.de

Amt Dänischer Wohld is an Amt ("collective municipality") in the district of Rendsburg-Eckernförde, in Schleswig-Holstein, Germany. It is situated between Eckernförde and Kiel, around the village Gettorf, which is the seat of the Amt. It is named after the Dänischer Wohld peninsula, of which the Amt only encompasses a central part.

The Amt Dänischer Wohld consists of the following municipalities:

1. Felm
2. Gettorf
3. Lindau
4. Neudorf-Bornstein
5. Neuwittenbek
6. Osdorf
7. Schinkel
8. Tüttendorf
