= Westerholz =

Westerholz Vesterskov
- Municipality
- Coat of arms

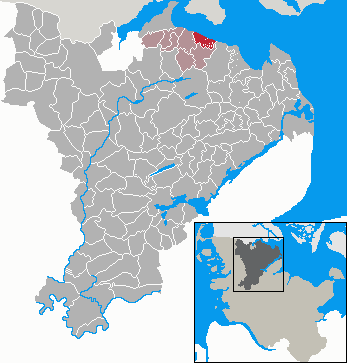
- Location of Westerholz; Vesterskov within Schleswig-Flensburg district
- Interactive map of Westerholz; Vesterskov
- Location within Germany Location within Schleswig-Holstein
- Coordinates: 54°49′N 9°40′E
- Country: Germany
- State: Schleswig-Holstein
- District: Schleswig-Flensburg
- Municipal assoc.: Langballig

Government
  - Mayor: Bern Ertzinger

Area
  - Total: 14.74 km^{2} (5.69 sq mi)
- Elevation: 13 m (43 ft)

Population (2025-12-31)
  - Total: 743
  - Density: 50.4/km^{2} (131/sq mi)
- Time zone: UTC+01:00 (CET)
  - Summer (DST): UTC+02:00 (CEST)
- Postal codes: 24977
- Dialling codes: 04636
- Vehicle registration: SL
- Website: www.langballig.de

Westerholz (Danish: Vesterskov) is a municipality in the district of Schleswig-Flensburg, in Schleswig-Holstein, Germany.
