= Ringsberg =

Ringsberg Ringsbjerg
- Municipality
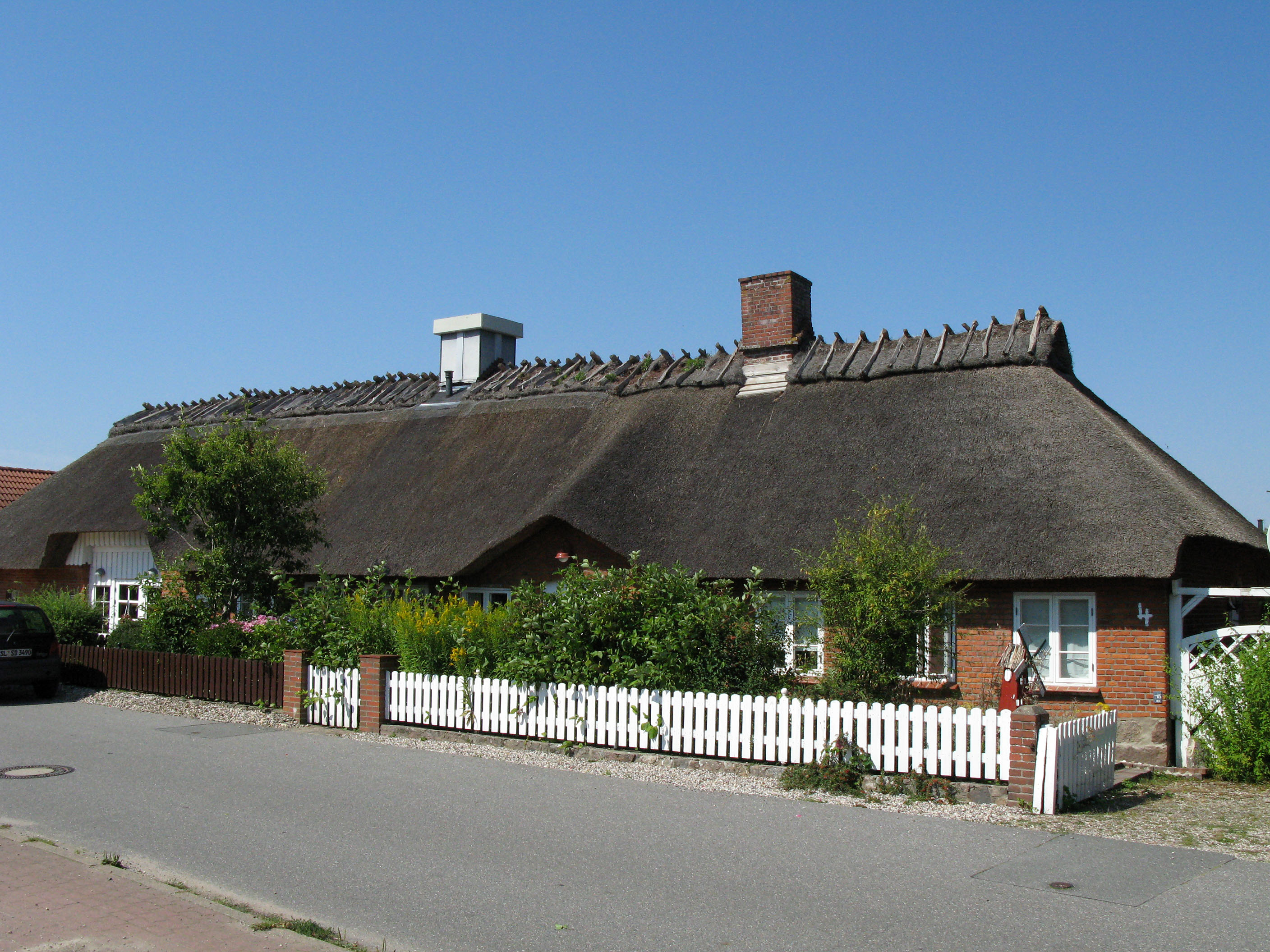

- Coat of arms

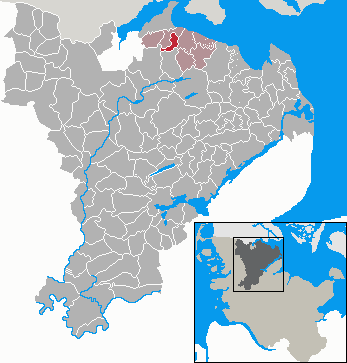
- Location of Ringsberg within Schleswig-Flensburg district
- Interactive map of Ringsberg
- Location within Germany Location within Schleswig-Holstein
- Coordinates: 54°49′N 9°35′E
- Country: Germany
- State: Schleswig-Holstein
- District: Schleswig-Flensburg
- Municipal assoc.: Langballig

Government
  - Mayor: Hans Detlef Jordt

Area
  - Total: 5.26 km^{2} (2.03 sq mi)
- Elevation: 37 m (121 ft)

Population (2025-12-31)
  - Total: 542
  - Density: 103/km^{2} (267/sq mi)
- Time zone: UTC+01:00 (CET)
  - Summer (DST): UTC+02:00 (CEST)
- Postal codes: 24977
- Dialling codes: 04634, 04636
- Vehicle registration: SL
- Website: www.ringsberg.info

Ringsberg (Danish: Ringsbjerg) is a municipality in the district of Schleswig-Flensburg, in Schleswig-Holstein, Germany.
