= Arensharde =

- Amt
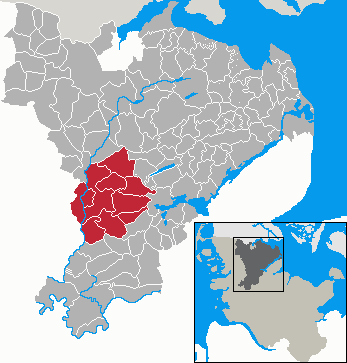
- Map of Schleswig-Flensburg highlighting Arensharde
- Interactive map of Arensharde
- Location within Germany Location within Schleswig-Holstein
- Coordinates: 54°31′N 9°22′E
- Country: Germany
- State: Schleswig-Holstein
- District: Schleswig-Flensburg
- Seat: Silberstedt
- Subdivisions: 9 municipalities

Area
  - Total: 191.39 km^{2} (73.90 sq mi)

Population (2025-12-31)
  - Total: 14,819
  - Density: 77.428/km^{2} (200.54/sq mi)
- Time zone: UTC+01:00 (CET)
  - Summer (DST): UTC+02:00 (CEST)
- Vehicle registration: SL
- Website: www.amt-arensharde.de

Arensharde (Danish: Arns Herred) is an Amt ("collective municipality") in the district of Schleswig-Flensburg, in Schleswig-Holstein, Germany. Its seat is in Silberstedt. It was formed on 1 January 2008 from the former Ämter Schuby and Silberstedt.

The Amt Arensharde consists of the following municipalities:

1. Bollingstedt
2. Ellingstedt
3. Hollingstedt
4. Hüsby
5. Jübek
6. Lürschau
7. Schuby
8. Silberstedt
9. Treia
