= Klempenow Castle =

Castle in Breest municipality, Germany

- Burg Klempenow
- Breest, Mecklenburg-Vorpommern
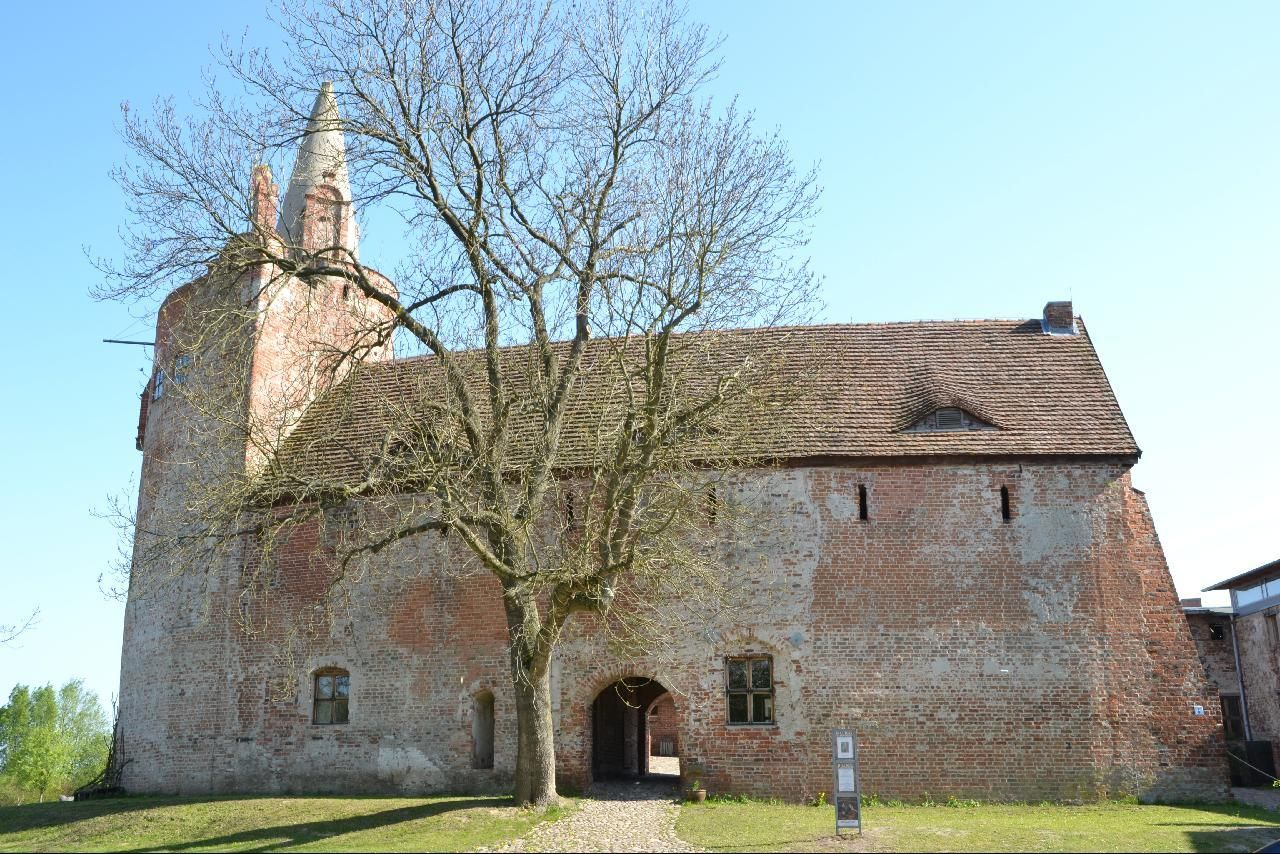
- Klempenow Castle

Site information
- Type: Castle

Location
- Location within Mecklenburg-Vorpommern Location within Germany
- Coordinates: 53°47′26″N 13°18′40″E

Site history
- Built: 13th century

Klempenow Castle (German: Burg Klempenow) is a castle in Breest municipality, Germany.

The castle was built during the time of German settlement in Pomerania in the 13th century and formed part of a series of fortifications on the border with Mecklenburg. The original castle consisted of two towers and a three-metre thick defensive wall. It has been substantially altered since its initial construction. During the 17th century, it acquired more or less its present shape and appearance. When Pomerania was ruled by Sweden, the castle was given as a fief to Dodo zu Innhausen und Knyphausen by the Swedish king. From 1762, it belonged to the Swedish Crown. It has since housed several different residents; after World War II, it housed refugees expelled from former German lands and at one time as many as fourteen families lived in the castle. After 1990, a renovation of the castle was carried out.

== See also ==
- Cappenberg Castle
