= Lindau, Schleswig-Holstein =

Lindau
- Municipality
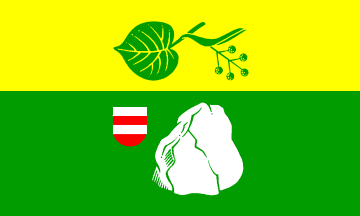
- Flag Coat of arms

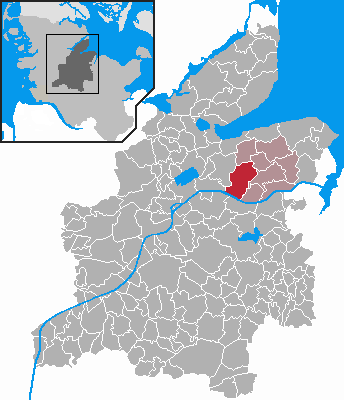
- Location of Lindau within Rendsburg-Eckernförde district
- Interactive map of Lindau
- Location within Germany Location within Schleswig-Holstein
- Coordinates: 54°22′N 9°54′E
- Country: Germany
- State: Schleswig-Holstein
- District: Rendsburg-Eckernförde
- Municipal assoc.: Dänischer Wohld

Government
  - Mayor: Jens Krabbenhöft (CDU)

Area
  - Total: 25.18 km^{2} (9.72 sq mi)
- Elevation: 13 m (43 ft)

Population (2025-12-31)
  - Total: 1,402
  - Density: 55.68/km^{2} (144.2/sq mi)
- Time zone: UTC+01:00 (CET)
  - Summer (DST): UTC+02:00 (CEST)
- Postal codes: 24214
- Dialling codes: 04346
- Vehicle registration: RD
- Website: www.amt-daenischer- wohld.de

Lindau (German pronunciation: [ˈlɪndaʊ]) is a municipality in the district of Rendsburg-Eckernförde, in Schleswig-Holstein, Germany.
