= Schinkel, Schleswig-Holstein =

Schinkel
- Municipality
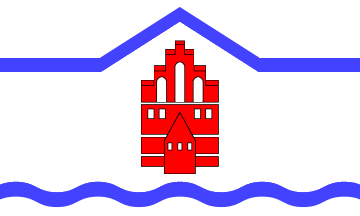
- Flag Coat of arms

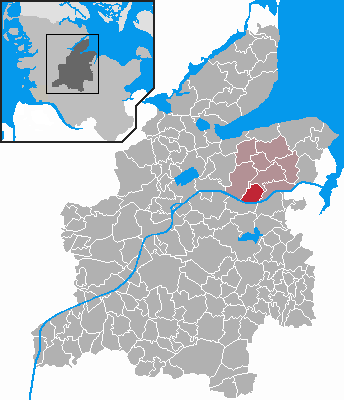
- Location of Schinkel within Rendsburg-Eckernförde district
- Interactive map of Schinkel
- Location within Germany Location within Schleswig-Holstein
- Coordinates: 54°22′N 9°56′E
- Country: Germany
- State: Schleswig-Holstein
- District: Rendsburg-Eckernförde
- Municipal assoc.: Dänischer Wohld

Government
  - Mayor: Hans-Georg Güttler

Area
  - Total: 10.21 km^{2} (3.94 sq mi)
- Elevation: 17 m (56 ft)

Population (2025-12-31)
  - Total: 1,060
  - Density: 104/km^{2} (269/sq mi)
- Time zone: UTC+01:00 (CET)
  - Summer (DST): UTC+02:00 (CEST)
- Postal codes: 24214
- Dialling codes: 04346
- Vehicle registration: RD
- Website: www.amt-daenischer- wohld.de

Schinkel (German pronunciation: [ˈʃɪŋkl̩]) is a municipality in the district of Rendsburg-Eckernförde, in Schleswig-Holstein, Germany.
