= Langballig (Amt) =

Municipality in Schleswig-Holstein, Germany

- Amt
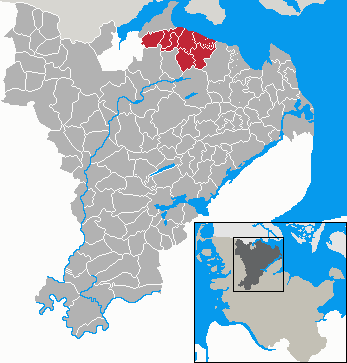
- Map of Schleswig-Flensburg highlighting Langballig
- Interactive map of Langballig
- Location within Germany Location within Schleswig-Holstein
- Coordinates: 54°48′N 9°38′E
- Country: Germany
- State: Schleswig-Holstein
- District: Schleswig-Flensburg
- Seat: Langballig
- Subdivisions: 7 municipalities

Area
  - Total: 86.03 km^{2} (33.22 sq mi)

Population (2025-12-31)
  - Total: 8,486
  - Density: 98.64/km^{2} (255.5/sq mi)
- Time zone: UTC+01:00 (CET)
  - Summer (DST): UTC+02:00 (CEST)
- Vehicle registration: SL
- Website: www.langballig.de

Langballig is an Amt ("collective municipality") in the district of Schleswig-Flensburg, in Schleswig-Holstein, Germany. The seat of the Amt is in Langballig. The Amt was created in 1970 by the merger of the former Ämter Grundhof and Munkbrarup.

== Municipalities ==
The Amt Langballig consists of the following municipalities:

1. Dollerup
2. Grundhof
3. Langballig
4. Munkbrarup
5. Ringsberg
6. Wees
7. Westerholz
