= Neudorf-Bornstein =

- Municipality
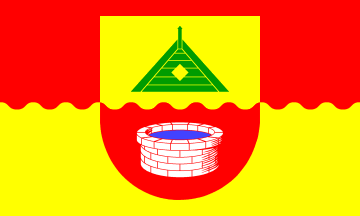
- Flag Coat of arms

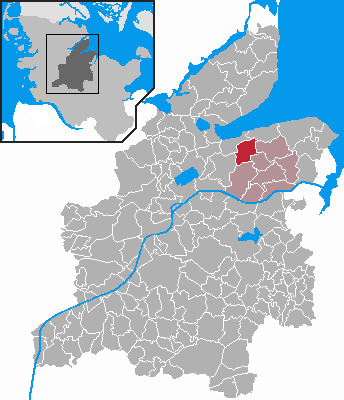
- Location of Neudorf-Bornstein within Rendsburg-Eckernförde district
- Interactive map of Neudorf-Bornstein
- Location within Germany Location within Schleswig-Holstein
- Coordinates: 54°25′N 9°56′E
- Country: Germany
- State: Schleswig-Holstein
- District: Rendsburg-Eckernförde
- Municipal assoc.: Dänischer Wohld

Government
  - Mayor: Birgit Hackmann (SPD)

Area
  - Total: 14.17 km^{2} (5.47 sq mi)
- Elevation: 21 m (69 ft)

Population (2025-12-31)
  - Total: 1,106
  - Density: 78.05/km^{2} (202.2/sq mi)
- Time zone: UTC+01:00 (CET)
  - Summer (DST): UTC+02:00 (CEST)
- Postal codes: 24214
- Dialling codes: 04346
- Vehicle registration: RD
- Website: www.amt-daenischer- wohld.de

Neudorf-Bornstein is a municipality in the district of Rendsburg-Eckernförde, in Schleswig-Holstein, Germany.
