= Bollingstedt =

Bollingstedt Bollingsted
- Municipality
- Coat of arms

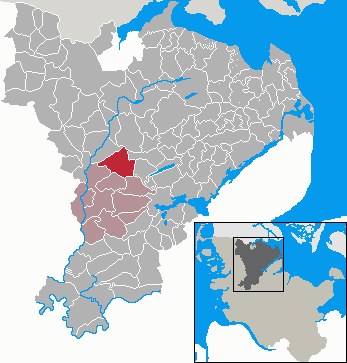
- Location of Bollingstedt; Bollingsted within Schleswig-Flensburg district
- Interactive map of Bollingstedt; Bollingsted
- Location within Germany Location within Schleswig-Holstein
- Coordinates: 54°36′N 9°25′E
- Country: Germany
- State: Schleswig-Holstein
- District: Schleswig-Flensburg
- Municipal assoc.: Arensharde

Government
  - Mayor: Bernd Nissen

Area
  - Total: 27.05 km^{2} (10.44 sq mi)
- Elevation: 17 m (56 ft)

Population (2025-12-31)
  - Total: 1,469
  - Density: 54.31/km^{2} (140.7/sq mi)
- Time zone: UTC+01:00 (CET)
  - Summer (DST): UTC+02:00 (CEST)
- Postal codes: 24855
- Dialling codes: 04625
- Vehicle registration: SL
- Website: www.amt- silberstedt.de

Bollingstedt (Danish: Bollingsted) is a municipality in the district of Schleswig-Flensburg, in Schleswig-Holstein, Germany. Bollingstedt, situated approximately 30 kilometers south of Schleswig, is a community in the district of Schleswig-Flensburg in Schleswig-Holstein, Germany. The earliest records of Bollingstedt trace back to the Middle Ages. As of 2022, it has an estimated population of around 900. While it may not boast a history in the film industry like Bendestorf, Bollingstedt is known for its serene natural landscapes and a tranquil village atmosphere, providing a stark contrast to the bustling city life.

== Geography ==
In the municipality there are several lakes such as Mølledammen (Mühlenteich), Gammellund Lake (Gammellunder See) south of Gammellund and Engbro Lake (Engbrücksee) northeast of Engbro. Gammelund Sø borders the neighboring municipality of Jydbæk in the south . East of Engbrosøen runs the A7 (E45) motorway, which connects Schleswig and Flensburg and continues north of the Danish-German border as the Sønderjyske Motorvej . North of Bollingsted lies Bollingsted Mose, in the northeast Hjalm Mose, in the east Bøgmose, in the south Stenholt Skov and in the west Byskov . The border to Sølvested - Esperstoft is marked through the small Skelbæk (Ty. Schelbek), a tributary of Bollingsted Å.

== History ==
The town of Bollingsted is first mentioned in 1196 (Dipl. dan. 1, 3, 216). In Jutland, the village is pronounced Bollengstej (Angelmål) or Bollengste (Fjoldemål). The place name is attributed to the male name Boling (col. Bolungarvik in Iceland), which seems to come from Old Norse bolungr (≈tree stack) or the name is attributed to the male name Balding, which seems to come from Old Saxon bald (≈handsome, brave). Gammelund is first mentioned in 1305, combined with gammel and lund. Engbro (≈bro ved en eng) was first mentioned in 1648 and was named after a bridge at Bollingsted Å.

The current municipality was formed in 1976 by merging the municipalities of Bollingsted and Gammelund. In addition to the towns of Bollingsted and Gammelund, the municipality includes the settlements Bollingstedlund (German Bollingstedtlund), Bøgholt (Beekholt), Engbro (Engbrück), part of Gøreså/Køså (Görrisau, the western part under Sølvested), Søndermark (Süderfeld) and Vesterskov (Westerschau).
