= Wees, Schleswig-Holstein =

Wees Ves
- Municipality
- Coat of arms

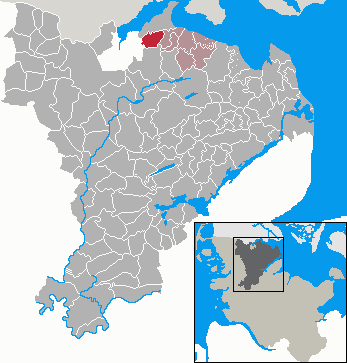
- Location of Wees; Ves within Schleswig-Flensburg district
- Interactive map of Wees; Ves
- Location within Germany Location within Schleswig-Holstein
- Coordinates: 54°49′N 9°31′E
- Country: Germany
- State: Schleswig-Holstein
- District: Schleswig-Flensburg
- Municipal assoc.: Langballig

Government
  - Mayor: Gerd Voß

Area
  - Total: 12.74 km^{2} (4.92 sq mi)
- Elevation: 37 m (121 ft)

Population (2025-12-31)
  - Total: 2,399
  - Density: 188.3/km^{2} (487.7/sq mi)
- Time zone: UTC+01:00 (CET)
  - Summer (DST): UTC+02:00 (CEST)
- Postal codes: 24999
- Dialling codes: 04631
- Vehicle registration: SL
- Website: www.wees.de

Wees (German pronunciation: [veːs]; Danish: Ves) is a municipality in the district of Schleswig-Flensburg, in Schleswig-Holstein, Germany.
