= Treia, Germany =

Treia Treja
- Municipality
- Coat of arms

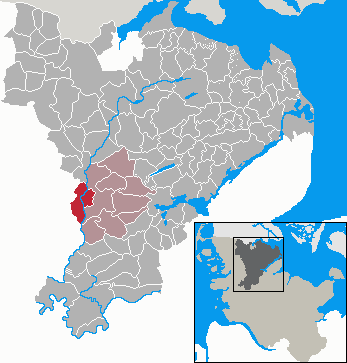
- Location of Treia; Treja within Schleswig-Flensburg district
- Interactive map of Treia; Treja
- Location within Germany Location within Schleswig-Holstein
- Coordinates: 54°30′N 9°19′E
- Country: Germany
- State: Schleswig-Holstein
- District: Schleswig-Flensburg
- Municipal assoc.: Arensharde

Government
  - Mayor: Carsten Görrissen

Area
  - Total: 21.73 km^{2} (8.39 sq mi)
- Elevation: 5 m (16 ft)

Population (2025-12-31)
  - Total: 1,610
  - Density: 74.1/km^{2} (192/sq mi)
- Time zone: UTC+01:00 (CET)
  - Summer (DST): UTC+02:00 (CEST)
- Postal codes: 24896
- Dialling codes: 04626
- Vehicle registration: SL
- Website: www.amt- silberstedt.de

Treia (Danish: Treja) is a municipality in the district of Schleswig-Flensburg, in Schleswig-Holstein, Germany.
