= Jarplund-Weding =

- Former municipality
- Location in Schleswig-Holstein / Germany Jarplund-Weding (Germany)
- Coordinates: 54°44′N 9°26′E
- Country: Germany
- State: Schleswig-Holstein
- District: Schleswig-Flensburg
- Municipality: Handewitt
- Dissolved: 1 March 2008

Area
  - Total: 13.22 km^{2} (5.10 sq mi)

Population (2006)
  - Total: ~4,300
- Time zone: UTC+1 (CET)
  - Summer (DST): UTC+2 (CEST)
- Postal code: 24941
- Area code: 0461

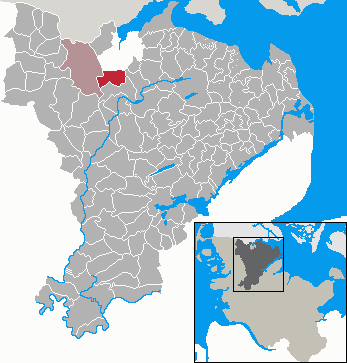
Jarplund-Weding

Jarplund-Weding (Danish: Jaruplund-Vedding) is a former municipality in the district of Schleswig-Flensburg, in Schleswig-Holstein, Germany. On March 1, 2008, the municipality was incorporated into the municipality Handewitt.

Jaruplund Højskole is located in the town.
