= Breest =

Village in northeastern Germany

- Ortsteil of Bartow
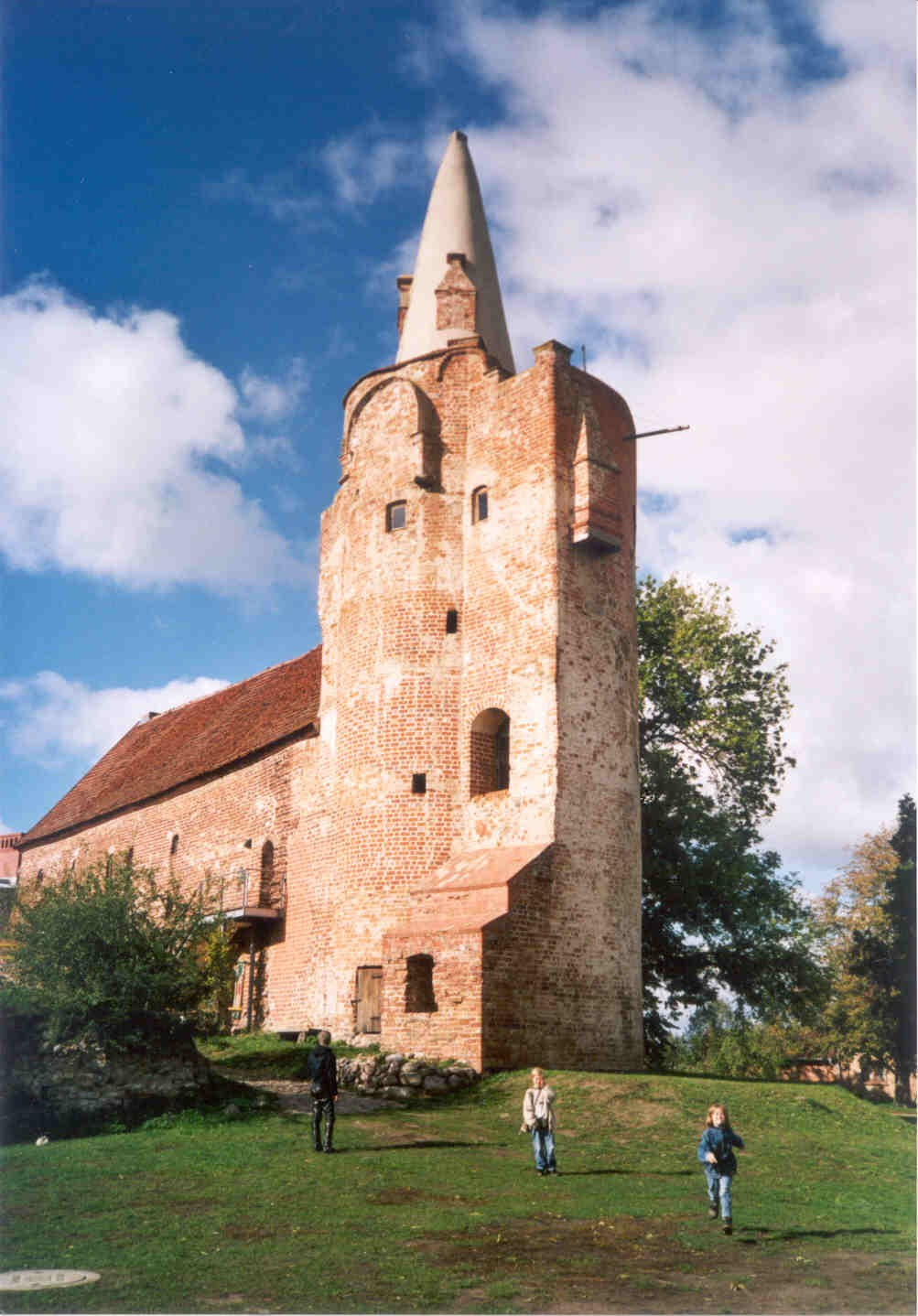
- Klempenow Castle
- Interactive map of Breest
- Location within Germany Location within Mecklenburg-Vorpommern
- Coordinates: 53°47′N 13°20′E
- Country: Germany
- State: Mecklenburg-Vorpommern
- District: Mecklenburgische Seenplatte
- Municipality: Bartow

Area
  - Total: 9.48 km^{2} (3.66 sq mi)
- Elevation: 19 m (62 ft)

Population (2023-12-31)
  - Total: 121
  - Density: 12.8/km^{2} (33.1/sq mi)
- Time zone: UTC+01:00 (CET)
  - Summer (DST): UTC+02:00 (CEST)
- Postal codes: 17089
- Dialling codes: 03965
- Vehicle registration: DM

Breest (German pronunciation: [bʁeːst]) is a village and a former municipality in the Mecklenburgische Seenplatte district, in Mecklenburg-Vorpommern, Germany. The municipality comprised the villages Bittersberg, Breest and Klempenow. Since 9 June 2024, it is part of the municipality Bartow. The 13th century Klempenow Castle is located in the municipality.
