= Lürschau =

Lürschau Lyrskov
- Municipality
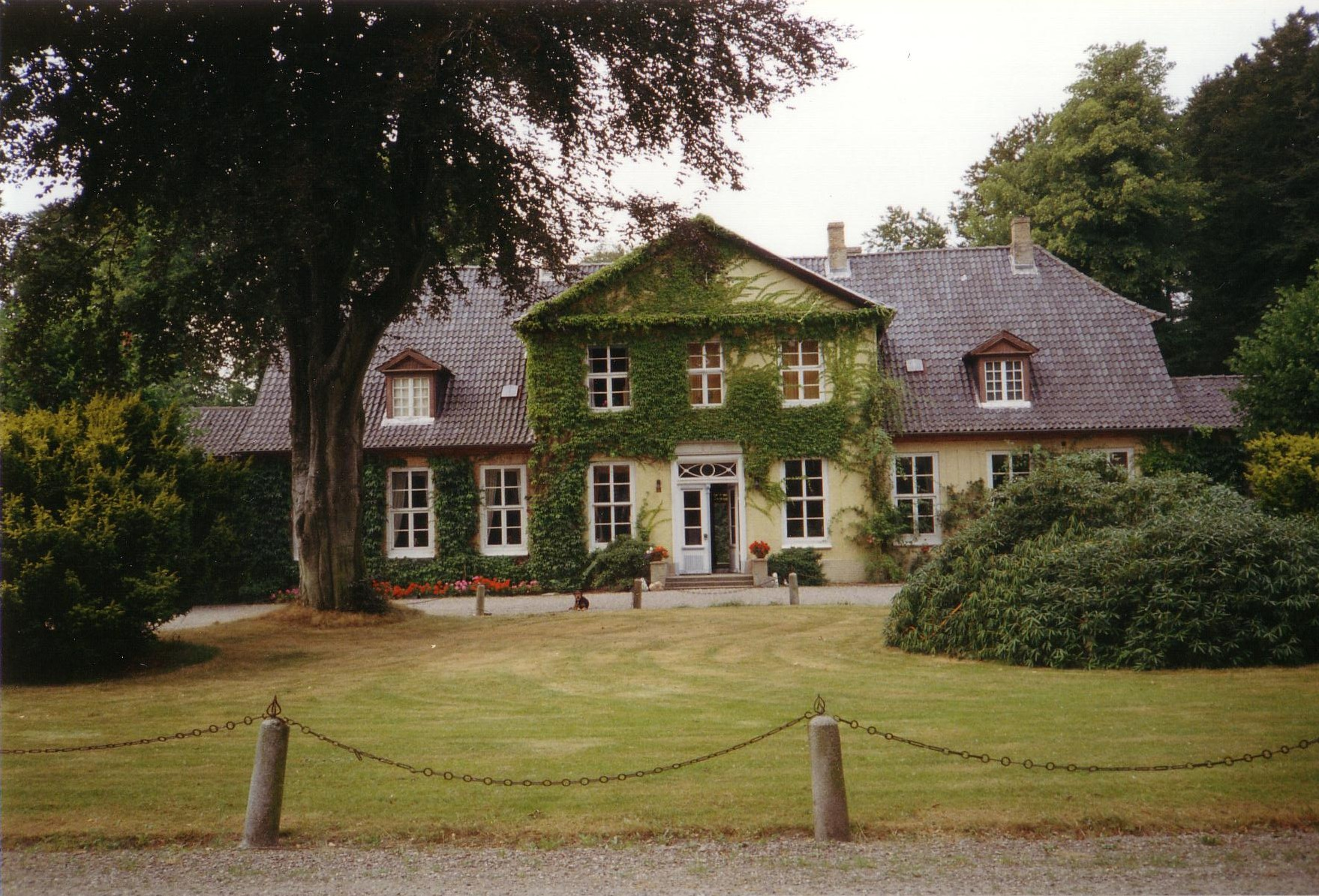
- Gut Falkenberg in Lürschau

- Coat of arms

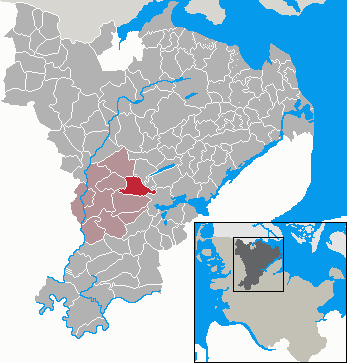
- Location of Lürschau; Lyrskov within Schleswig-Flensburg district
- Interactive map of Lürschau; Lyrskov
- Location within Germany Location within Schleswig-Holstein
- Coordinates: 54°32′20″N 9°29′47″E
- Country: Germany
- State: Schleswig-Holstein
- District: Schleswig-Flensburg
- Municipal assoc.: Arensharde

Government
  - Mayor: Uwe Gerdes

Area
  - Total: 16.51 km^{2} (6.37 sq mi)
- Elevation: 33 m (108 ft)

Population (2025-12-31)
  - Total: 1,094
  - Density: 66.26/km^{2} (171.6/sq mi)
- Time zone: UTC+01:00 (CET)
  - Summer (DST): UTC+02:00 (CEST)
- Postal codes: 24850
- Dialling codes: 04621 u. 04625
- Vehicle registration: SL
- Website: www.amt- silberstedt.de

Lürschau (Danish: Lyrskov) is a municipality in the district of Schleswig-Flensburg, in Schleswig-Holstein, Germany.

In 1043 a heath at Lürschau was the site of a battle between a Danish-Norwegian army under king Magnus the Good and a Wendish army returning from looting in Jutland. The Wends were defeated with heavy loss of life.
