= Klixbüll =

Klixbüll Klægsbøl / Klasbel
- Municipality
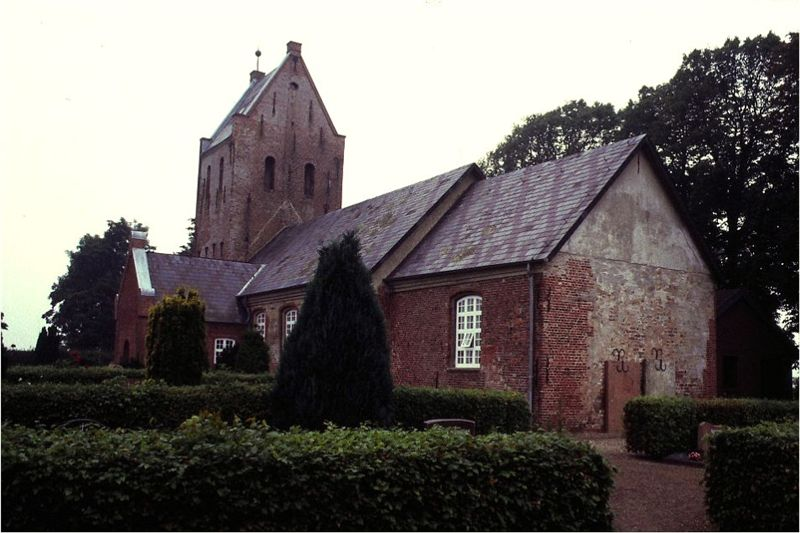
- The church of Klixbüll

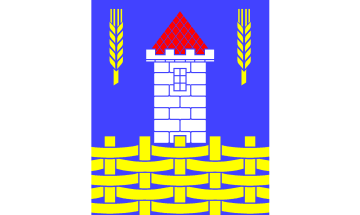
- Flag Coat of arms

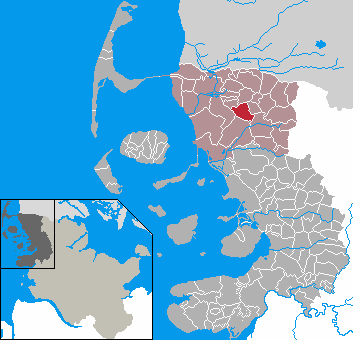
- Location of Klixbüll; Klægsbøl / Klasbel within Nordfriesland district
- Interactive map of Klixbüll; Klægsbøl / Klasbel
- Location within Germany Location within Schleswig-Holstein
- Coordinates: 54°47′N 8°54′E
- Country: Germany
- State: Schleswig-Holstein
- District: Nordfriesland
- Municipal assoc.: Südtondern

Government
  - Mayor: Ernst Wilhelm Petersen

Area
  - Total: 17.44 km^{2} (6.73 sq mi)
- Elevation: 4 m (13 ft)

Population (2025-12-31)
  - Total: 1,046
  - Density: 59.98/km^{2} (155.3/sq mi)
- Time zone: UTC+01:00 (CET)
  - Summer (DST): UTC+02:00 (CEST)
- Postal codes: 25899
- Dialling codes: 04661, 04662
- Vehicle registration: NF
- Website: www.klixbuell.de

Klixbüll (Danish: Klægsbøl, North Frisian Klasbel) is a municipality in the district of Nordfriesland, in Schleswig-Holstein, Germany.
