= Gettorf =

- Municipality
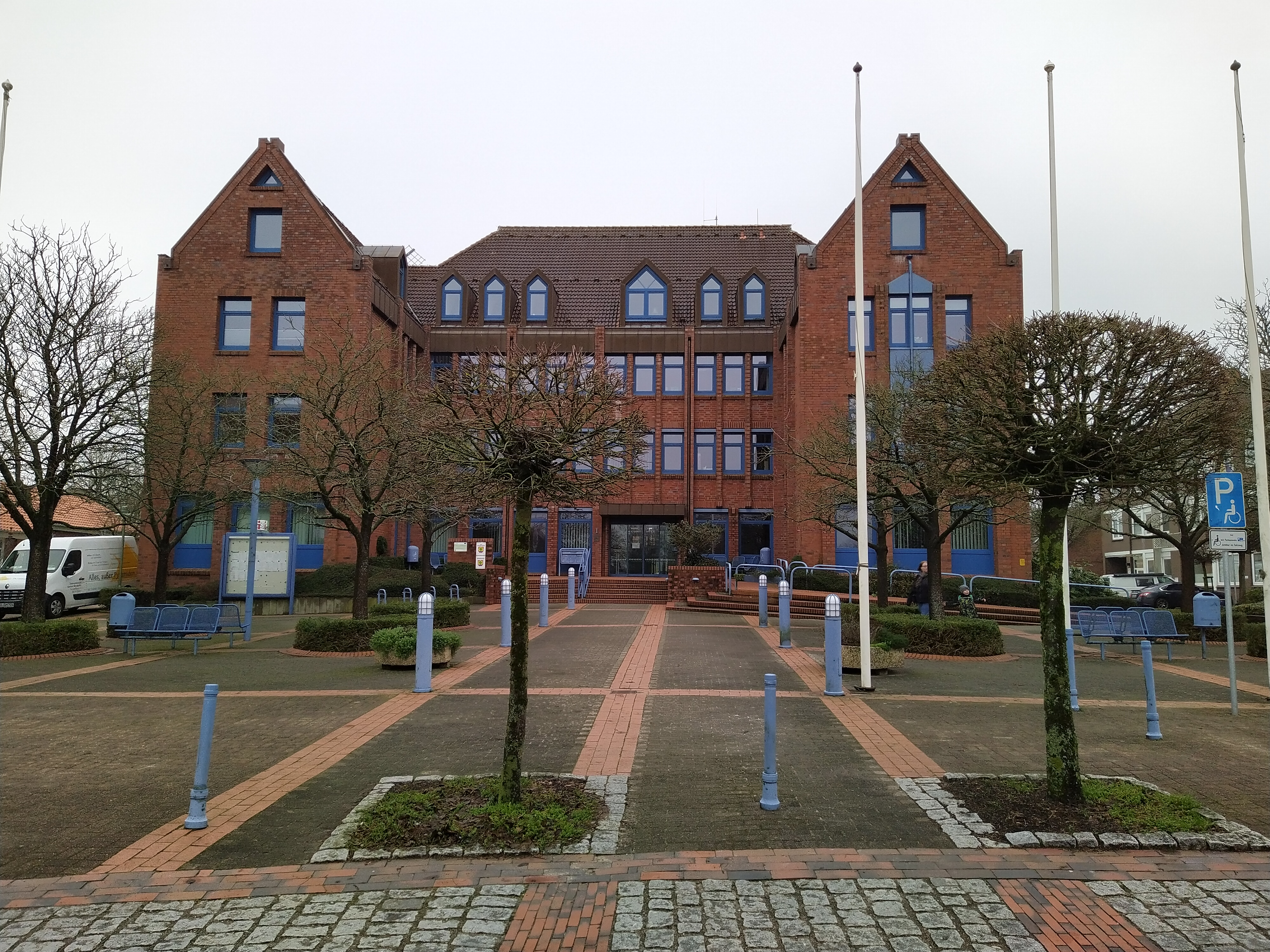

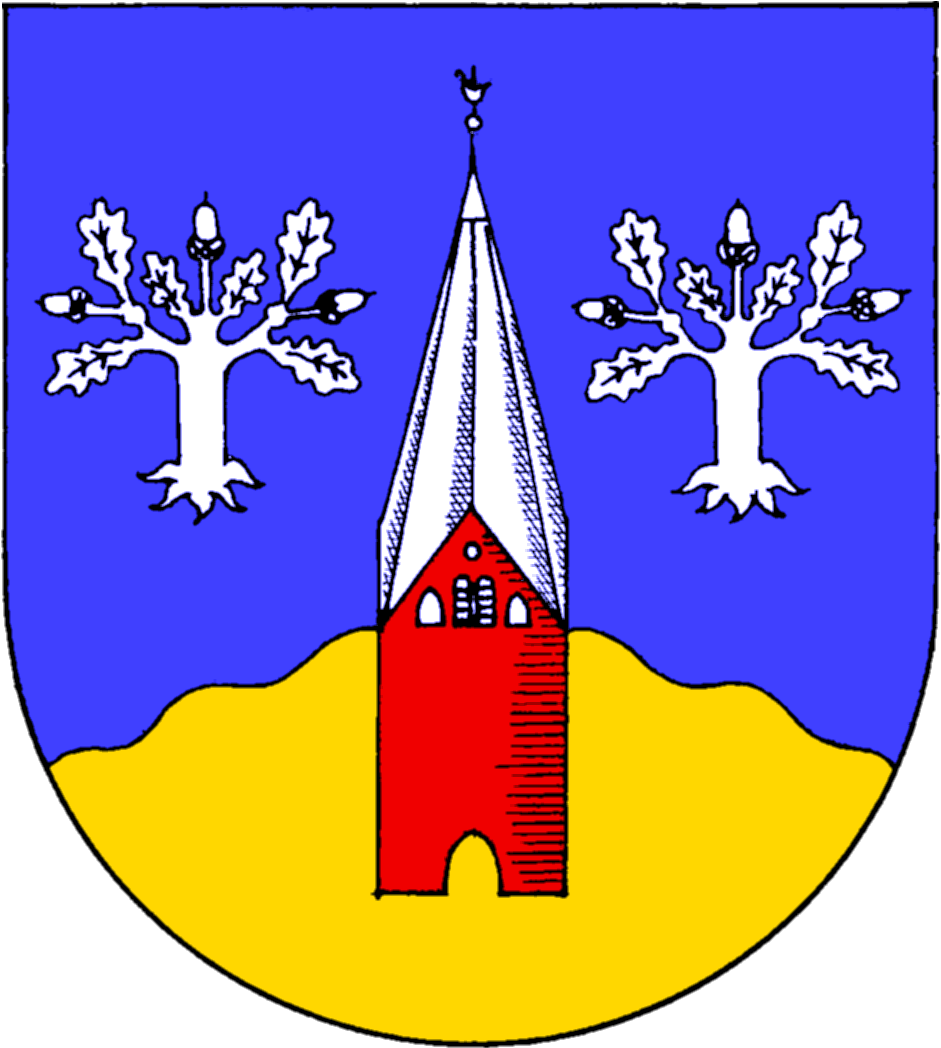
- Coat of arms

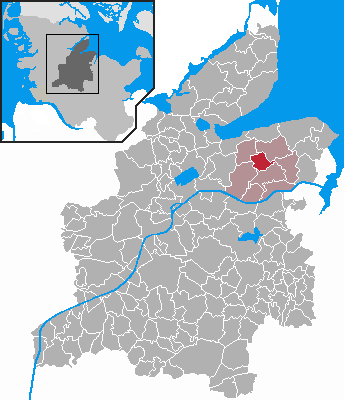
- Location of Gettorf within Rendsburg-Eckernförde district
- Interactive map of Gettorf
- Location within Germany Location within Schleswig-Holstein
- Coordinates: 54°24′28″N 9°58′27″E
- Country: Germany
- State: Schleswig-Holstein
- District: Rendsburg-Eckernförde
- Municipal assoc.: Dänischer Wohld

Government
  - Mayor: Marco Koch (CDU)

Area
  - Total: 9.35 km^{2} (3.61 sq mi)
- Elevation: 28 m (92 ft)

Population (2025-12-31)
  - Total: 7,451
  - Density: 797/km^{2} (2,060/sq mi)
- Time zone: UTC+01:00 (CET)
  - Summer (DST): UTC+02:00 (CEST)
- Postal codes: 24214
- Dialling codes: 04346
- Vehicle registration: RD
- Website: www.gettorf.de

Gettorf (German pronunciation: [ˈɡɛtɔʁf]; Danish: Gettorp) is a town in the district Rendsburg-Eckernförde between Kiel and Eckernförde. It has an estimated population of 7,563 and an area of 9.35 km^{2}.

== History ==
Gettorf was probably founded by Jutian and Saxon settlers between 1190 and 1220 and was first mentioned in a text in 1259 as “Ghetdorpe”.

== Economy and transport ==
The economy of Gettorf is characterized by small craft businesses and medium-sized service and commercial enterprises that have taken a great importance for the supply of the surrounding area. Agriculture also plays an important role.

Gettorf is connected to the national road network by a bypass of the Bundesstraße 76 (transl. federal highway 76) completed in 2004.

Since 2020 Gettorf also has an important Tesla outlet with showrooms.

== Landmarks ==
In the center of the town is the medieval St. Jürgen Church. The construction began before 1250 and was completed with the 64 m high church tower around 1494.

In the pedestrian zone at Alexanderplatz, a small statue of the devil recalls an old legend, according to which the devil threw a rock, the Düvelstein (transl. devil's stone), at the church tower, which was diverted by God and thus only grazed the tower, leaving it slightly crooked. This stone can be found outside Gettorf in the municipality of Lindau on the road between Revensdorf and Großkönigsförde.

Also, very popular for the town is its zoo with more than 850 animals that is very popular for both children and adults and was opened more than 50 years ago.
