= Jaruplund Højskole =

Coordinates: 54.7400°N 9.4117°E

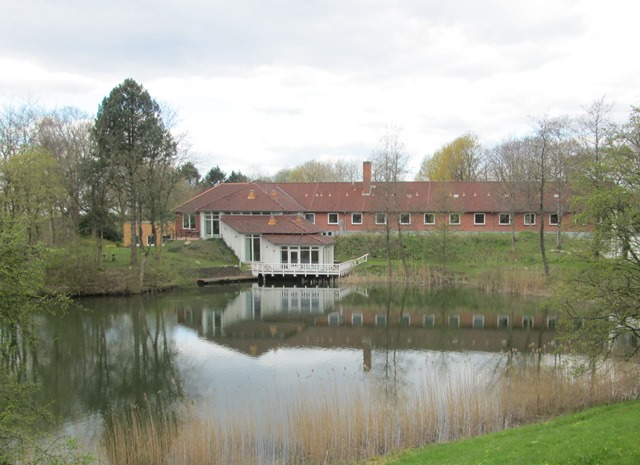
- Flensburg; Germany

Information
- School type: Folk High School
- Established: 1950
- Rector: Karsten B. Dressø
- Website: https://jaruplund.com/

Jaruplund Højskole is the only Danish folk high school in Southern Schleswig, Germany and is located 10 km south of the border in Flensburg. As a meeting point between two cultures, the school's programs focus on promoting greater understanding between the two nations and Europe at large.

== History ==
The first Danish folk high school in Southern Schleswig, Aagaard Højskole, was open from 1863 until 1889. After the Second World War, a public push to renew relations between Denmark and Germany led to the reestablishment of a folk high school in the area.

The school first opened in 1950 after land was donated by its founder, Meta Røh. Originally, classes had taken place in buildings formerly used for refugees after World War II. Today, the former refugee barracks have been replaced by modern buildings. Its modern facilities include an in-house cinema, computer lab, sauna, silver workshop, and 37 single and double ensuite bedrooms.

== Rectors ==
- Jørgen Holm Jessen, 1950–1954
- Niels Bøgh-Andersen, 1954–1972
- Karl Andersen, 1972–1979
- Arne Hyldkrog, 1979
- Egon Rasmussen, 1980–1994
- Dieter Paul Küssner, 1994–2014
- Karsten B. Dressø, 2014–present

== See also ==
- Folk High School
