= Langballig =

Langballig Langballe
- Municipality
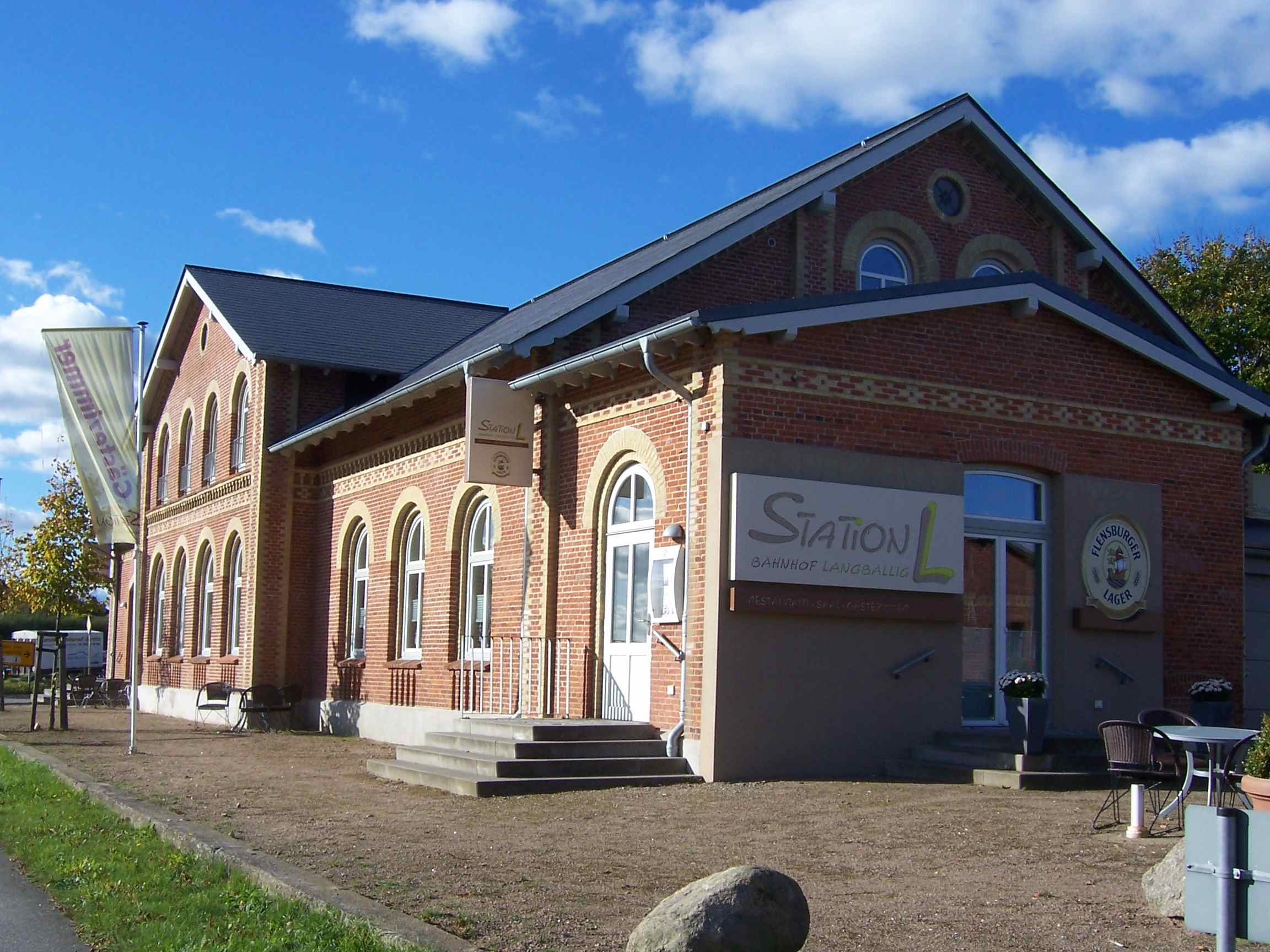
- Former railway station in Langballig

- Coat of arms

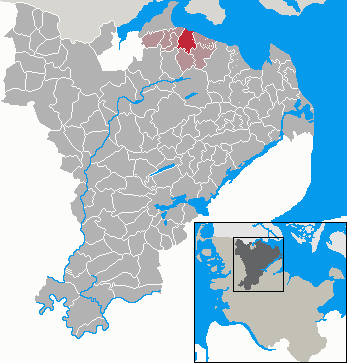
- Location of Langballig; Langballe within Schleswig-Flensburg district
- Interactive map of Langballig; Langballe
- Location within Germany Location within Schleswig-Holstein
- Coordinates: 54°47′56″N 9°38′15″E
- Country: Germany
- State: Schleswig-Holstein
- District: Schleswig-Flensburg
- Municipal assoc.: Langballig

Government
  - Mayor: Peter Dietrich Henningsen

Area
  - Total: 15.42 km^{2} (5.95 sq mi)
- Elevation: 30 m (98 ft)

Population (2025-12-31)
  - Total: 1,563
  - Density: 101.4/km^{2} (262.5/sq mi)
- Time zone: UTC+01:00 (CET)
  - Summer (DST): UTC+02:00 (CEST)
- Postal codes: 24977
- Dialling codes: 04636
- Vehicle registration: SL
- Website: www.langballig.de

Langballig (Danish: Langballe) is a municipality in the district of Schleswig-Flensburg, in Schleswig-Holstein, Germany. It is situated near the Baltic Sea, approx. 13 km east of Flensburg.

Langballig is the seat of the Amt ("collective municipality") Langballig.
