= Hüsby =

Hüsby Husby
- Municipality
- Coat of arms

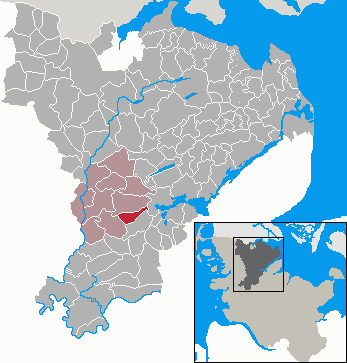
- Location of Hüsby; Husby within Schleswig-Flensburg district
- Interactive map of Hüsby; Husby
- Location within Germany Location within Schleswig-Holstein
- Coordinates: 54°30′10″N 9°29′46″E
- Country: Germany
- State: Schleswig-Holstein
- District: Schleswig-Flensburg
- Municipal assoc.: Arensharde

Government
  - Mayor: Nico Zarnekow

Area
  - Total: 9.68 km^{2} (3.74 sq mi)
- Elevation: 40 m (130 ft)

Population (2025-12-31)
  - Total: 799
  - Density: 82.5/km^{2} (214/sq mi)
- Time zone: UTC+01:00 (CET)
  - Summer (DST): UTC+02:00 (CEST)
- Postal codes: 24850
- Dialling codes: 04621
- Vehicle registration: SL

Hüsby (German pronunciation: [ˈhʏsbi]; Danish: Husby) is a municipality in the district of Schleswig-Flensburg, in Schleswig-Holstein, Germany.
