= Grundhof =

Grundhof Grumtoft
- Municipality
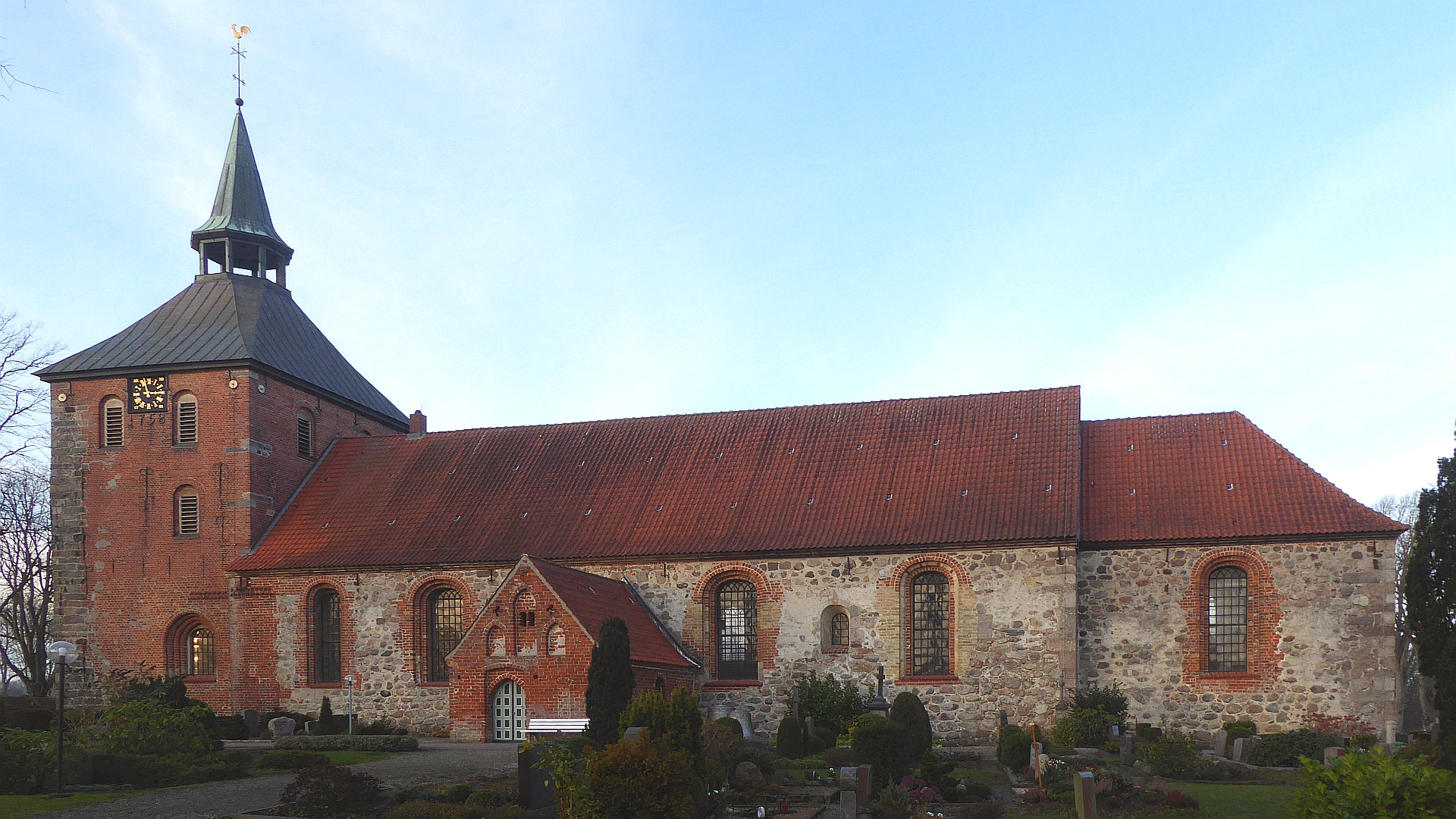
- Grundhof Church

- Coat of arms

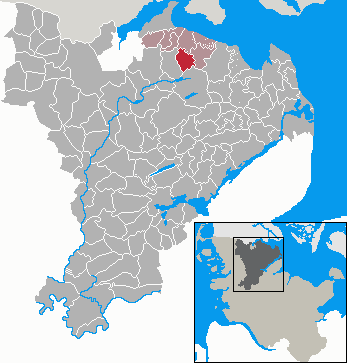
- Location of Grundhof; Grumtoft within Schleswig-Flensburg district
- Interactive map of Grundhof; Grumtoft
- Location within Germany Location within Schleswig-Holstein
- Coordinates: 54°46′N 9°39′E
- Country: Germany
- State: Schleswig-Holstein
- District: Schleswig-Flensburg
- Municipal assoc.: Langballig

Government
  - Mayor: Bernd Wunder (CDU)

Area
  - Total: 11.57 km^{2} (4.47 sq mi)
- Elevation: 24 m (79 ft)

Population (2025-12-31)
  - Total: 942
  - Density: 81.4/km^{2} (211/sq mi)
- Time zone: UTC+01:00 (CET)
  - Summer (DST): UTC+02:00 (CEST)
- Postal codes: 24977
- Dialling codes: 04634 u. 04636
- Vehicle registration: SL
- Website: www.langballig.de

Grundhof (German pronunciation: [ˈɡʁʊnthoːf]; Danish: Grumtoft) is a municipality in the district of Schleswig-Flensburg, in Schleswig-Holstein, Germany.
