= Altenholz =

- Municipality

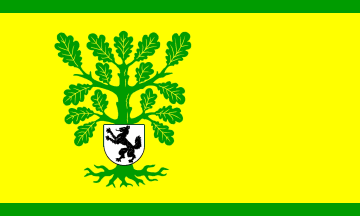
- Flag Coat of arms

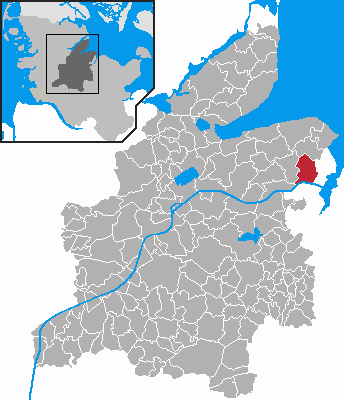
- Location of Altenholz within Rendsburg-Eckernförde district
- Interactive map of Altenholz
- Location within Germany Location within Schleswig-Holstein
- Coordinates: 54°24′N 10°8′E
- Country: Germany
- State: Schleswig-Holstein
- District: Rendsburg-Eckernförde

Government
  - Mayor: Carlo Ehrich

Area
  - Total: 19.03 km^{2} (7.35 sq mi)
- Elevation: 18 m (59 ft)

Population (2025-12-31)
  - Total: 9,781
  - Density: 514.0/km^{2} (1,331/sq mi)
- Time zone: UTC+01:00 (CET)
  - Summer (DST): UTC+02:00 (CEST)
- Postal codes: 24161
- Dialling codes: 0431, 04349
- Vehicle registration: RD, ECK
- Website: www.altenholz.de

Altenholz is a municipality in the district of Rendsburg-Eckernförde, in Schleswig-Holstein, Germany. It is situated near the Baltic Sea coast, approximately 20 kilometers (12 mi) southeast of Eckernförde, and 9 kilometers (5.6 mi) north of Kiel.
