= Tüttendorf =

- Municipality
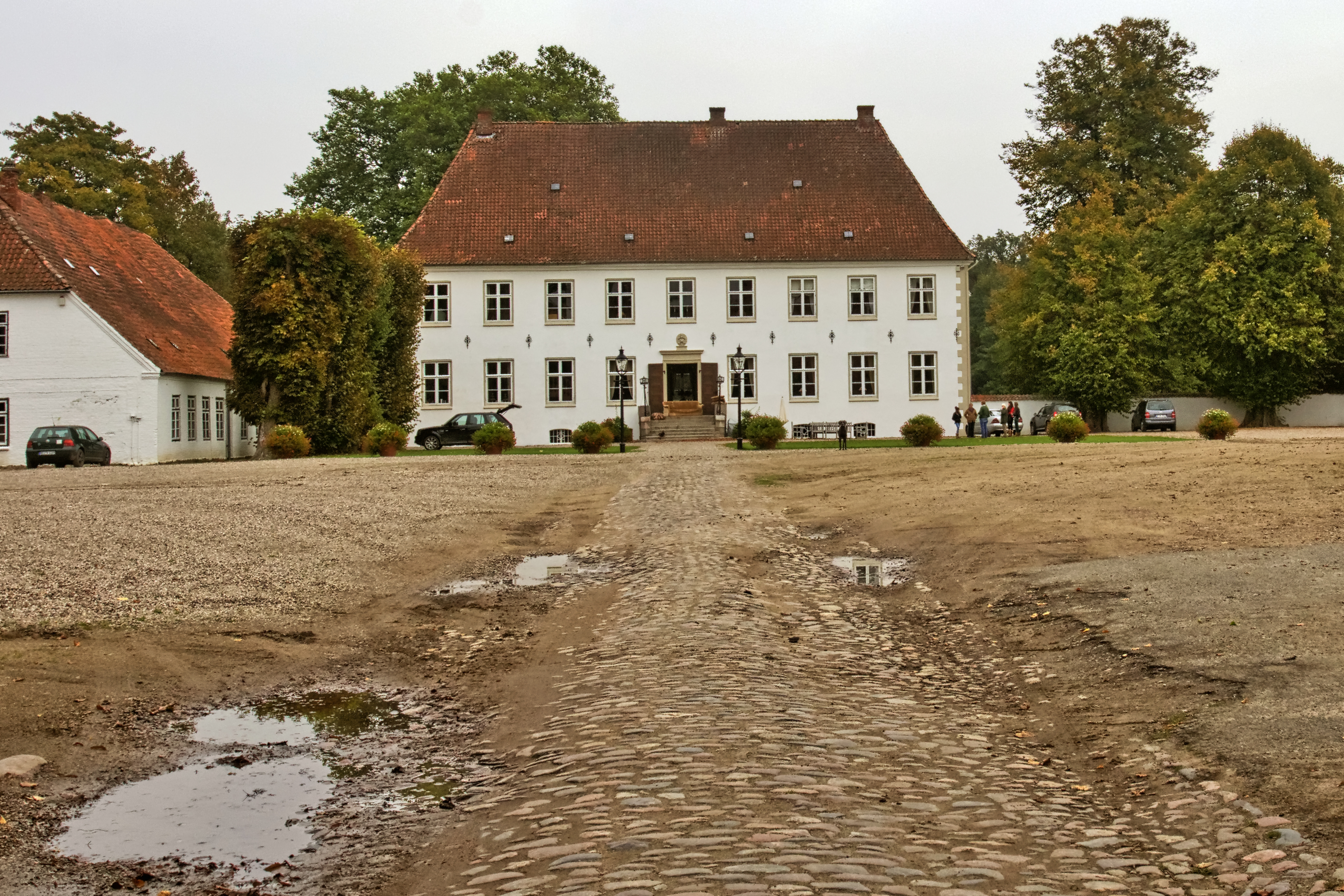

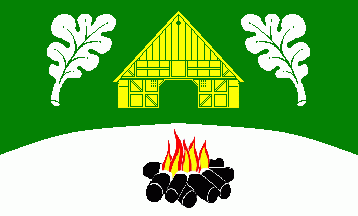
- Flag Coat of arms

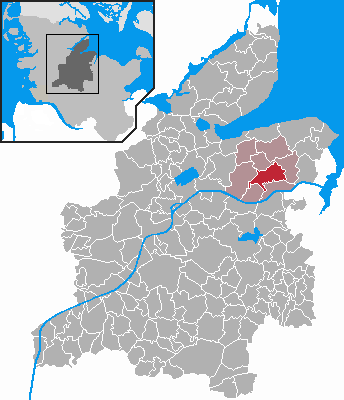
- Location of Tüttendorf within Rendsburg-Eckernförde district
- Interactive map of Tüttendorf
- Location within Germany Location within Schleswig-Holstein
- Coordinates: 54°23′N 10°0′E
- Country: Germany
- State: Schleswig-Holstein
- District: Rendsburg-Eckernförde
- Municipal assoc.: Dänischer Wohld

Government
  - Mayor: Klaus Juschkat

Area
  - Total: 17.74 km^{2} (6.85 sq mi)
- Elevation: 19 m (62 ft)

Population (2025-12-31)
  - Total: 1,302
  - Density: 73.39/km^{2} (190.1/sq mi)
- Time zone: UTC+01:00 (CET)
  - Summer (DST): UTC+02:00 (CEST)
- Postal codes: 24214
- Dialling codes: 04346
- Vehicle registration: RD
- Website: www.amt-daenischer-wohld.de

Tüttendorf (German pronunciation: [ˈtʏtn̩dɔʁf]) is a municipality in the district of Rendsburg-Eckernförde, in Schleswig-Holstein, Germany.
