= Hollingstedt =

Hollingstedt Hollingsted
- Municipality
- Coat of arms

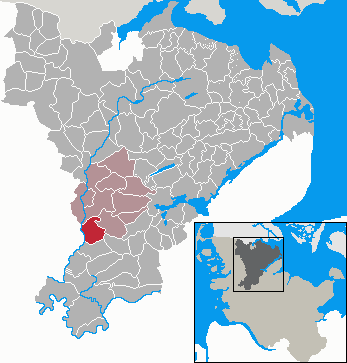
- Location of Hollingstedt; Hollingsted within Schleswig-Flensburg district
- Interactive map of Hollingstedt; Hollingsted
- Location within Germany Location within Schleswig-Holstein
- Coordinates: 54°27′N 9°20′E
- Country: Germany
- State: Schleswig-Holstein
- District: Schleswig-Flensburg
- Municipal assoc.: Arensharde

Government
  - Mayor: Holger Knutzen (CDU)

Area
  - Total: 17.51 km^{2} (6.76 sq mi)
- Elevation: 4 m (13 ft)

Population (2025-12-31)
  - Total: 1,029
  - Density: 58.77/km^{2} (152.2/sq mi)
- Time zone: UTC+01:00 (CET)
  - Summer (DST): UTC+02:00 (CEST)
- Postal codes: 24876
- Dialling codes: 04627
- Vehicle registration: SL
- Website: www.amt- silberstedt.de

Hollingstedt (German pronunciation: [ˈhɔlɪŋʃtɛt]; Danish: Hollingsted) is a municipality in the district of Schleswig-Flensburg, in Schleswig-Holstein, Germany, located on the Treene river.

== History ==
Here, in 449 the Angles are said to have boarded their vessels to sail down the Treene - Eider river system across the North Sea to Britain. In an engraved map from the year 1596, Hollingstedt is indicated as port of embarkation.

During Viking times, Hollingstedt served as a transhipment port for a ten-mile portage to Hedeby on the Schlei inlet of the Baltic, cutting short a long and perilous circumnavigation of the Jutland Peninsula. North Sea tides reached as far as Hollingstedt, so larger vessels were able to navigate the river, until a dam at Koldenbüttel closed off the Treene in 1570.

In the year 826, Ansgar, Apostle of the North, accompanied by Viking King Harald Klak coming from Mainz where Harald had been baptized, went ashore here on their way to Hedeby.

During excavations in and around Hollingstedt thousands of pottery shards were found, dating from the 6th to the 13th Century, evidence of a lively worldwide trade.
