= Munkbrarup =

- Municipality
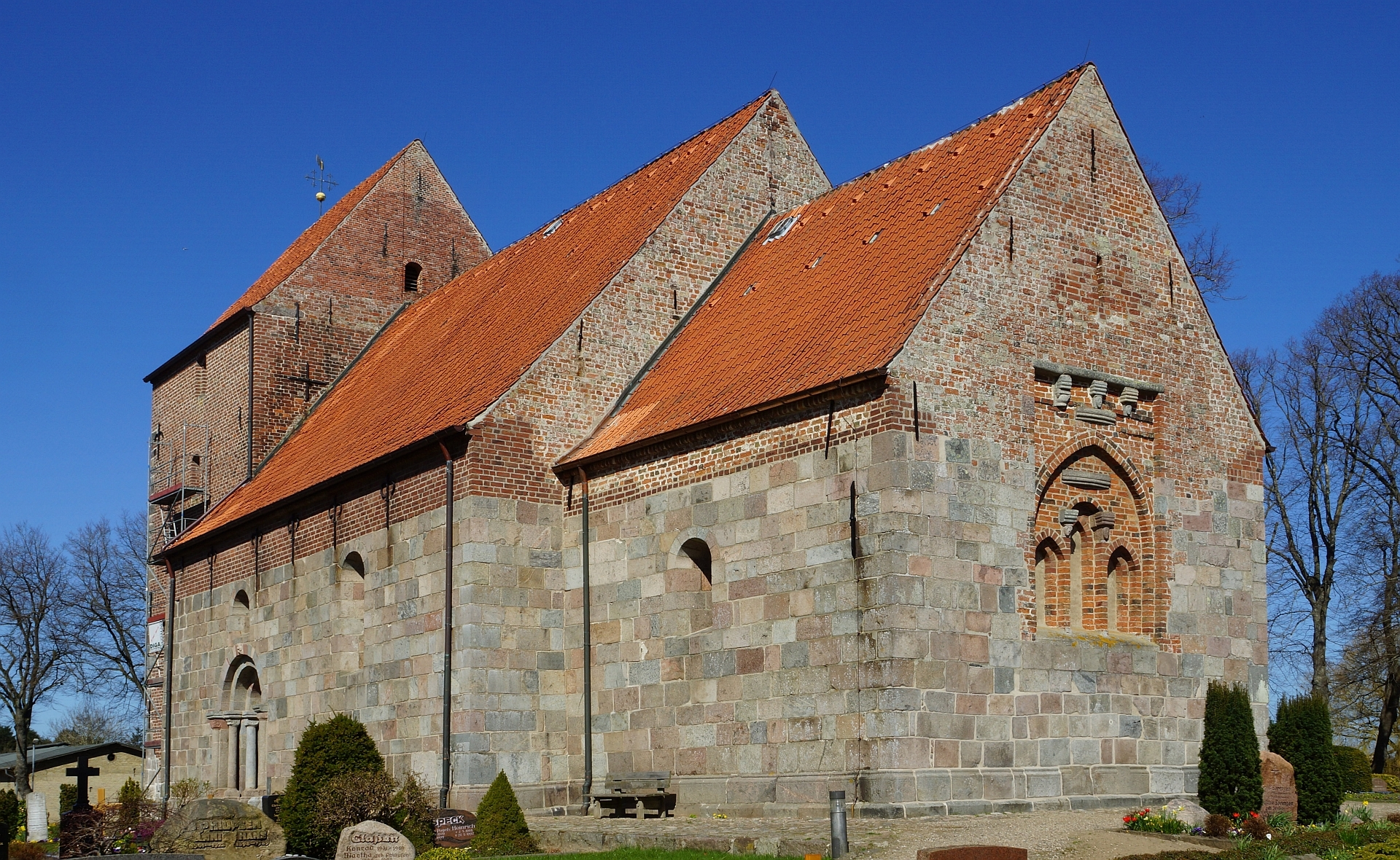
- Munkbrarup Church

- Coat of arms

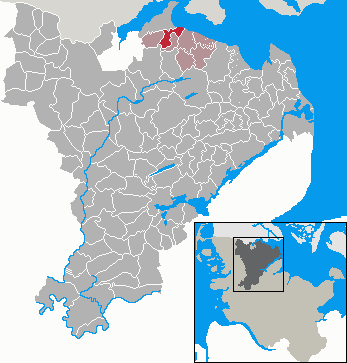
- Location of Munkbrarup within Schleswig-Flensburg district
- Interactive map of Munkbrarup
- Location within Germany Location within Schleswig-Holstein
- Coordinates: 54°48′1″N 9°33′58″E
- Country: Germany
- State: Schleswig-Holstein
- District: Schleswig-Flensburg
- Municipal assoc.: Langballig

Government
  - Mayor: Margrit Jebsen

Area
  - Total: 13.26 km^{2} (5.12 sq mi)
- Elevation: 42 m (138 ft)

Population (2025-12-31)
  - Total: 1,213
  - Density: 91.48/km^{2} (236.9/sq mi)
- Time zone: UTC+01:00 (CET)
  - Summer (DST): UTC+02:00 (CEST)
- Postal codes: 24960
- Dialling codes: 04631
- Vehicle registration: SL
- Website: www.langballig.de

Munkbrarup is a municipality in the district of Schleswig-Flensburg, in Schleswig-Holstein, Germany.
