= Neuwittenbek =

- Municipality
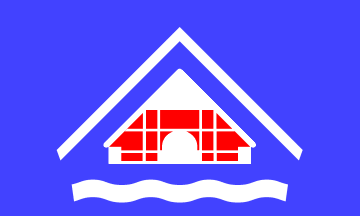
- Flag Coat of arms

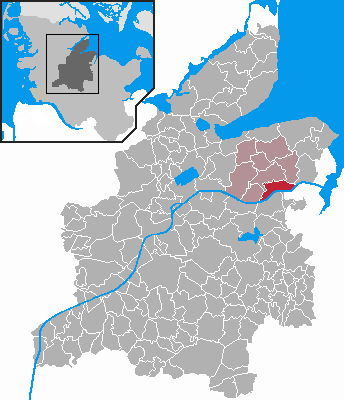
- Location of Neuwittenbek within Rendsburg-Eckernförde district
- Interactive map of Neuwittenbek
- Location within Germany Location within Schleswig-Holstein
- Coordinates: 54°22′00″N 10°01′00″E
- Country: Germany
- State: Schleswig-Holstein
- District: Rendsburg-Eckernförde
- Municipal assoc.: Dänischer Wohld

Government
  - Mayor: Wilhelm Radbruch (?)

Area
  - Total: 13.12 km^{2} (5.07 sq mi)
- Elevation: 12 m (39 ft)

Population (2025-12-31)
  - Total: 1,220
  - Density: 93.0/km^{2} (241/sq mi)
- Time zone: UTC+01:00 (CET)
  - Summer (DST): UTC+02:00 (CEST)
- Postal codes: 24214
- Dialling codes: 04346, 0431
- Vehicle registration: RD
- Website: www.amt-daenischer- wohld.de

Neuwittenbek is a municipality in the district of Rendsburg-Eckernförde, in Schleswig-Holstein, Germany.
