= Ellingstedt =

Ellingstedt Ellingsted
- Municipality
- Coat of arms

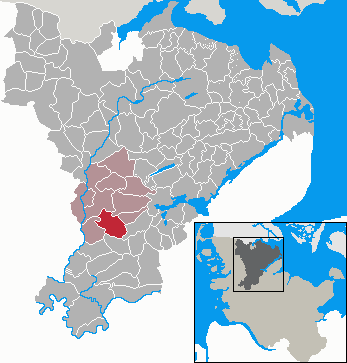
- Location of Ellingstedt; Ellingsted within Schleswig-Flensburg district
- Interactive map of Ellingstedt; Ellingsted
- Location within Germany Location within Schleswig-Holstein
- Coordinates: 54°29′N 9°24′E
- Country: Germany
- State: Schleswig-Holstein
- District: Schleswig-Flensburg
- Municipal assoc.: Arensharde

Government
  - Mayor: Klaus-Dieter Wendland

Area
  - Total: 21.49 km^{2} (8.30 sq mi)
- Elevation: 12 m (39 ft)

Population (2025-12-31)
  - Total: 777
  - Density: 36.2/km^{2} (93.6/sq mi)
- Time zone: UTC+01:00 (CET)
  - Summer (DST): UTC+02:00 (CEST)
- Postal codes: 24870
- Dialling codes: 04627
- Vehicle registration: SL
- Website: www.amt- silberstedt.de

Ellingstedt (German pronunciation: [ˈɛlɪŋʃtɛt]; Danish: Ellingsted) is a municipality in the district of Schleswig-Flensburg, in Schleswig-Holstein, Germany.
