= Felm =

- Municipality
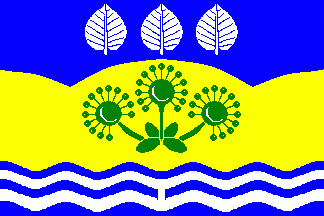
- Flag Coat of arms

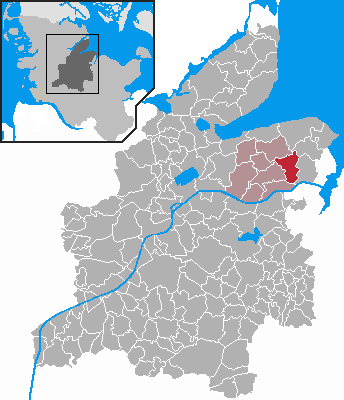
- Location of Felm within Rendsburg-Eckernförde district
- Interactive map of Felm
- Location within Germany Location within Schleswig-Holstein
- Coordinates: 54°25′N 10°3′E
- Country: Germany
- State: Schleswig-Holstein
- District: Rendsburg-Eckernförde
- Municipal assoc.: Dänischer Wohld

Government
  - Mayor: Friedrich Suhr (CDU)

Area
  - Total: 15.33 km^{2} (5.92 sq mi)
- Elevation: 21 m (69 ft)

Population (2025-12-31)
  - Total: 1,261
  - Density: 82.26/km^{2} (213.0/sq mi)
- Time zone: UTC+01:00 (CET)
  - Summer (DST): UTC+02:00 (CEST)
- Postal codes: 24244
- Dialling codes: 04346
- Vehicle registration: RD
- Website: www.amt-daenischer-wohld.de

Felm (German pronunciation: [fɛlm]) is a municipality in the district of Rendsburg-Eckernförde, in Schleswig-Holstein, Germany.
