= Harrislee =

Place in Schleswig-Holstein, Germany

Harrislee Harrislee/Harreslev
- Municipality
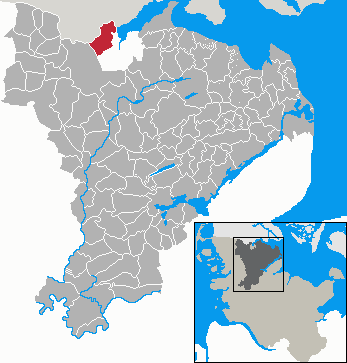
- Location of Harrislee within Schleswig-Flensburg district
- Interactive map of Harrislee
- Location within Germany Location within Schleswig-Holstein
- Coordinates: 54°47′50″N 9°22′35″E
- Country: Germany
- State: Schleswig-Holstein
- District: Schleswig-Flensburg

Government
  - Mayor: Martin Ellermann

Area
  - Total: 18.92 km^{2} (7.31 sq mi)
- Elevation: 43 m (141 ft)

Population (2025-12-31)
  - Total: 11,825
  - Density: 625.0/km^{2} (1,619/sq mi)
- Time zone: UTC+01:00 (CET)
  - Summer (DST): UTC+02:00 (CEST)
- Postal codes: 24955
- Dialling codes: 0461
- Vehicle registration: SL
- Website: www.harrislee.de

Harrislee (German pronunciation: [ˈhaʁɪsleː]; Danish: Harreslev) is a municipality in the district of Schleswig-Flensburg, in Schleswig-Holstein, Germany. It is situated on the border with Denmark and directly beside Flensburg.

== Election results ==
=== Local elections ===
2 March 2003
Party	Votes	%	Seats
Social Democratic Party	1,910	38.56	7
Christian Democratic Union	1,621	32.73	9
South Schleswig Voters' Association	1,422	28.71	7
Total	4,953	100.00	23
Valid votes	4,953	98.94	
Invalid/blank votes	53	1.06	
Total votes	5,006	100.00	
Registered voters/turnout	9,114	54.93	
Source: harislee.de

25 May 2008
Party	Votes	%	+/–	Seats	+/–
South Schleswig Voters' Association	1,695	39.63	+10.92	9	+2
Christian Democratic Union	1,354	31.66	–1.07	7	–2
Social Democratic Party	1,199	28.03	–10.53	7	0
Other	29	0.68	+0.68	–	–
Total	4,277	100.00	–	23	–
Valid votes	4,277	97.16			
Invalid/blank votes	125	2.84			
Total votes	4,402	100.00			
Registered voters/turnout	9,397	46.84			
Source: harislee.de

26 May 2013
Party	Votes	%	+/–	Seats	+/–
Social Democratic Party	1,479	35.38	+7.35	8	+1
South Schleswig Voters' Association	1,415	33.85	–5.78	8	–1
Christian Democratic Union	1,281	30.65	–1.01	7	–
Other	5	0.12	–0.56	–	–
Total	4,180	100.00	–	23	–
Valid votes	4,180	98.38			
Invalid/blank votes	69	1.62			
Total votes	4,249	100.00			
Registered voters/turnout	9,545	44.52			
Source: Gemeindewahl

6 May 2018
Party	Votes	%	+/–	Seats
South Schleswig Voters' Association	1,543	36.91	+3.06	8
Christian Democratic Union	1,375	32.89	+2.24	8
Social Democratic Party	1,247	29.83	–9.79	7
Other	15	0.36	+0.24	–
Total	4,180	100.00	–	23
Valid votes	4,180	97.64		
Invalid/blank votes	101	2.36		
Total votes	4,281	100.00		
Registered voters/turnout	9,715	44.07		
Source: Gemeindewahl

14 May 2023
Party	Votes	%	+/–	Seats	+/–
South Schleswig Voters' Association	1,743	39.21	+2.3	12	+5
Christian Democratic Union	1,149	25.85	–7.0	8	0
Social Democratic Party	891	20.04	–9.8	6	–1
Alliance 90/The Greens	637	14.33	+14.3	4	+4
Other	25	0.56	+0.2	–	–
Total	4,445	100.00	–	30	+7
Valid votes	4,445	98.54			
Invalid/blank votes	66	1.46			
Total votes	4,511	100.00			
Registered voters/turnout	9,679	46.61			
Source: Der Landeswahlleiter des Landes Schleswig-Holstein
