= Silberstedt =

Silberstedt Sølvested
- Municipality
- Coat of arms

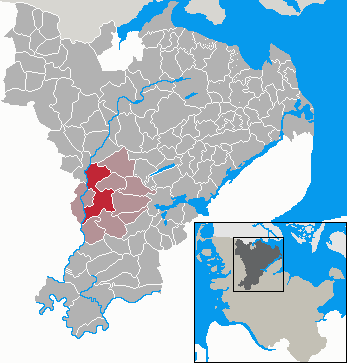
- Location of Silberstedt; Sølvested within Schleswig-Flensburg district
- Interactive map of Silberstedt; Sølvested
- Location within Germany Location within Schleswig-Holstein
- Coordinates: 54°31′N 9°22′E
- Country: Germany
- State: Schleswig-Holstein
- District: Schleswig-Flensburg
- Municipal assoc.: Arensharde

Government
  - Mayor: Thorsten Hassel (CDU)

Area
  - Total: 37.91 km^{2} (14.64 sq mi)
- Elevation: 13 m (43 ft)

Population (2025-12-31)
  - Total: 2,498
  - Density: 65.89/km^{2} (170.7/sq mi)
- Time zone: UTC+01:00 (CET)
  - Summer (DST): UTC+02:00 (CEST)
- Postal codes: 24887
- Dialling codes: 04625, 04626
- Vehicle registration: SL

Silberstedt (German pronunciation: [ˈzɪlbɐʃtɛt]; Danish: Sølvested or historic Sylvested) is a municipality in the district of Schleswig-Flensburg, in Schleswig-Holstein, Germany. It is situated approximately 13 km west of Schleswig.

Silberstedt is the seat of the Amt ("collective municipality") Arensharde.
