= Handewitt =

Municipality in Germany

- Municipality
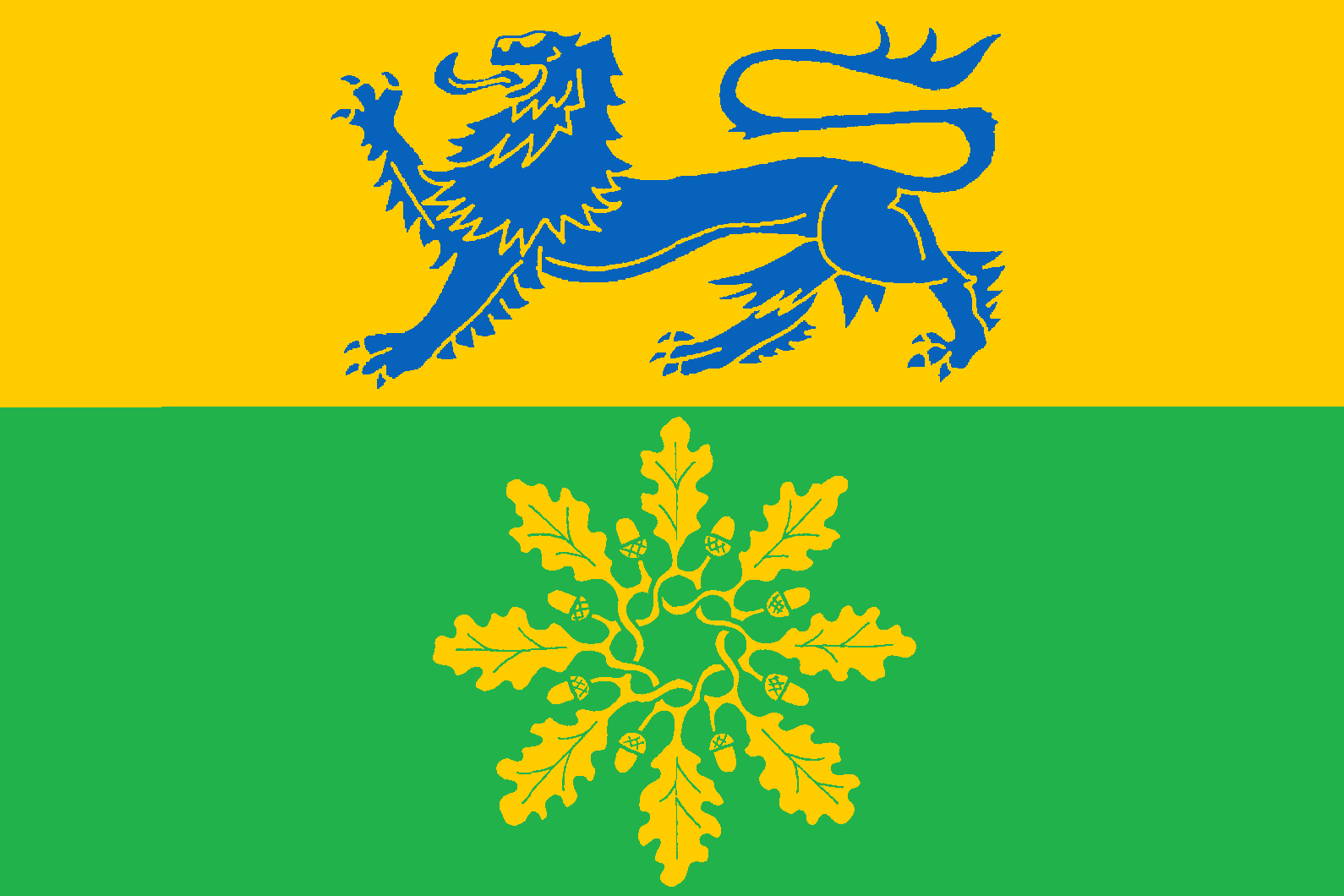
- Flag Coat of arms

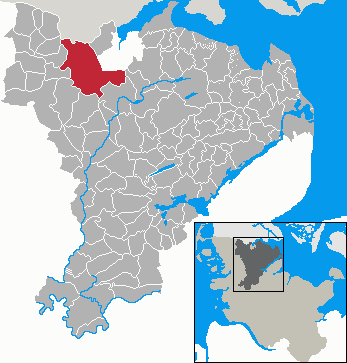
- Location of Handewitt within Schleswig-Flensburg district
- Interactive map of Handewitt
- Location within Germany Location within Schleswig-Holstein
- Coordinates: 54°46′N 09°19′E
- Country: Germany
- State: Schleswig-Holstein
- District: Schleswig-Flensburg

Government
  - Mayor: Thomas Rasmussen

Area
  - Total: 77.72 km^{2} (30.01 sq mi)
- Elevation: 43 m (141 ft)

Population (2025-12-31)
  - Total: 11,668
  - Density: 150.1/km^{2} (388.8/sq mi)
- Time zone: UTC+01:00 (CET)
  - Summer (DST): UTC+02:00 (CEST)
- Postal codes: 24976, 24983
- Dialling codes: 04608, 04630
- Vehicle registration: SL
- Website: www.gemeinde-handewitt.de

Handewitt (German pronunciation: [ˈhandəvɪt]; Danish: Hanved) is a municipality in the district of Schleswig-Flensburg, in Schleswig-Holstein, Germany. It is situated near the border with Denmark, approximately 7 km west of Flensburg.

== Handball ==
The Handball-Bundesliga team SG Flensburg-Handewitt has been successful, winning the EHF Cup in 1997, in 2001 and 2012 the EHF Cup Winners' Cup, DHB-Pokal in 2003, 2004, 2005 and 2015, the German championship in 2004, 2018 and 2019, and 2014 the EHF Champions League.

== Economy ==
Close to the A7 motorway, the shopping and commercial center Scandinavian Park is aimed primarily at customers from Scandinavia. It covers 125,000 m^{2} and opened in 2006. One of the biggest companies is Dänisches Bettenlager, the German branch of Jysk, with its administration for about 1000 shops in Germany and Austria.

== See also ==
- Handewitt (Amt)
