= Schuby =

Schuby Skovby
- Municipality
- Coat of arms

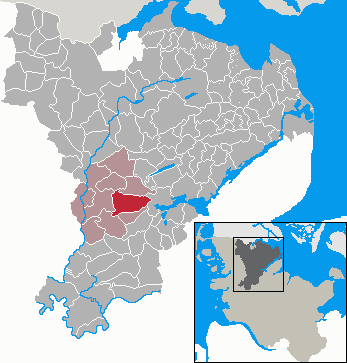
- Location of Schuby; Skovby within Schleswig-Flensburg district
- Interactive map of Schuby; Skovby
- Location within Germany Location within Schleswig-Holstein
- Coordinates: 54°31′13″N 9°29′0″E
- Country: Germany
- State: Schleswig-Holstein
- District: Schleswig-Flensburg
- Municipal assoc.: Arensharde

Government
  - Mayor: Helmut Ketelsen (CDU)

Area
  - Total: 23.94 km^{2} (9.24 sq mi)
- Elevation: 28 m (92 ft)

Population (2025-12-31)
  - Total: 2,777
  - Density: 116.0/km^{2} (300.4/sq mi)
- Time zone: UTC+01:00 (CET)
  - Summer (DST): UTC+02:00 (CEST)
- Postal codes: 24850
- Dialling codes: 04621
- Vehicle registration: SL

Schuby (Danish: Skovby) is a municipality in the district Schleswig-Flensburg, in Schleswig-Holstein in northern Germany. It is only a few kilometres west from Schleswig.

The name comes from the Danish "Skovby", meaning the "Village in the Woods". Schuby is located on the Bundesautobahn 7, from which it has its "own" exit.

Schuby is part of the Amt ("collective municipality") Arensharde.

Carles Puigdemont was arrested at a gas station in this town.
