= Kappeln =

Kappeln Kappel
- Town
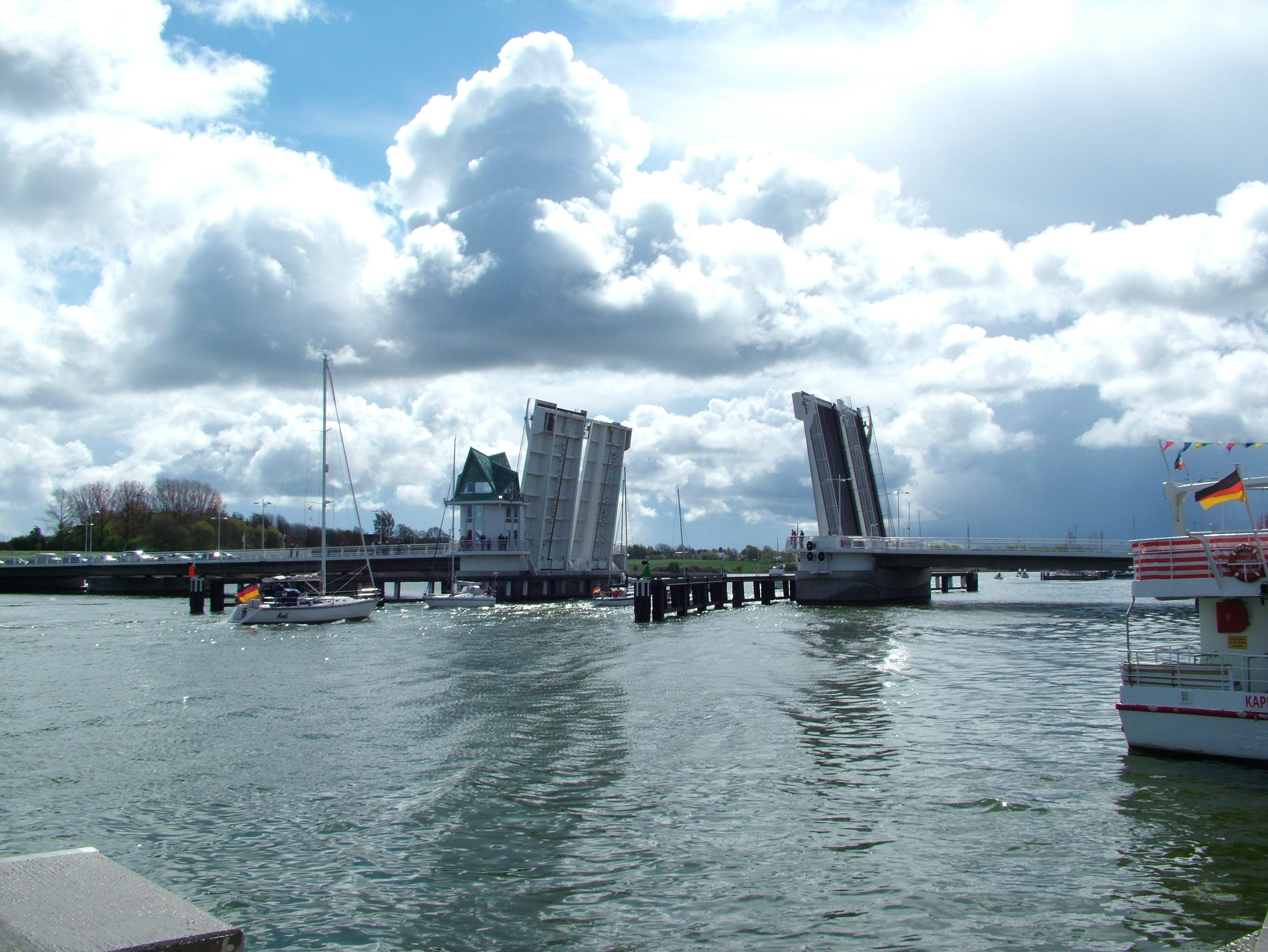
- Bridge over the Schlei

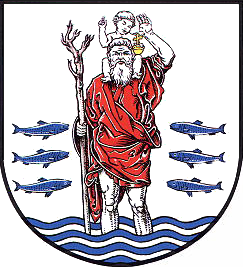
- Coat of arms

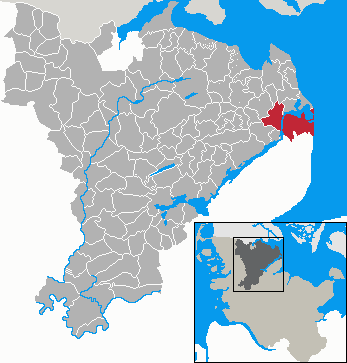
- Location of Kappeln within Schleswig-Flensburg district
- Interactive map of Kappeln
- Location within Germany Location within Schleswig-Holstein
- Coordinates: 54°39′41″N 9°55′52″E
- Country: Germany
- State: Schleswig-Holstein
- District: Schleswig-Flensburg

Government
  - Mayor: Joachim Stoll (Ind.)

Area
  - Total: 43.33 km^{2} (16.73 sq mi)
- Elevation: 9 m (30 ft)

Population (2025-12-31)
  - Total: 8,996
  - Density: 207.6/km^{2} (537.7/sq mi)
- Time zone: UTC+01:00 (CET)
  - Summer (DST): UTC+02:00 (CEST)
- Postal codes: 24376
- Dialling codes: 04642, 04644
- Vehicle registration: SL
- Website: www.kappeln.de

Kappeln (German pronunciation: [ˈkapl̩n]; Danish: Kappel) is a town in the district of Schleswig-Flensburg, in Schleswig-Holstein, Germany. It is situated on the north bank of the Schlei, approx. 30 km (19 mi) northeast of Schleswig, and 35 km (22 mi) southeast of Flensburg. For the eastern Angeln and the northern Schwansen, Kappeln has center function.

== History ==
Kappeln was first mentioned in records in 1357. In 1870 Kappeln received town privileges, after it was a Flecken. A Flecken was a market town in Schleswig.

== Twin towns – sister cities ==
Kappeln is twinned with:

- Faaborg-Midtfyn, Denmark (1984)
- Ustka, Poland (1991)
- Merate, Italy (2007)

== Notable people ==
- Jacob Moser (1839–1922), entrepreneur, Zionist and philanthropist
- Friedrich Koch (1859–1947), church painter
