= Birka =

Archaeological site on Björkö in Sweden

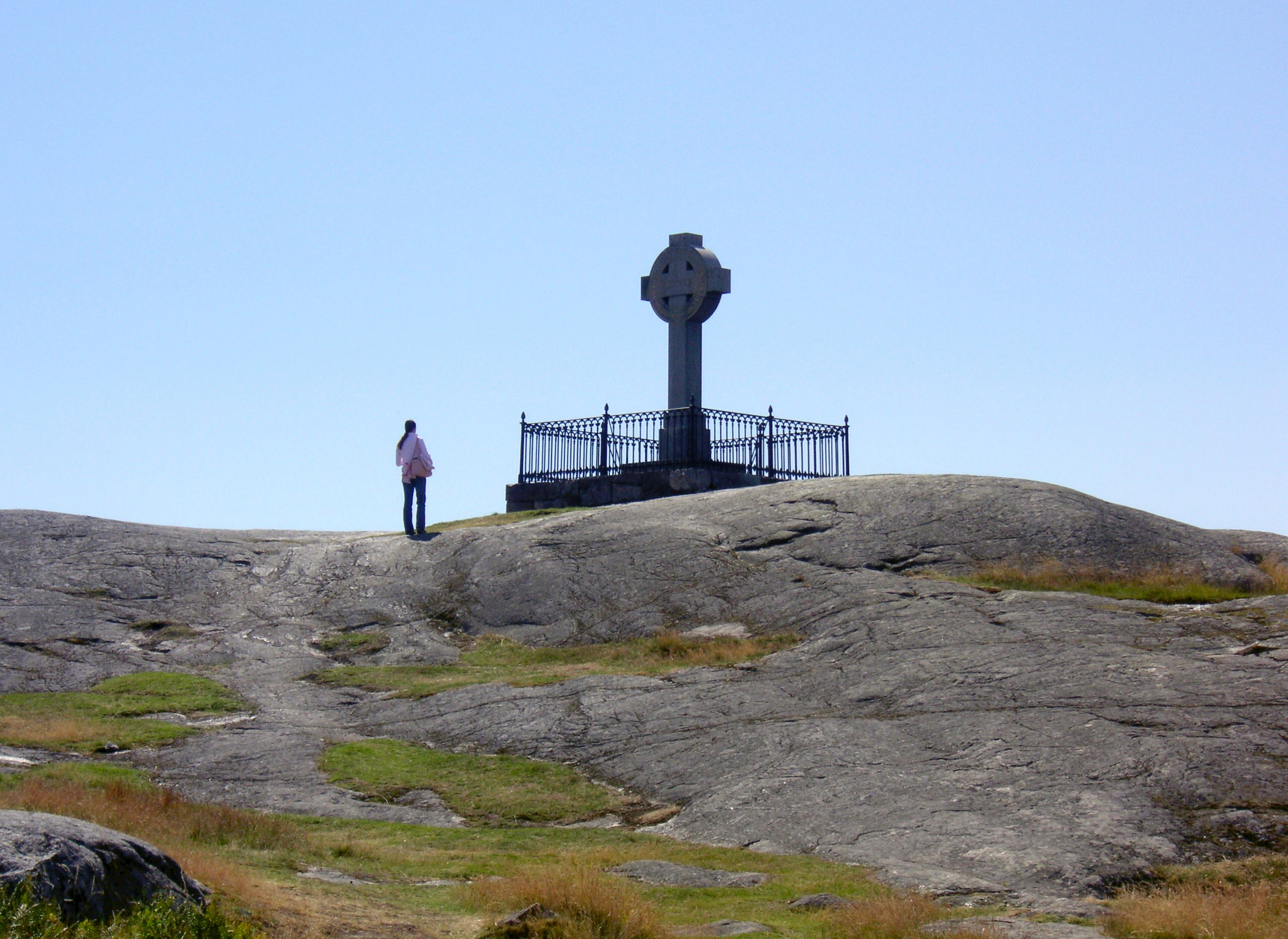
- Ansgars Cross in Birka
- Interactive map of Birka
- 59°20′10″N 17°32′43″E
- Periods: Viking Age
- Location: Ekerö Municipality, Sweden

History
- Built: 8th century
- Abandoned: 10th century

UNESCO World Heritage Site
- Official name: Birka and Hovgården
- Type: Cultural
- Criteria: iii, iv
- Designated: 1993 (17th session)
- Reference no.: 555
- Region: Europe and North America

Birka (Birca in medieval sources), on the island of Björkö (lit. "Birch Island") in present-day Sweden, was an important Viking Age trading center which handled goods from Scandinavia as well as many parts of Continental Europe and the Orient. Björkö is located in Lake Mälaren, 30 kilometers west of contemporary Stockholm, in the municipality of Ekerö.

Birka was founded around AD 750 and it flourished for more than 200 years. It was abandoned c. AD 975, around the same time Sigtuna was founded as a Christian town some 35 km to the northeast. It has been estimated that the population in Viking Age Birka was between 500 and 1000 people.

The archaeological sites of Birka and Hovgården, on the neighbouring island of Adelsö, make up an archaeological complex which illustrates the elaborate trading networks of Viking Scandinavia and their influence on the subsequent history of Europe. Generally regarded as Sweden's oldest town, Birka (along with Hovgården) has been a UNESCO World Heritage Site since 1993. Many burial sites have been uncovered at Birka, leading to the finding of many objects including jewelry and many textile fragments. In recent years, objects from Birka have been in the public eye due to ongoing academic research connecting Birka to evidence of trade with the Middle East.

== History ==
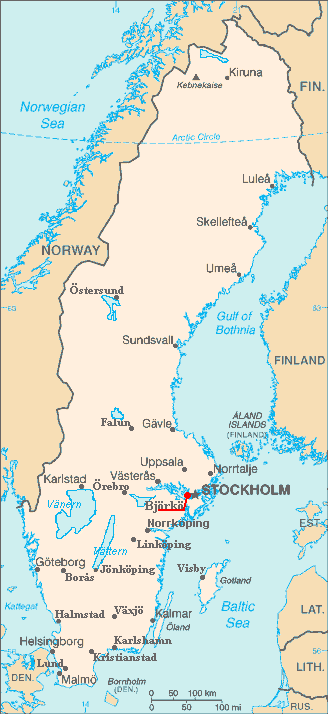
Location in Sweden

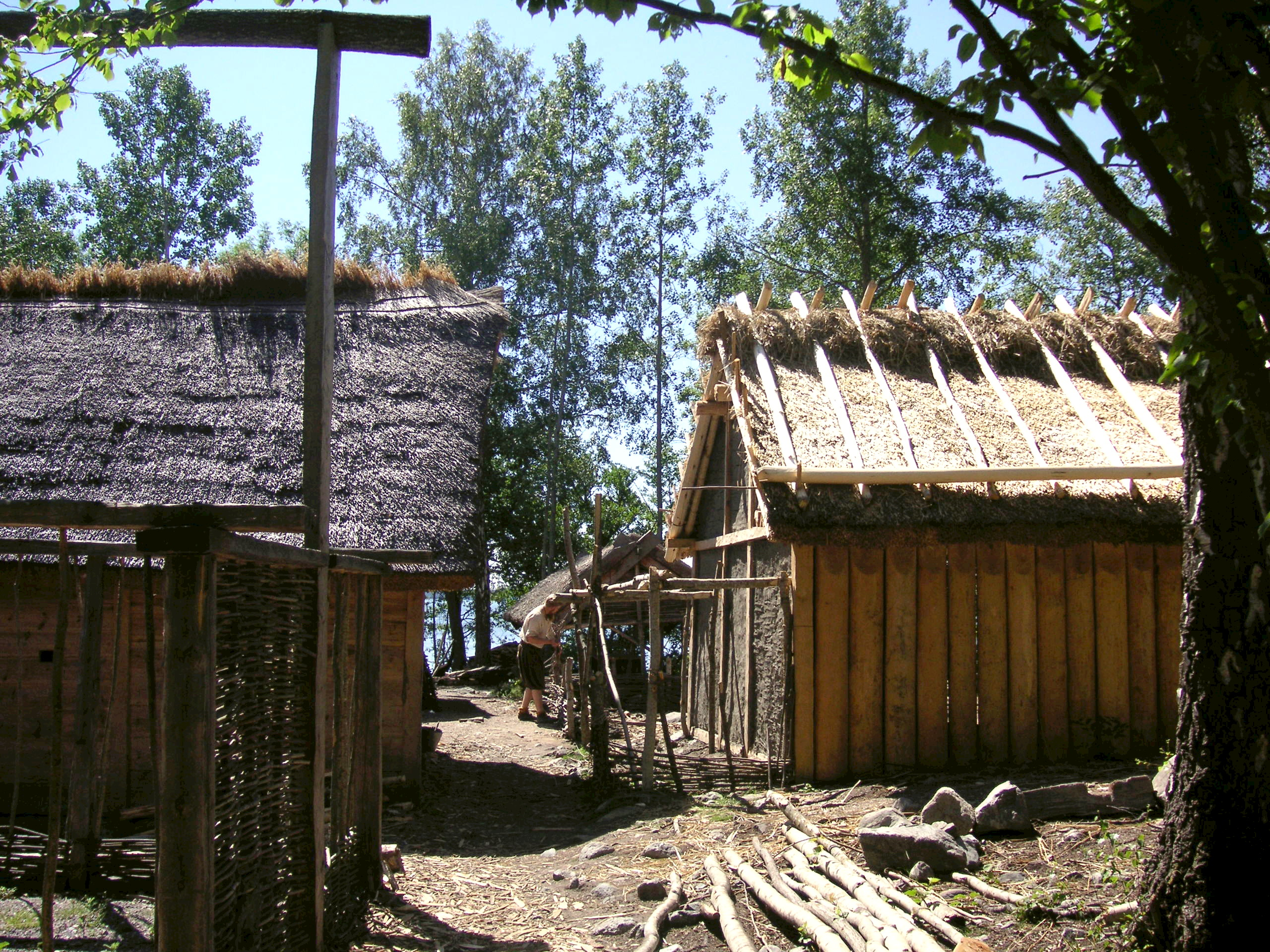
Reconstruction of housing

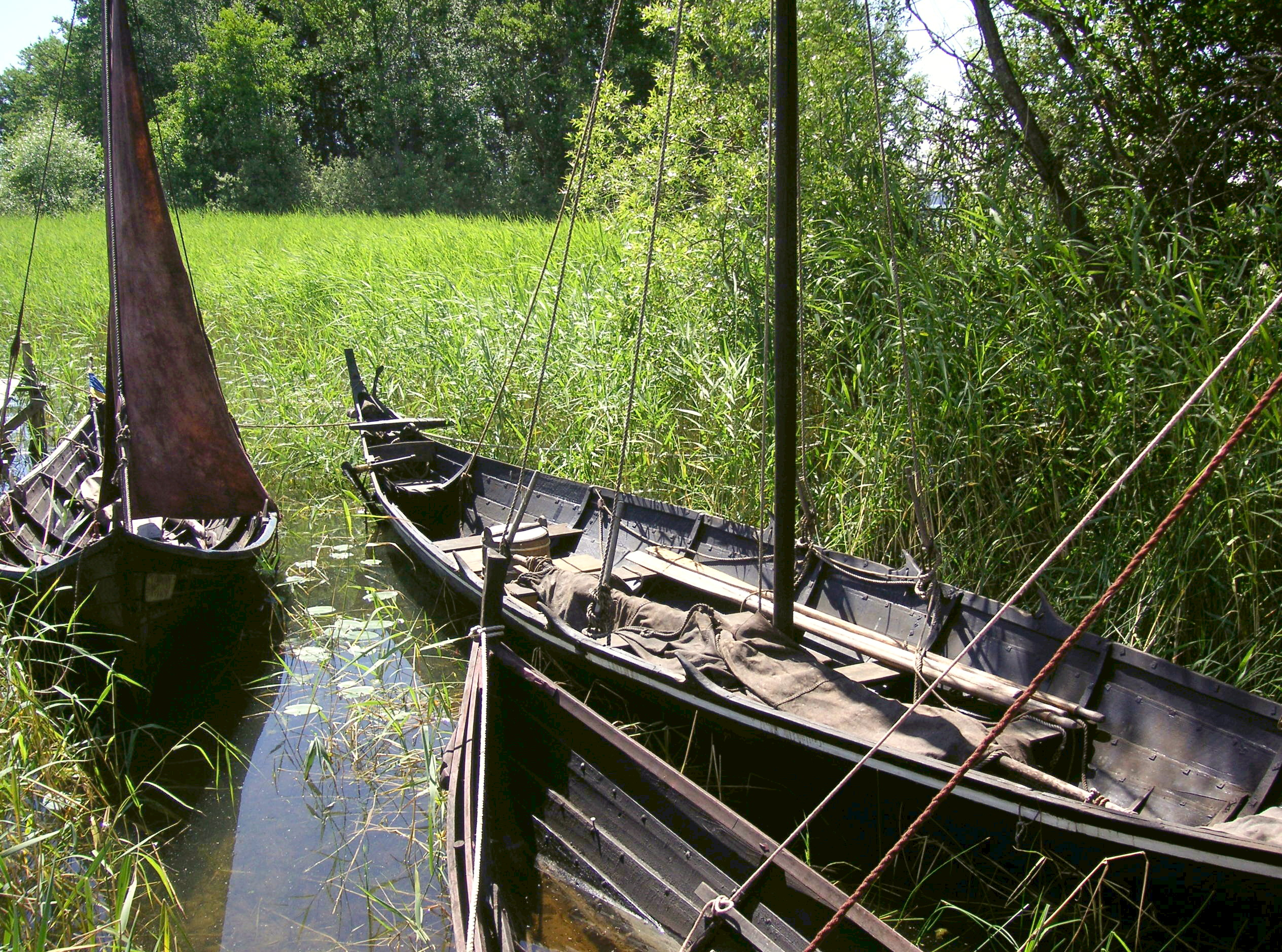
Reconstruction of boats

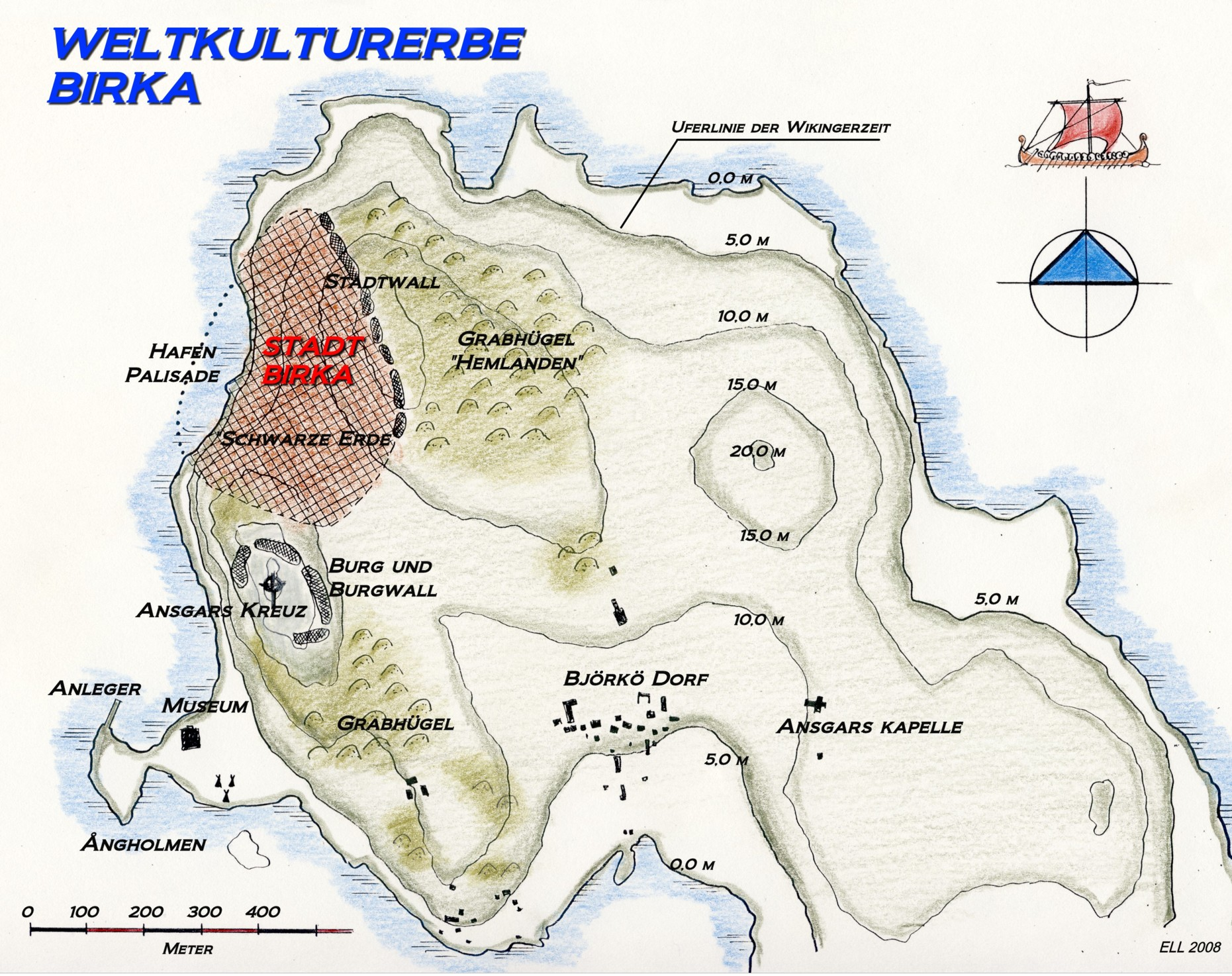
Map of Björkö and Birka today

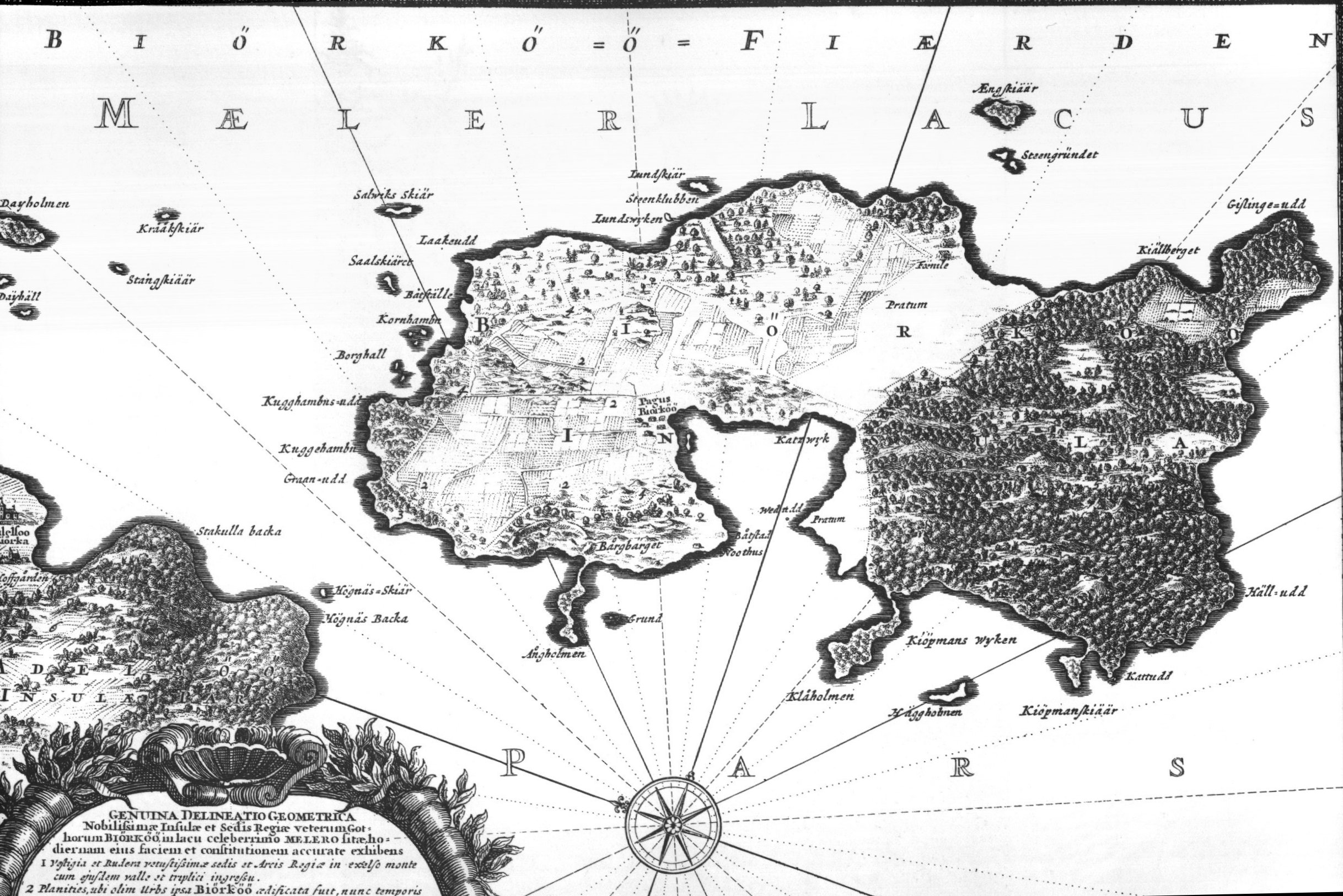
Map of Björkö, late 17th century, from Suecia antiqua et hodierna. Engraving by Willem Swidde.

Birka was founded around 750 AD as a trading port by a king or merchants trying to control trade. It is one of the earliest urban settlements in Scandinavia. Birka was the Baltic link in the Dnieper Trade Route through Ladoga (Aldeigja) and Novgorod (Holmsgard) to the Byzantine Empire and the Abbasid Caliphate. Birka is the site of the first known Christian congregation in Sweden, founded in 831 by Saint Ansgar.

As a trading center, Birka most likely offered furs, iron goods, and craft products, in exchange for various materials from much of Europe and Western Asia. Furs were obtained from the Sami people, the Finns, and people in Northwestern Russia, as well as from local trappers. Furs included bear, fox, marten, otter, beaver, and other species. Reindeer antlers and objects carved from reindeer antlers like combs were important items of trade. The trade of walrus tusks, amber, and honey is also documented.

Foreign goods found from the graves of Birka include glass and metalware, pottery from the Rhineland, clothing and textiles including Chinese silk, Byzantine embroidery with extremely fine gold thread, brocades with gold passementerie, and plaited cords of high quality. From the ninth century onwards coins minted at Haithabu in Northern Germany and elsewhere in Scandinavia start to appear. However, the vast majority of the coins found at Birka are silver dirhams from the Middle East while English and Carolingian coins are rare.

Birka was abandoned during the latter half of the 10th century. Based on the dating of the coins, the city seems to have died out around 960. Roughly around the same time, the nearby settlement of Sigtuna supplanted Birka as the main trading center in the Mälaren area. The reasons for Birka's decline are disputed. The Baltic island of Gotland was also in a better strategic position for Rus'-Byzantine trade and was gaining eminence as a mercantile stronghold. Historian Neil Kent has speculated that the area may have been the victim of an enemy assault.

== Written accounts ==
Sources from Birka are mainly archaeological remains. No texts survive from this area, though the written text Vita Ansgari ("The Life of Ansgar") by Rimbert (c. 865) describes the missionary work of Ansgar around 830 at Birka, and Gesta Hammaburgensis Ecclesiae Pontificum (Deeds of Bishops of the Hamburg Church) by Adam of Bremen in 1075 describes the Archbishop Unni, who died at Birka in 936. Saint Ansgar's work was the first attempt to convert the people of Birka from the Norse religion to Christianity. It was unsuccessful.

Both Rimbert and Adam were German clergymen writing in Latin. There are no known Norse sources mentioning the name of the settlement, or even the settlement itself, and the original Norse name of Birka is unknown. Birca is the Latinised form given in the written sources by Rimbert and Adam; and Birka is the contemporary Swedish form. The Latin name is probably derived from an Old Norse word "birk" which probably means a market place. Related to this was the Bjärköa law (bjärköarätt) which regulated the life of market places in Denmark, Norway and Sweden.

Both publications are silent on Birka's size, layout, and appearance. Based on Rimbert's account, Birka was significant because it had a port and it was the location of the regional ting. Adam only mentions the port, but otherwise, Birka seems to have been significant to him because it was the start of Ansgar's Christian mission and because Archbishop Unni was buried there.

Vita Ansgari and Adam of Bremen's Gesta are sometimes ambiguous, which has caused some controversy as to whether Birka and the Björkö settlement are the same location. Many other locations have been suggested through the years. However, Björkö is the only location that shows remains of a town of Birka's significance, which is why the vast majority of scholars regard Björkö as the location of Birka.

=== Rimbert's description ===
In Vita Ansgari ("The life of Ansgar") monk and later archbishop of Hamburg-Bremen Rimbert gives the first known description of Birka. The town was the center of Catholic missionary activities in the 9th century Sweden. Rimbert's interests were in the Christian faith, not so much in the Swedish geopolicy, so his descriptions of Birka remain approximate at best.

==== Bridgehead of Christian missionaries ====
This is how it all started in 829:

Meanwhile it happened that Swedish ambassadors had come to the Emperor Louis the Pious, and, amongst other matters which they had been ordered to bring to the attention of the emperor, they informed him that there were many belonging to their nation who desired to embrace the Christian religion, and that their king so far favoured this suggestion that he would permit God's priests to reside there, provided that they might be deemed worthy of such a favour and that the emperor would send them suitable preachers. (Chapter IX)

Ansgar then undertook the mission committed to him by the emperor, who desired that he should go to the Swedes and discover whether this people was prepared to accept the faith as their messengers had declared. (Chapter X)

Ansgar was already experienced in the missionary work in Denmark, and set forth to Sweden. Rimbert describes the trip very generally:

It may suffice for me to say that while they were in the midst of their journey they fell into the hands of pirates. The merchants with whom they were travelling, defended themselves vigorously and for a time successfully, but eventually they were conquered and overcome by the pirates, who took from them their ships and all that they possessed, whilst they themselves barely escaped on. foot to land. —With great difficulty they accomplished their long journey on foot, traversing also the intervening seas (maria), where it was possible, by ship, and eventually arrived at the Swedish port called Birka. (Chapters X and XI)

When Ansgar again travelled to Birka from Germany about 852, it went easier:

Ansgar accomplished the journey on which he had set out, and after spending nearly twenty days in a ship, he arrived at Birka (Chapter XXVI)

==== Kings ====
Several Swedish kings of the 9th century, Björn, Anund and Olof, are all mentioned in Vita to have spent time in Birka. None of them is however said to have had his residence there, as the Swedish king and his retinue periodically moved between the Husbys, parts of the network of royal estates called Uppsala öd.

King Björn met Ansgar in Birka when he arrived there in 829 (Chapter XI). Later King Olof met him there as well during his last trip in 852 (Chapter XXVI).

==== Church ====
Ansgar's missionary work resulted in first churches to be built in Sweden. Talking about Herigar, the prefect of Birka:

A little later he built a church on his own ancestral property and served God with the utmost devotion. (Chapter XI)

Herigar's church was not far from the place where tings were held:

On one occasion he himself was sitting in an assembly of people, a stage having been arranged for a council on an open plain. He then summoned his servants and told them to carry him to his church. (Chapter XIX)

Another church was also built in Sweden, however location is left open:

This Gautbert, who at his consecration received the honoured name of the apostle Simeon, went to Sweden, and was honourably received by the king and the people; and he began, amidst general goodwill and approval, to build a church there (Chapter XIV)

The exiled Swedish King Anund Uppsale confirms that either one of the churches was in Birka itself when he ponders if Birka should be plundered:

"There are there," he said, "many great and powerful gods, and in former time a church was built there, and there are many Christians there who worship Christ" (Chapter XIX)

==== Probable fortress ====
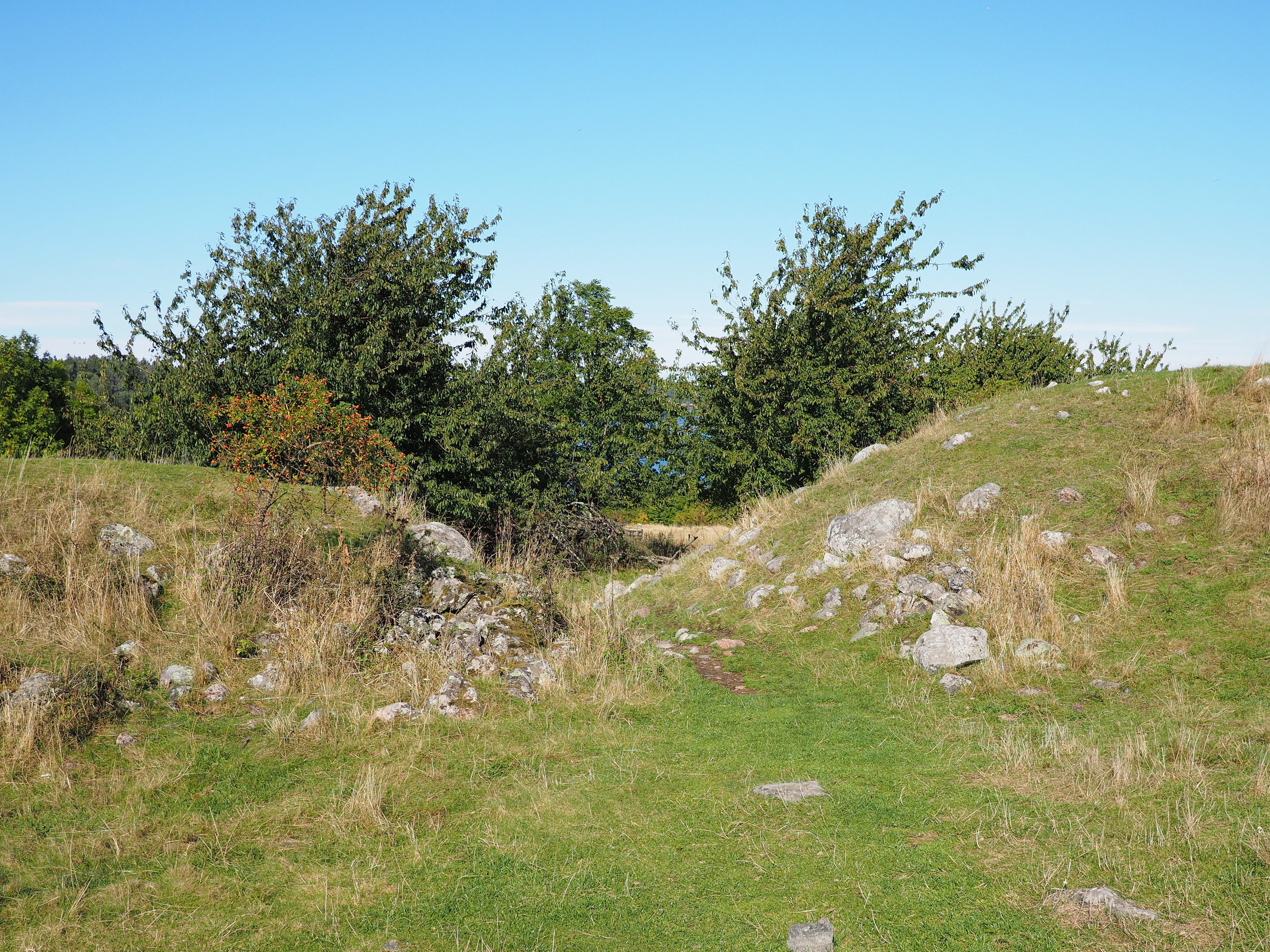
An entry point in a Viking-era defensive wall on Birka

Danes attacked Birka, accompanied with the deposed king Anund, which caused great distress in the town.

Being in great difficulty they fled to a neighbouring city (ad civitatem, quæ iuxta erat, confugerunt) and began to promise and offer to their gods—But inasmuch as the city was not strong and there were few to offer resistance, they sent messengers to the Danes and asked for friendship and alliance. —Hergeir, the faithful servant of the Lord, was angry with them and said, "They will lead away your wives and sons as captives, they will burn our city (urbs) and town (vicus)" and will destroy you with the sword (Chapter XIX)

As the neighbouring "city" is not mentioned in any other context than during the Danish attack as a place where people took refuge, it probably meant a nearby fortress. Eventually the Danes left, sparing Birka from destruction.

==== Ting assembly ====
When Ansgar asked if King Olof would permit him to establish the Christian religion in the kingdom during his second visit in 852, the king said to him:

On this account I have not the power, nor do I dare, to approve the objects of your mission until I can consult our gods by the casting of lots and until I can enquire the will of the people in regard to this matter. Let your messenger attend with me the next assembly (Chapter XXVI)

When the day for the assembly which was held in the town of Birka drew near, in accordance with their national custom the king caused a proclamation to be made to the people by the voice of a herald, in order that they might be informed concerning the object of their mission. —The king then rose up from amongst the assembly and forthwith directed one of his own messengers to accompany the bishop's messenger, and to tell him that the people were unanimously inclined to accept his proposal and at the same time to tell him that, whilst their action was entirely agreeable to him, he could not give his full consent until, in another assembly, which was to be held in another part of his kingdom, he could announce this resolution to the people who lived in that district. (Chapter XXVII)

Tings were huge open-air events, which required plenty of space. The more important ting that king Olof talked about was probably the Ting of all Swedes, which was held at the end of February in Uppsala, during the Disting. The king was obliged to obey the common decisions made at this ting, and the most powerful man at this assembly was not the king, but the lawspeaker of Tiundaland. Locally important tings were the Westrogothic Ting of all Geats in Skara and the Ostrogothic Lionga ting in the vicinity of today's Linköping.

=== Adam of Bremen's description ===
In Gesta Hammaburgensis ecclesiae pontificum (Deeds of Bishops of the Hamburg Church), Adam of Bremen mentions Birka many times, and the book is the main source of information on the city. After its initial release in 1075–6, Gesta was complemented with supplementary Scholias until the death of Adam in the 1080s. Birca is described as an existing city in the original version, but then as destroyed in Scholia 138.

One of Adam's main sources had been the German bishop Adalvard the Younger of Sigtuna and later of Skara as hinted in Scholia 119. He was also very familiar with Rimbert's work. Adam himself never visited Birka.

==== Location and port ====
Adam described Birka as a Geatish port town and had gathered many details about it.

Birka is the main Geatish town (oppidum Gothorum), situated in the middle of Sweden (Suevoniae), not far (non longe) from the temple called Uppsala (Ubsola) which the Swedes (Sueones) held in the highest esteem when it comes to the worship of the gods; here forms an inlet of the Baltic or the Barbaric Sea a port facing north which welcomes all the wild peoples all around this sea but which is risky for those who are careless or ignorant of such places ... they have therefore blocked this inlet of the troubled sea with hidden masses of rocks along more than 100 stadions (18 km). On this anchorage, being the best sheltered within the maritime region of Sweden (Suevoniae), all the ships belonging to Danes (Danorum) known as Norwegians (Nortmannorum) as well as to Slavs (Sclavorum), Sembrians (Semborum) and other Scythian (Scithiae) peoples use to convene every year for sundry necessary commerce. (I 62)

Turning from the northern parts to the mouth of the Baltic Sea we first meet the Norwegians (Nortmanni), then the Danish region of Skåne (Sconia) stands out, and beyond these live the Geats (Gothi) for a long stretch all the way to Birka. (IV 14)

Having described Västergötland and Skara, Adam writes:

Beyond it Östergötland (Ostrogothia) extends along the sea, that is called the Baltic Sea, all the way to Birka. (IV 23)

Adam also had travel instructions from Skåne to Sigtuna:

From Skåne (Sconia) of the Danes one reaches Sigtuna (Sictonam) or Birka after five days at sea, for they are indeed alike. But by land from Skåne across the Geatish people (Gothorum populos) and cities Skara (Scaranem), Telgas and Birka, one reaches Sigtuna only after a full month. (IV 28)

Scholia 121 of IV 20 tells also:

For those who sail from Skåne (Sconia) of the Danes to Birka, the journey takes five days, from Birka to Russia (Ruzziam) likewise five days at sea. (Scholia 121)

==== Bishop ====
Archbishopric of Hamburg-Bremen that oversaw the missionary work in Scandinavia until 1103, had appointed bishops to Sweden at least from 1014 onwards, the first see being in Skara. Several bishops were appointed for Sweden in 1060s, one also for Birka.

For Sweden, six were consecrated: Adalvard the Elder (Adalwardum) and Acilinum, also Adalvard the Younger (Adalwardum) and Tadicum, and furthermore Simeon (Symeonem) and the monk John (Iohannem). (III 70)

Scholia 94 appends this as follows:

Adalvard the Elder (Adalwardus senior) was to superintend both lands of the Geats (uterque praefectus est Gothiae), Adalvard the Younger Sigtuna (Sictunam) and Uppsala (Ubsalam), Simeon (Symon) the Sami people (Scritefingos), John (Iohannes) the islands of the Baltic Sea. (Scholia 94)

Furthermore, the following was said about John's location after talking about Birka:

For this city he ordained, as the first among our people, the abbot Hiltin, whom he wanted to call John. (IV 20)

John seems to have been situated in Birka in order to prepare for the missionary work among the many heathen people of Birca. This was a logical continuation to Birka's position as the first missionary town in Sweden.

==== Location of Unni's tomb ====
Scholia 122 of IV 20 locates the tomb of Hamburg's archbishop Unni in Birka:

There is the port of Saint Ansgar and the tomb of the holy Archbishop Unni, and a familiar haven, it is said, for the holy confessors of our diocese. (Scholia 122)

According to Gesta, Unni had died in 936 (I 64).

==== Destruction ====
After having consistently described Birka as an existing city, Scholia 138 of IV 29 describes Birka's sudden demise. Talking about Adalvard the Younger, the bishop of Sigtuna and later that of Skara, Adam or a later copyist has written:

During his journey he seized the opportunity to make a detour to Birka, which is now reduced to loneliness so that one can hardly find vestiges of the city; therefore impossible to come upon the tomb of the holy Archbishop Unni. (Scholia 138)

The remark does not make it clear if Adalvard found the city destroyed or if that had happened after his visit and the later remark was just to warn the future pilgrims not to go there anymore in vain.

== Björkö archaeological site ==
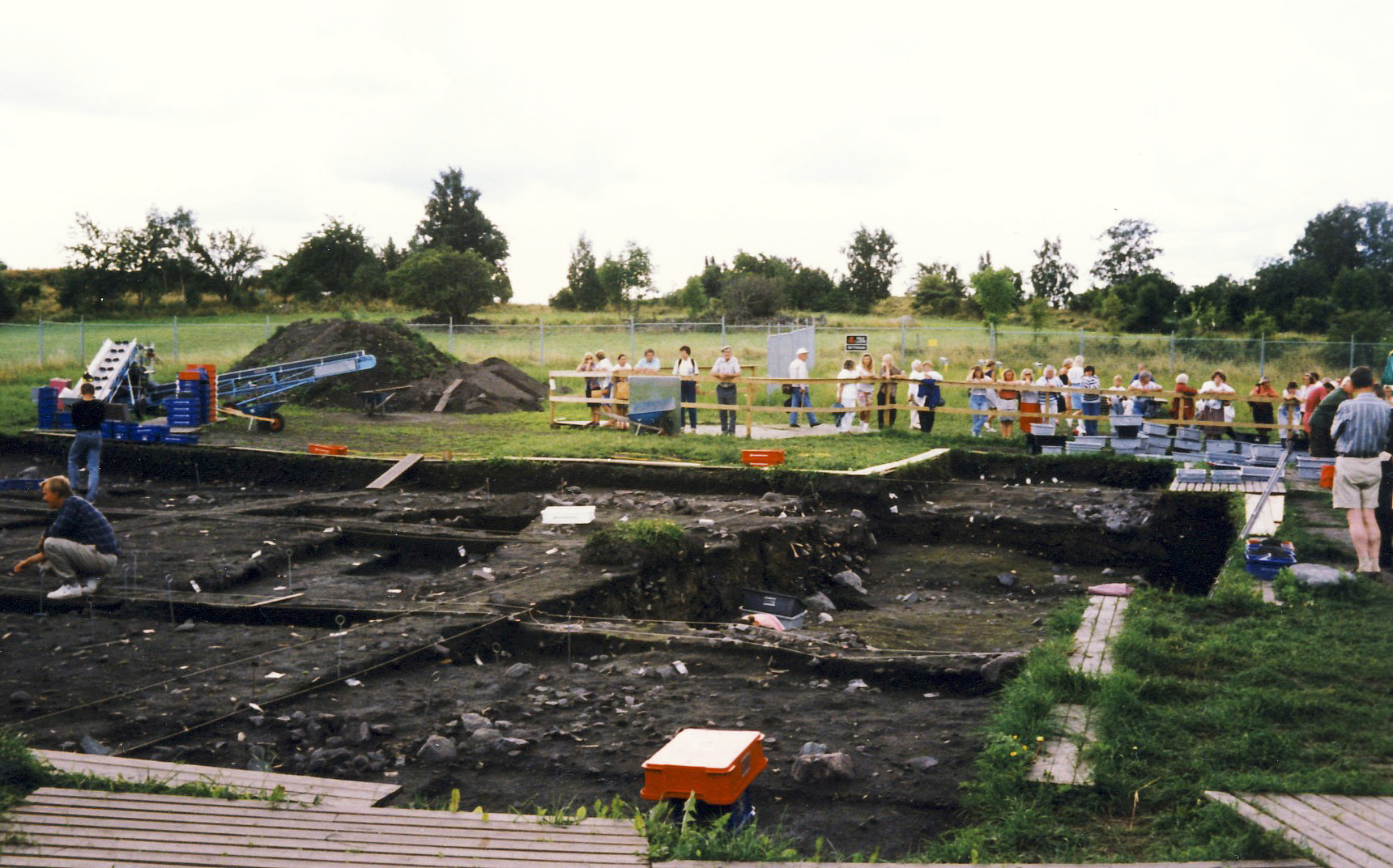
1991 excavation in dark earth

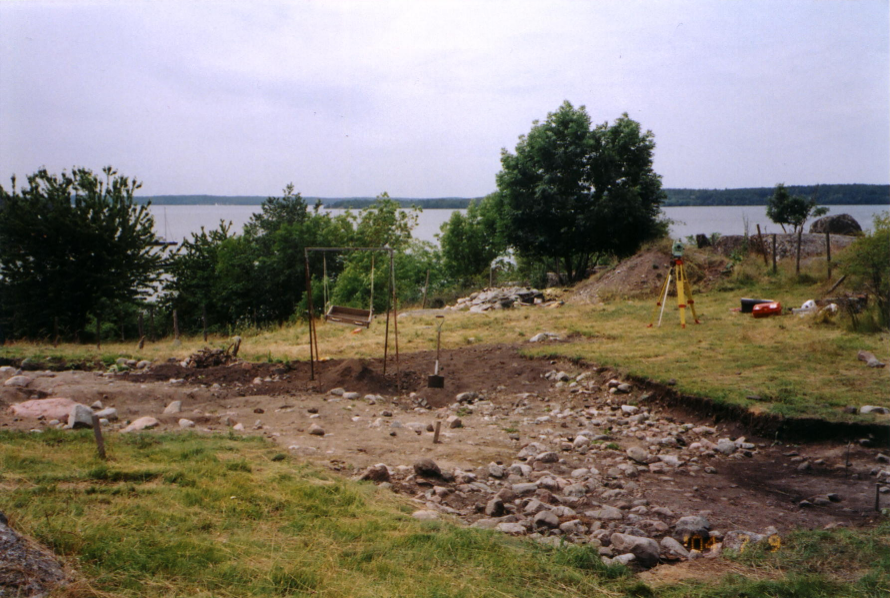
July 2004 excavation of Birka

The exact location of Birka was also lost during the centuries, leading to speculation from Swedish historians. In 1450, the island of Björkö was first claimed to be Birka by the "Chronicle of Sweden" (Prosaiska krönikan).

In search of Birka, National Antiquarian Johan Hadorph was the first to attempt excavations on Björkö in the late 17th century.

In the late 19th century, Hjalmar Stolpe, an entomologist by education, arrived on Björkö to study fossilized insects found in amber on the island. Stolpe found very large amounts of amber, which is unusual since amber is not normally found in lake Mälaren. Stolpe speculated that the island may have been an important trading post, prompting him to conduct a series of archeological excavations between 1871 and 1895. The excavations soon indicated that a major settlement had been located on the island and eventually Stolpe spent two decades excavating the island. After Björkö came to be identified with ancient Birka, it has been assumed that the original name of Birka was simply Bierkø (sometimes spelled Bjärkö), an earlier form of Björkö.

A significant collection of textiles fragments were retrieved during excavations, mostly from chamber graves. Agnes Geijer published the most detailed analysis of this collection in 1938, although her study was based upon only around 5% of the 4800 textile fragments preserved from the site. The collection represents a usual variety of different types of textiles showing high quality textiles manufactured by different techniques like tabby and twill. Mostly made from wool and flax, the quality of the textiles studied by Geijer ranged from very coarse to fine fabrics with high thread counts that required complicated techniques to create. The variety of materials and techniques to make the tablet woven textiles led Geijer to theorize that some of the textiles were imported. Geijer also found remains of the three-end twill textile that has not been found anywhere else in Northern Europe. Geijer theorized that some of the fragments came from the East, possibly China, due the use of gold and silver wire as well as silk.

Ownership of Björkö is today mainly in private hands and is used for farming and management also benefits biodiversity.

The archaeological remains are located in the north part of Björkö and span an area of about 7 hectares (17 acres). The remains are both burial-sites and buildings, and in the south part of this area, there is also a hill fort called "Borgen" ("The Fortress"). The construction technique of the buildings is still unknown, but the main material was wood. An adjacent island holds the remains of Hovgården, an estate that housed the King's retinue during visits.

Approximately 700 people lived at Birka when it was at its largest, and about 3,000 graves have been found. Its administrative center was supposedly located outside of the settlement itself, on the nearby island of Adelsö.

The most recent large excavation was undertaken between 1990 and 1995 in a region of dark earth, believed to be the site of the main settlement.

=== Shipyard ===
On 15 June 2022, it was announced that archaeologists from Stockholm University's Archaeological Research Laboratory had found a Viking Age shipyard in Lake Mälaren. It was the first time a site like the shipyard had been found.

"The site found consisted of a stone-lined depression in the Viking Age shore zone with a wooden boat slip at the bottom. The finds at the site consist of large quantities of both unused and used boat rivets, whetstones made from slate and woodworking tools."

== Björkö objects ==
=== "Allah" textile controversy ===
In 2017, Annika Larsson, a textile researcher, claimed in a press release by Uppsala University to have discovered a textile among the finds from Birka that bore the Arabic words "Allah" and "Ali". She theorized that some of the Vikings could have been influenced by Islam, leading to widespread media coverage. Stephennie Mulder, a professor of Islamic art at the University of Texas at Austin, replied to Larsson's findings in a Twitter thread. Based on the epigraphy, Mulder argued that the textile bore a simple geometric pattern and not Arabic writing because the dating of the textile was from the 10th century and the style of writing Larsson claimed was on the textile, square Kufic, is not seen until the 15th century. Larsson had also proposed extensions to the tablet weaving that expanded beyond the original drawing by Agnes Geijer in 1938. Textile specialist Carolyn Priest-Dorman argued that the expansions are impossible because the fragment has finished edges called selvages and the band would have shown cut weft threads if the fragment had been narrowed at some point. Larsson's drawings were speculative and not based on evidence that an expansion existed. The backlash following these criticisms led the press release on the Uppsala University website to include a note that Larsson's research was preliminary and a comment regarding the criticisms. In 2020, Larsson published an article reiterating her claim that the textile bore Arabic writing, without addressing these criticisms.

=== "Allah" ring controversy ===
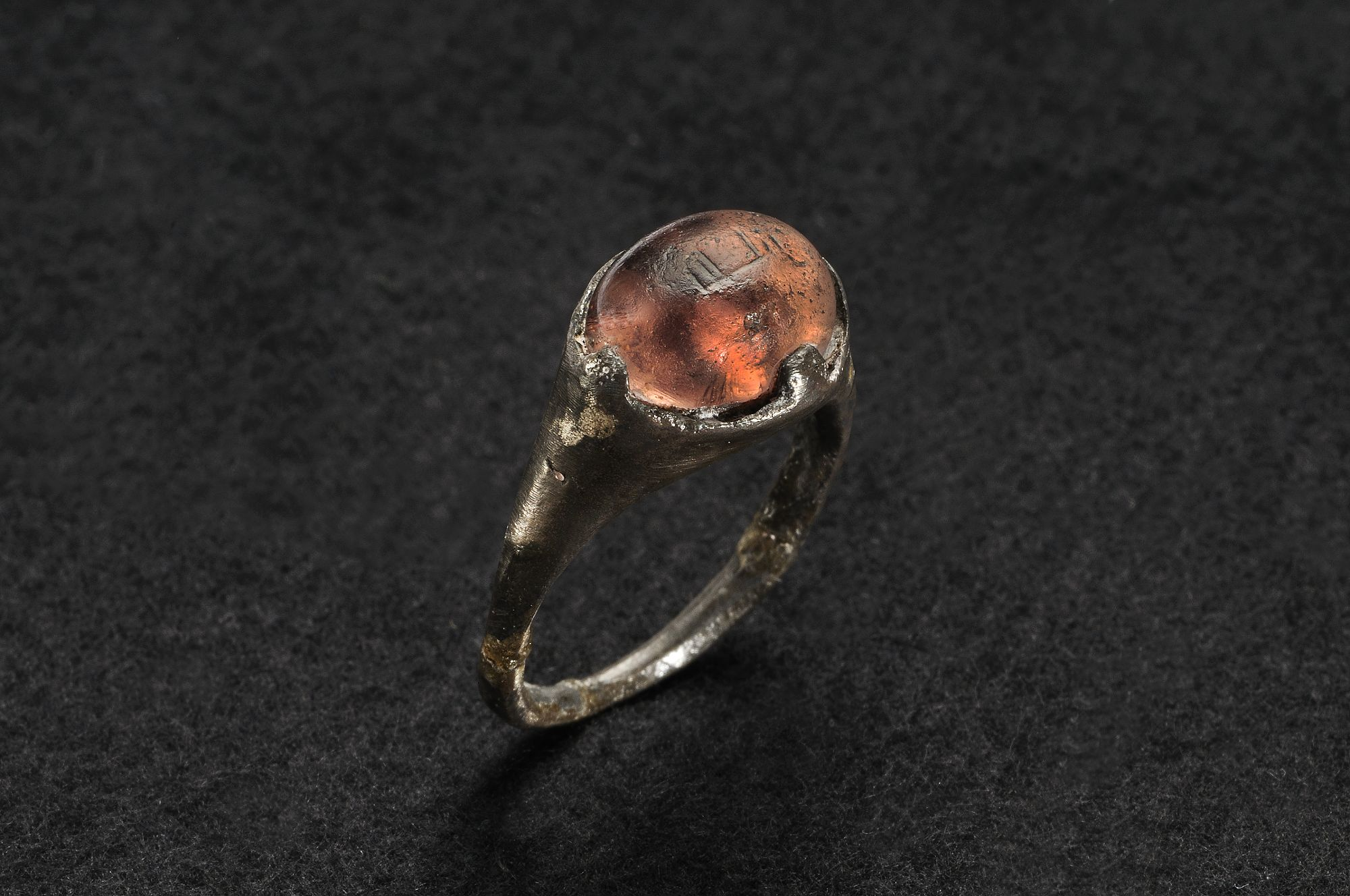
Ring theorized to read "Allah" found at Birka

A ring was found during the archeological excavations at Birka between 1872 and 1895, when archeologist Hjalmar Stolpe discovered it in a 9th-century Viking woman's burial. It is made of high-quality silver alloy and is set with a pink-violet oval glass. The ring, preserved at the Swedish history museum, became known as the "Allah ring" because of the pseudo-Kufic inscription found on the ring's glass that resembles the word Allah (Arabic: الله). While other rings were found at the Birka excavations, the "Allah ring" was the only one that had this type of inscription. The Arabic historical linguist Marijn van Putten argued that the inscription on the ring was an example of pseudo-Kufic and that it has no meaning in Arabic. Nevertheless, other analysts extrapolated that the pseudo-Kufic engraving was indeed Arabic and that this was sufficient evidence to directly link Vikings to Islamic civilization. In her Twitter thread on the "Allah” textile, Stephennie Mulder drew on the work of van Putten to argue that like the textile, the ring had been similarly misunderstood. However, she acknowledged that the Arabic language—found on the ring and other objects from Birka—was appreciated by the Vikings as a sign of social status. The inscription could suggest that the ring's owner might have been one of the Viking elites who were in contact with the Islamic world via trade or travel.

=== Dragonhead ===
The Birka dragonhead is a 45mm long decorative object made from a tin alloy. Sven Kalmring and Lena Holmquist maintain that the dragonhead was cast from a soapstone mold due to the presence of casting burs on the object and the fact that similar casting molds of dragons have been found in Birka. Stylistically similar dragonheads have been discovered around the Baltic, and scholars like Anne-Sofie Gräslund believe they likely functioned as dress pins.

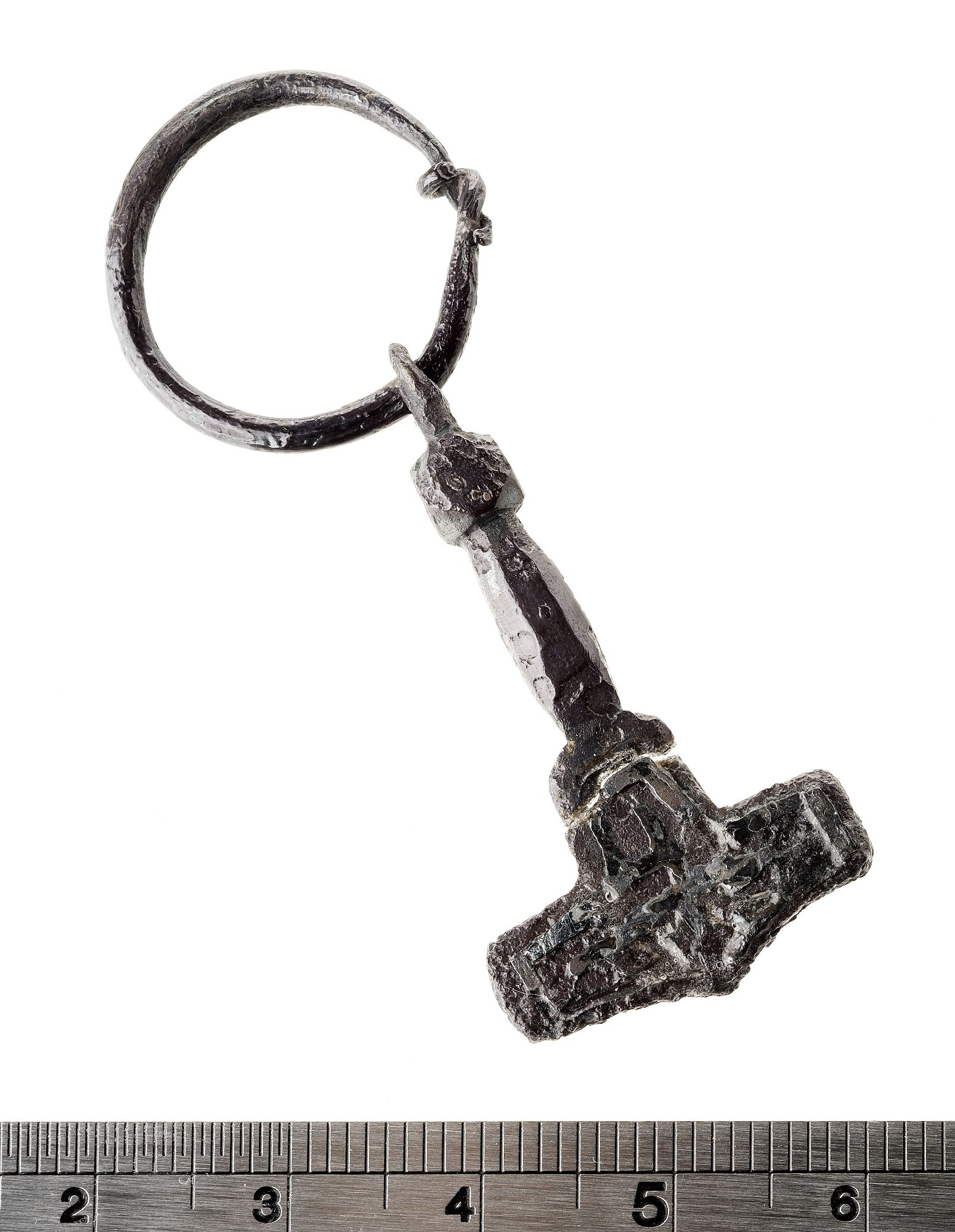
Pendent of Thor's hammer, Mjöllnir, found at Birka

=== Wearable accessories ===
10 small silver crosses were found in graves at Birka. Missionaries, brought by Rimbert and others, led to some converts to Christianity. 27 graves contained small pendants of Thor's hammer from around the 10th century. Both traditional Viking religious beliefs and Christianity were present at Birka.

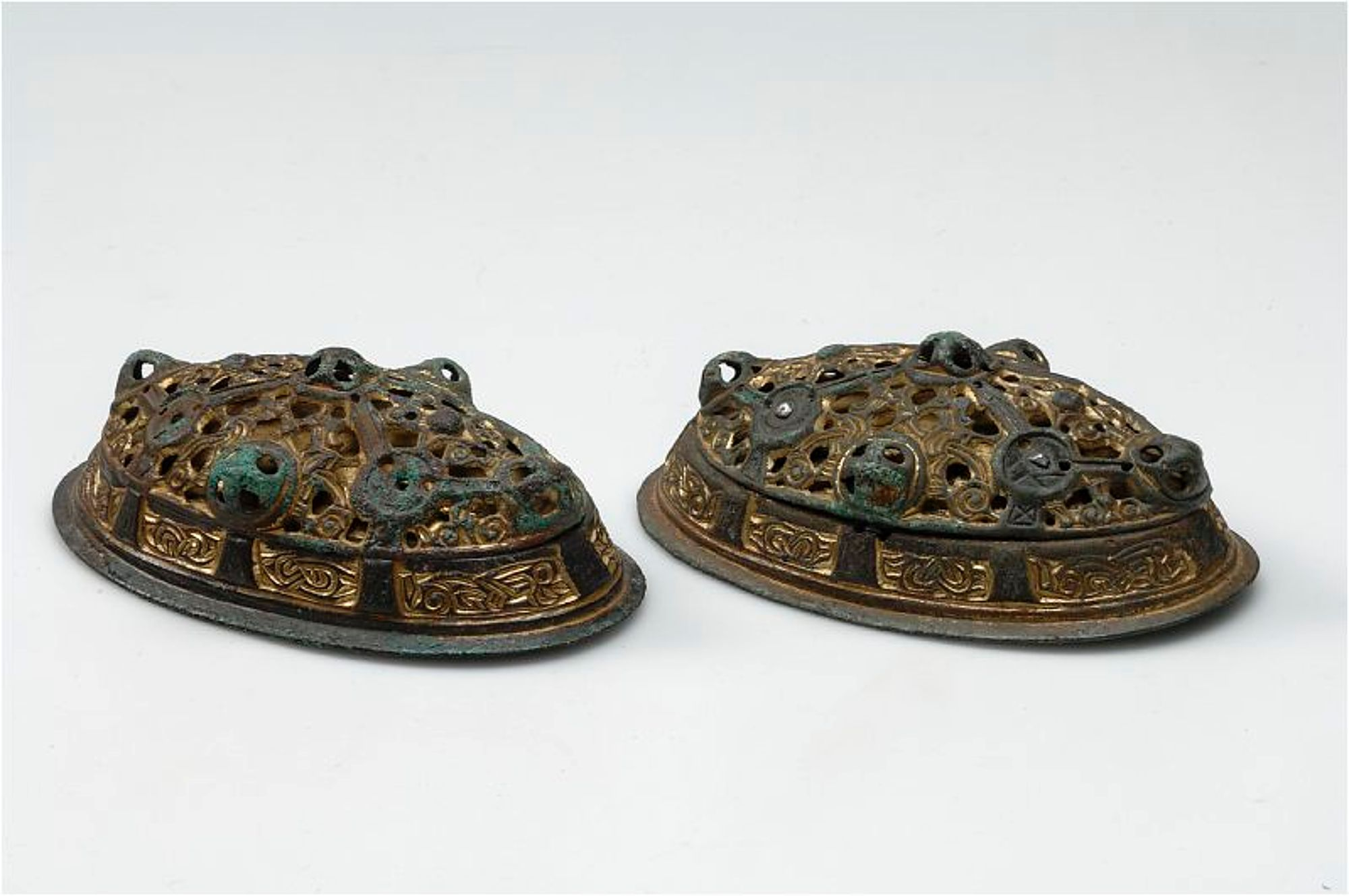
Tortoise brooches found at Birka

Many Birka grave excavations produced a number of funerary findings unique to the deceased and the region of the grave. In the excavation of grave Bj 463, a small copper alloy brooch with animal motifs was found alongside the skeletal remains of a young girl from Birka, and similar ones appeared in other excavations around Birka.

The brooch is understood to be typically related to female burials and also female jewelry of the Viking period. The surrounding fragments of textiles attached to these brooches, scattered around various graves across Sweden, also give an understanding of what the typical womenswear of the Viking age may have been in the 9th and 10th centuries.

=== Dirham coins ===
Dirham coins have been located all around Scandinavian countries and suggest strong trade relations existed between the medieval Middle East and Northern Europe. A dirham coin was found in the excavation of grave sites in Birka, with Arabic writing and an absence of imagery that would date the coin sometime after the 7th century. Other writing on the coin indicates the location of the mint as well as the names of a caliph and an Amir, which place the coin's origins in al-Shah, modern day Tashkent in Uzbekistan. The coin's inscription in Arabic translates into English:

There is no deity but Allah alone he has no equal For God Muhammad is the messenger of God.

== Birka burial sites ==
Over 3,000 grave sites are located in Birka, including both cremations and inhumations in coffins or chamber graves. Skeletal analysis and the presence of gender-specific jewelry and objects in graves has shown that the majority of the deceased are female. Scholar Nancy L. Wicker suggests that the disproportionate number of female graves is due to the fact that female grave goods are easily identifiable, but male graves without objects are difficult to identify.

Many graves contain objects such as coins, glass, and textiles that originated in foreign countries as far as the Middle East and Eastern Asia. According to Nancy L. Wicker, these objects were either imported to Birka as luxury trade goods, or they belonged to foreign individuals who were buried at Birka.

Grave Bj 463 contained the skeleton of a girl from the mid-10th century. She was buried in a coffin with grave goods associated with high-status women, including a round brooch, glass beads, and a needle case. By the condition of her teeth, she was 5–6 years old at the time of her death, and further analysis determined that her diet was similar to that of male warriors instead of a typical child's diet. Scholar Marianne Hem Eriksen maintains that this girl is an unusual case of a high-status child burial, as children were seldom buried with identifiable grave goods.

== See also ==
- List of runestones
- Uppland Runic Inscription 6 on display in Birka's museum
