= Terra Feminarum =

Name for an area in medieval northern Europe

Terra feminarum ("Women's Land") is a name for an area in Medieval Northern Europe that appears in Gesta Hammaburgensis Ecclesiae Pontificum (Deeds of Bishops of the Hamburg Church) by Adam of Bremen 1075 AD, possibly referring to Kvenland.

== Terra Feminarum in Gesta ==
"Woman Land", terra feminarum, appears four times in various chapters of Gesta Hammaburgensis Ecclesiae Pontificum (Deeds of Bishops of the Hamburg Church) by Adam of Bremen in 1075 AD.

"In the meantime Swedes (Sueones), that had expelled their bishop, got a divine revenge. And at first King's son called Anund, whose father had sent him to enlarge his kingdom, after arriving to Woman Land (patriam feminarum), whom we consider to be Amazons, was killed along with his army from poison, that they had mixed to the spring water." (III 15)

"After that come the Swedes (Sueones) that rule wide areas up until Woman Land (terram feminarum). Living east of these are said to be Wizzi, Mirri, Lamiy, Scuti and Turci up until the border of Russia (Ruzziam)." (IV 14)

"Furthermore we have been told that there are many islands in that sea, one of which is called the Great Estland (Aestland) -- And this island is told to be quite close to the Woman Land (terrae feminarum), which is not far away from Birca of the Swedes." (IV 17)

"In this sea there are many other islands, all full of savage barbarians, and that is why navigators avoid them. It is also told that there are Amazons on the coasts of Baltic Sea, which is the reason that they are called Woman Land (terra feminarum)." (IV 19)

There is also "scholia 119" that is marked as an amendment to IV 19. The scholias are not written by Adam himself, but by later copyists.

"When Emund, the King of the Swedes (Sueones), had sent his son Anund to enlarge his powers, he arrived by sea to Woman Land (terram feminarum). The women immediately mixed poison to spring water and this way killed the king and his army. We have mentioned this earlier, and bishop Adalvard himself has assured us that this and the rest as well are true."

== Source of Adam's information ==
Adam had spent some time at the court of the Danish king Svend Estridson where he may have gathered information on northern people and events from various persons and now lost documents.

Adam's information on Woman Land probably originated from a German bishop Adalvard the Younger (as hinted by IV 19's amendment scholia 119) who had been a bishop in Skara and spent time in Norway in the court of king Harald Hårdråde, most probably in the then-capital Trondheim. This would also explain Adam's detailed knowledge about certain parts of Norway, since he mentions Trondheim (Trondemnis) several times (Gesta III 59, IV 16, 32, 33, 34) and even Hålogaland (Halagland) from northern Norway (IV 37). Scritefinnis or Scritefingi (Sami people) are also mentioned several times (IV 24, 25, 31) and usually at the same time when he discusses Norwegians.

== Interpretations ==
The text gives no apparent reason for the name in its literal meaning. Adam and his colleagues themselves seem to have thought the name to derive from the legendary Amazons taken from classical Greek mythology. This is clearly said in the text itself to be their own thinking, even though Adam later in his publication seems to forget that and presents it as a common rumor originating from bishop Adalvard.

The location of Woman Land is not given in exact terms, and several possible locations lie "quite close" to Estonia, reachable "by sea" from Sweden and also "not far" from Birka, and thus fall within Adam's loose words, with one of the possible locations being the small Estonian island of Naissaar, whose name means "women's island".

It has also been suggested that Terra feminarum refers to Kvenland, which Adam would have misinterpreted as "the land of women" due to the similarity between the ethnonym Kvenir and Old Norse word kvæn 'woman'.
