= Birka textiles =

Textiles found during archaeological excavations of Birka, Sweden

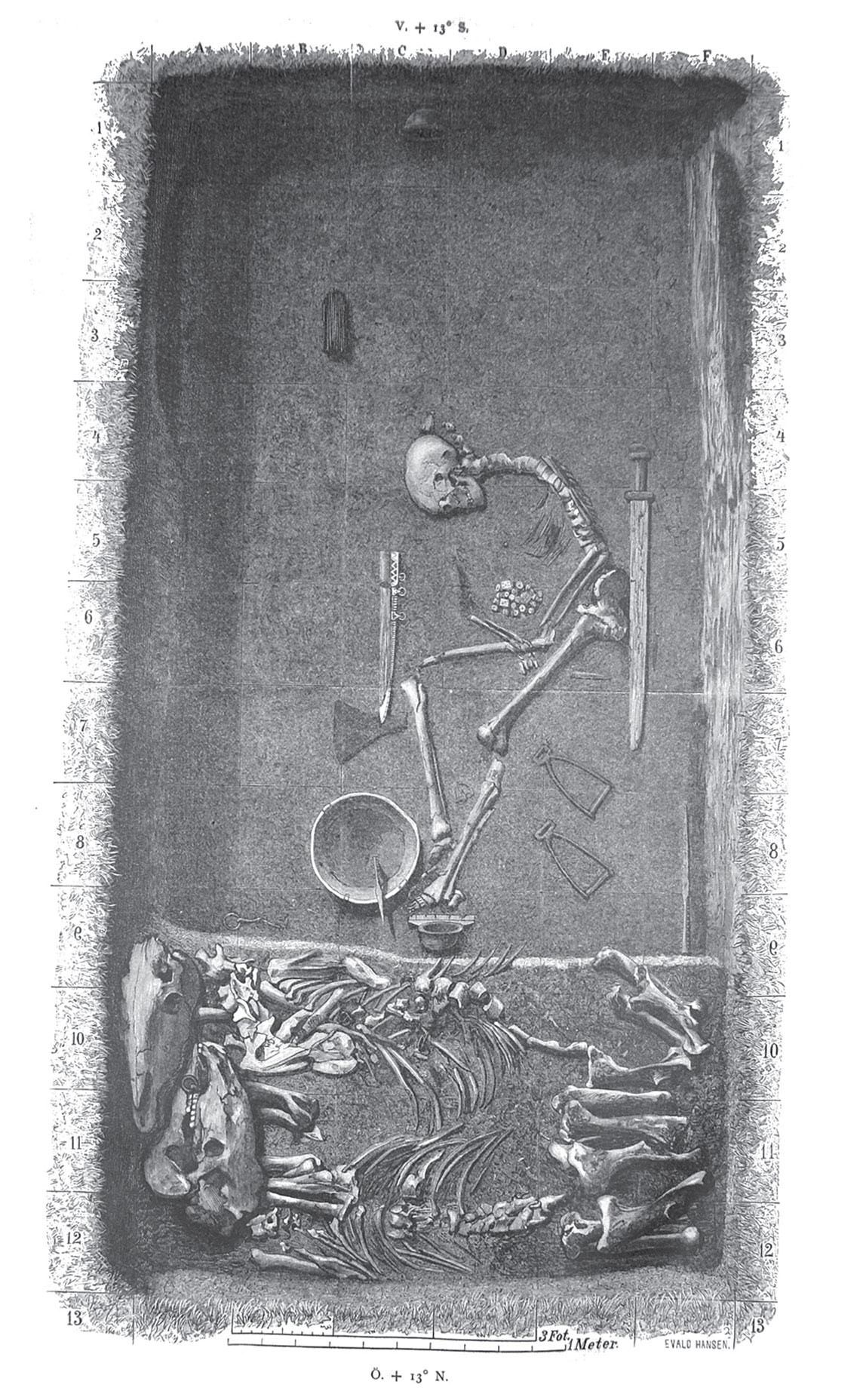
Sketch of archaeological grave found and labelled "Bj581" by Hjalmar Stolpe in Birka, Sweden. Published 1889

The Birka textiles are archaeological textiles found during the excavations of Birka, Sweden conducted between 1871 and 1895 by Hjalmar Stolpe. Around 1100 graves were excavated and among the finds were silver brocade tabletwoven bands, embroideries fashion in gold and silver thread and luxury silk textiles, all dating to the 10th century. The embroidery, mostly worked in stem stitch, includes wool floss on wool fabric, silk floss on silk fabric, and gold thread on a decayed ground material. There are examples of appliqué and edging techniques used to decorate and strengthen garments.

Birka has been called the "Silk Road of the North" from speculation whether the textiles represented Near or Far Eastern origins.

== Background ==
The Byzantine emperor Constantine VII Porphyrogenitus, author of De administrando imperio, wrote of the Dnieper trade route between Novgorod, Smolensk, Chernigov, Vyshegrad and Teliutza to Byzantium, confirming the existence of a trade route between the North and Mediterranean.

Arab writer Ibn Khordadhbeh wrote in the 9th century about Vikings sailing along the Caspian Sea to "Djordjan". They would conduct trades using eunuch interpreters and carry their purchased goods back to Baghdad by camel caravan. And there are other Arab accounts that demonstrate Vikings had access to Arab merchandise. Ibn Fadlan describes a Northern Bulgar settlement on the Volga where he meets with the Rus in 922. According to Fadlan's description of the chieftain's funeral the body of the chieftain, attired in a brocaded caftan, was placed on a Byzantine brocade covered couch in a pavilion that was built on his ship.

There is archaeological evidence for this trade in Sweden where over 60,000 Byzantine coins and Arab Dirhems have been found. There are 2500 rune stones dating between c. 1000-1100 honor men who died in "the Österled (Eastern lands); in Gardarike (Russia), Holmgard (Nogorod), Greece, Miklagard (Byzantium), Jursalia (Jerusalem) and Sarkland (Persia)."

== Tabletwoven bands ==
Tabletwoven bands were found at around 60 of the 170 excavated graves. The warp was woven either entirely of silk, or a combination of silk and an inner material that hasn't survived, and the weft entirely of silk. All the bands were brocaded with metal threads, either of gold or silver, and in two cases a combination. Research by Agnes Geijer identified at least 26 different patterns.

There is controversy about their supposed Eastern origins. Advanced tablet-weaving was known in Nordic countries since before the Viking Age, but these materials and specific constructions are otherwise unknown outside the Birka textiles.
