= Thing of all Geats =

Assembly in medieval Sweden

The Thing of all Geats (Swedish: Alla götars ting) was the thing (general assembly) which was held from pre-historic times to the Middle Ages in Skara, Västergötland. Although its name suggests that it comprised all Geats, it concerned those living in Västergötland and Dalsland, and it is described in the Westrogothic law. According to Ostrogothic law (Östgötalagen), Lionga thing was a similar assembly in Östergötland, held in Linköping in the Middle Ages and somewhere in its vicinity earlier.

All free men living in the legislature and who were able to wield a weapon had the right to participate, and the assembly was led by the lawspeaker.

It had a Swedish counterpart in Gamla Uppsala named the Thing of all Swedes.
