= Uppland Runic Inscription 6 =

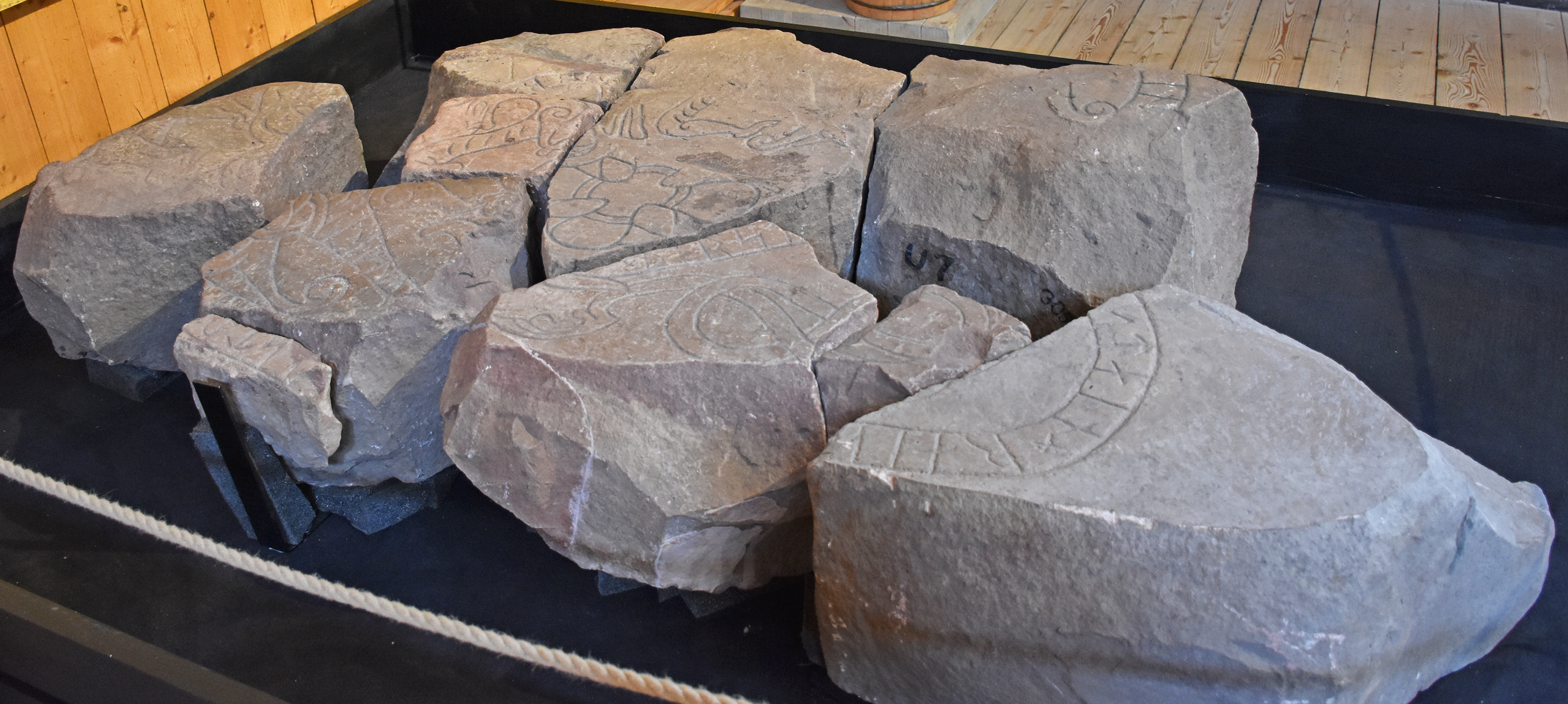
- On display in the Birka Museum
- Material: Red Sandstone
- Created: 725–1100 CE
- Discovered: 1873–2012; Björkö, Adelsö, Uppland, Sweden; 59.32995°N 17.55583°E
- Present location: Birka Museum
- Rundata ID: U 6
- Runemaster: Östen

Translation
- Þorsteinn (and)… -steinn raised… (in memory of) Ástriðr (?)… And in memory of… Eysteinn (?)…

Uppland Runic Inscription 6 (U 6) is the Rundata designation for a runestone that was discovered in several different pieces on the island of Björkö in Stockholm County, Sweden (within the historic province of Uppland). The 10 extant pieces have been placed together and are displayed in the Birka Museum on the island of Björkö.

== Discovery ==
Different fragments of the stone had been found on Björkö for over 100 years. The first fragments were discovered by Hjalmar Stolpe in 1873 and additional pieces were found in 1893, 1992, and 2012. Originally, researchers thought the pieces belonged to several different runestones, but after the most recent find, they were able to piece together all fragments into one stone. Many of the pieces had been used in the construction of local buildings.

Owing to the various discoveries over the years, the miscellaneous finds were originally designated separately as U 6, U 7, U 8, and U Fv 1993:230. The Swedish History Museum has the pieces inventoried as numbers 5208, 30573:1-4, 30574:1-3, and 35206.

== Description ==
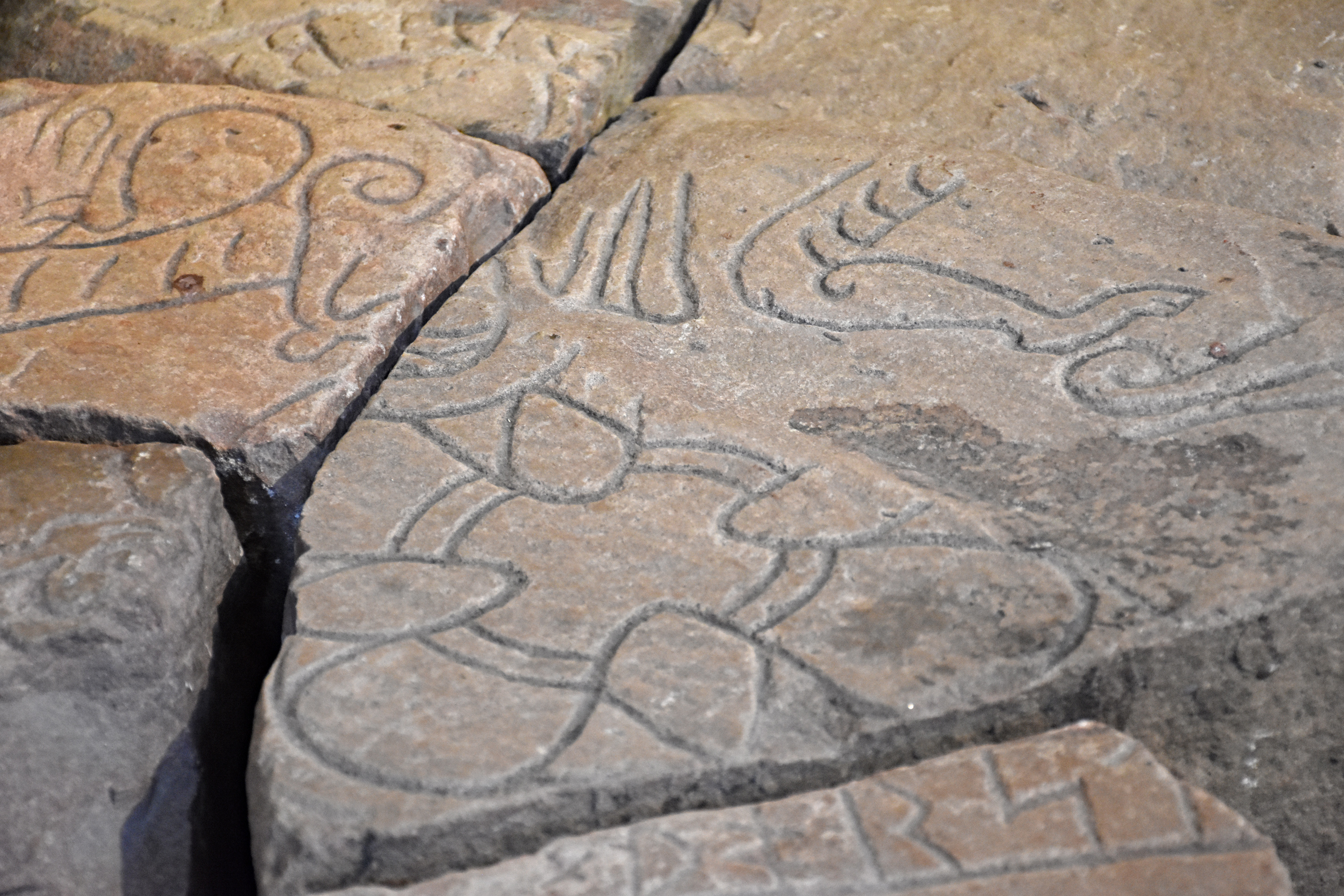
Detail

The stone's design includes two quadrupeds, a rider and a large cross. The runic inscription is badly fragmented, although it is known that at least two people were commemorated. The carving was done by runemaster Östen, who is known for his stones in the Södertälje area.

=== Inscription ===
==== Transliteration of runic text into Latin letters ====
× þorst… … …stain × rais… … -str-- …-… …uk × eftiʀ × ¶ …tunba… × … × a… …ʀ… …ain × …

==== Translation into English ====
Þorsteinn (and)… -steinn raised… (in memory of) Ástriðr (?)… And in memory of… Eysteinn (?)…

== See also ==
- List of runestones
