= Geats =

Northern Germanic people

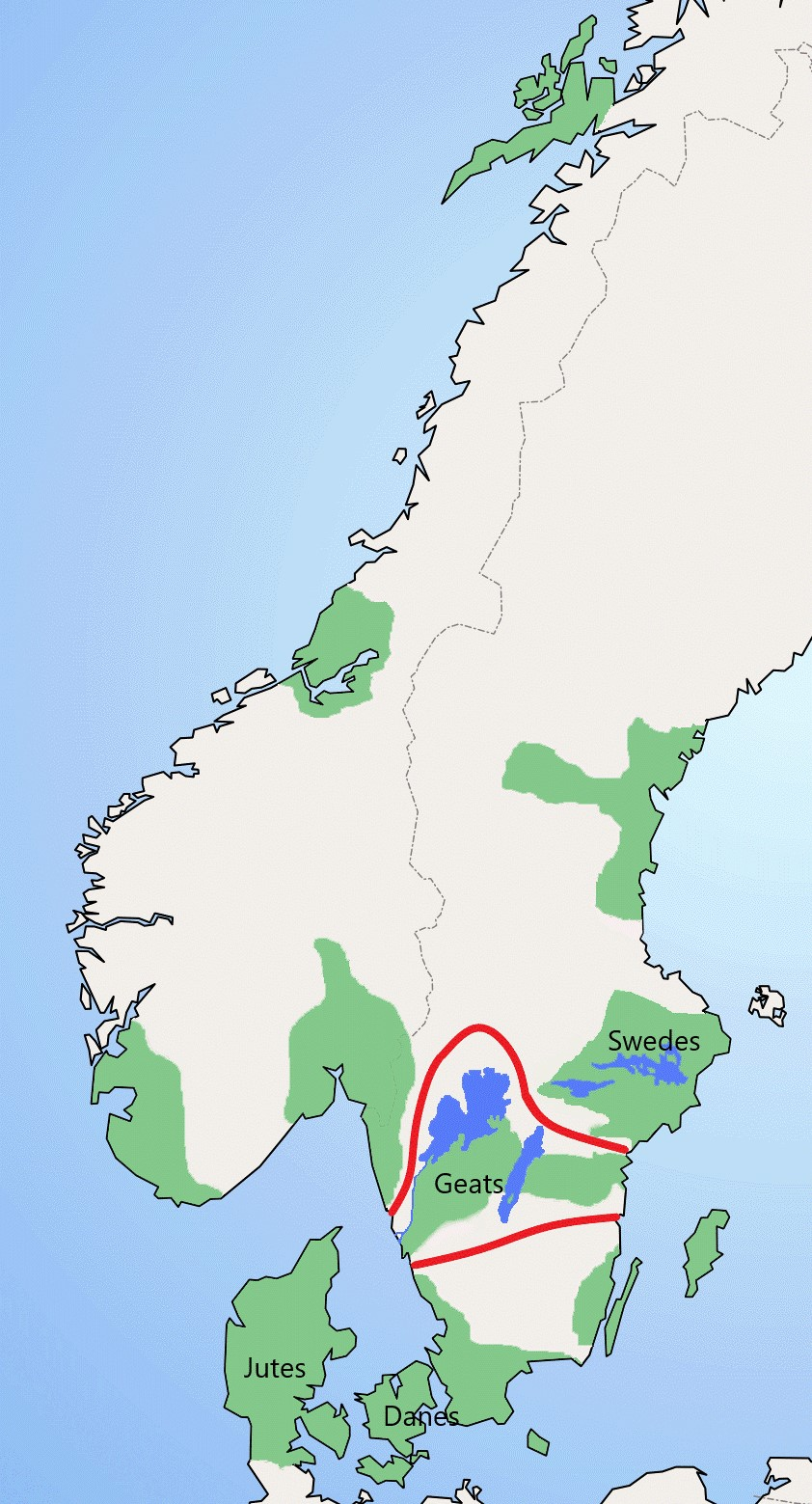
Geatish settlements during the 6th century, within the red lines. The green areas show the main areas of North Germanic settlement in Scandinavia.

The Geats (/ɡiːts, ˈɡeɪəts, jæts/ GHEETS, GAY-əts, YATS (Note: Old English: gēatas [ˈjæɑtɑs] Old Norse: gautar [ˈɡɑu̯tɑr] Swedish: götar [ˈjø̂ːtar])) were a large North Germanic tribe who inhabited Götaland ("land of the Geats") in modern-day southern Sweden from antiquity until the Late Middle Ages. They are one of the progenitor groups of modern Swedes, along with the tribes of Swedes and Gutes. The name of the Geats also lives on in the Swedish provinces of Västergötland and Östergötland, the western and eastern lands of the Geats, and in many other toponyms. The Swedish dialects spoken in the areas that used to be inhabited by Geats form a distinct group, Götamål.

The Geats have often been equated with the Goths of continental Europe, based both on the similarity of the names and the fact that the Goths were said to have originated in Scandinavia. The actual relationship between the two remains unclear.

== Etymology ==
The etymology of the name Geat (Old English Geatas, from a Proto-Germanic *Gautaz, plural *Gautōz) is similar to that of Goths and Gutes (*Gutô, plural *Gutaniz). The names derive from ablaut grades of the Proto-Germanic word *geutaną, meaning "to pour". They may have had the figurative meaning "they who pour their seed". (For more information see Name of the Goths.) The names could also allude to watercourses in the land where they were living, but this is not generally accepted to be the case, partly because that would mean that the names' similarity would be coincidental.

A more specific theory about the word Gautigoths is that it means the Goths who live near the river Gaut, today's Göta älv (Old Norse: Gautelfr). It might also have been a conflation of the word Gauti with a gloss of Goths. In the 17th century the name Göta älv, 'River of the Geats', replaced the earlier names Götälven and Gautelfr. The etymology of the word Gaut (as mentioned above) derives from the Proto-Germanic word *geutan, and the extended meaning of "to pour" is "flow, stream, waterfall", which could refer to Trollhättan Falls or to the river itself.

The short form of Gautigoths was the Old Norse Gautar, which originally referred to just the inhabitants of Västergötland, or the western parts of today's Götaland, a meaning which is retained in some Icelandic sagas.

== History ==
=== Early history ===
Mentions of Geats, Sea-Geats and Wederas in the manuscript of Beowulf

The earliest known surviving mention of the Geats appears in Ptolemy (2nd century AD), who refers to them as Goutai. In the 6th century, Jordanes wrote of the Scandinavian Gautigoth or Gauthigoth, and Ostrogothae in his Getica. Also in the 6th century, Procopius referred to Gautoi in Scandinavia. The Norse Sagas know them as Gautar; Beowulf and Widsith as Gēatas.

Beowulf and the Norse sagas name several Geatish kings, but only Hygelac finds confirmation in Liber Monstrorum where he is referred to as "Rex Getarum" and in a copy of Historiae Francorum where he is called "Rege Gotorum". These sources concern a raid into Frisia in about 516, which is also described in Beowulf. In about 551, some decades after Hygelac's raid, Jordanes described the Geats as a nation which was "bold, and quick to engage in war".

The Anglo-Saxon settlement of Britain included many North Germanic people who were losers in the brutal tribal warfare of Scandinavia. The place-name -gate marks the site of Geatish settlement, often alongside strategically important Roman roads and nearby Visigothic or Jutish settlements. Defeated Jutes like Hengest and his brother Horsa fled to Kent, while Geats defeated by encroaching Swedes moved to Yorkshire where they founded Gillingshire by the Tees, originally the settlement of the Geatlings. It has also been suggested that East Anglia was settled by Geats at this time, or by Wulfings who also came from Götaland, bringing the traditions of Beowulf with them.

Any peace that eventually settled in southern Scandinavia was most likely due to exhaustion, and a Danish archaeologist has summarized that in the mid-6th century, and after, Scandinavia "went down to hell". Scandinavian wares appear to have stopped arriving in England, c. 550, suggesting that contact was broken.

=== Political centralization in Scandinavia ===
According to Procopius there were 13 "very numerous nations" on the Scandinavian peninsula in the 6th century, which is supported by recent archaeological analyses. Several scholars consider this to be a reasonable number of independent kingdoms at the time, with each consisting of one or more tribes, as reported by Jordanes. However, by 1350, these 13 kingdoms had been reduced in number to only two, Norway and Sweden. The Geats were one of the largest tribes.

Procopius and Jordanes both mention the Geats, but after them, foreign sources about Scandinavia are scarce until the 9th century, when Anglo-Saxon and Frankish sources do shed some light on the area. In these, the Geats are absent, which has led some scholars to conclude that they were no longer an independent nation and had been subsumed by the Swedes. Norwegian and Icelandic scaldic sources from the 10th century however indicate that they were still politically independent, sometimes opposing Norwegian kings. It has been suggested that their absence from older sources is instead due to their being an inland people.

The nature and the processes of how Geats and Swedes came to form one kingdom have been much debated among Swedish scholars. The scarcity and sometimes debated veracity of sources has left much room open for interpretation. The oldest medieval Swedish sources present the Swedish kingdom as retaining differences between provinces, in laws as well as in weights and measures. Some scholars have argued that the Geats were subjugated by the Swedes, and have suggested various dates for such an event, from the 6th to the 9th centuries. Others have wanted to see a more gradual merging, and that the Geats were slowly subsumed into the more powerful kingdom of Sweden, and in many respects they maintained their own cultural identity during the Middle Ages. Still others have put emphasis on how it was individual rulers, not ethnic groups, who were driving the process towards a unified kingdom, and that the process was very complicated.

Papal letters from the 1080s style the recipients as "king of the Swedes" or "king of the West Geats". In another papal letter from the 1160s, the title rex Sweorum et Gothorum is first attested. The Swedish kings began the custom of styling themselves as also the kings of the Geats in the 1270s.

=== Dynastic struggles ===
In the 11th century, the Swedish House of Munsö became extinct with the death of Emund the Old. Stenkil, a Geat, was elected king of the Swedes, and the Geats would be influential in the shaping of Sweden as a Christian kingdom. However, this election also ushered in a long period of civil unrest between Christians and pagans and between Geats and Swedes. The Geats tended to be more Christian, and the Swedes more pagan, which was why the Christian Swedish king Inge the Elder fled to Västergötland when deposed in favour of Blot-Sweyn, a king more favourable towards Norse paganism, in the 1080s. Inge would retake the throne and rule until his death c. 1100.

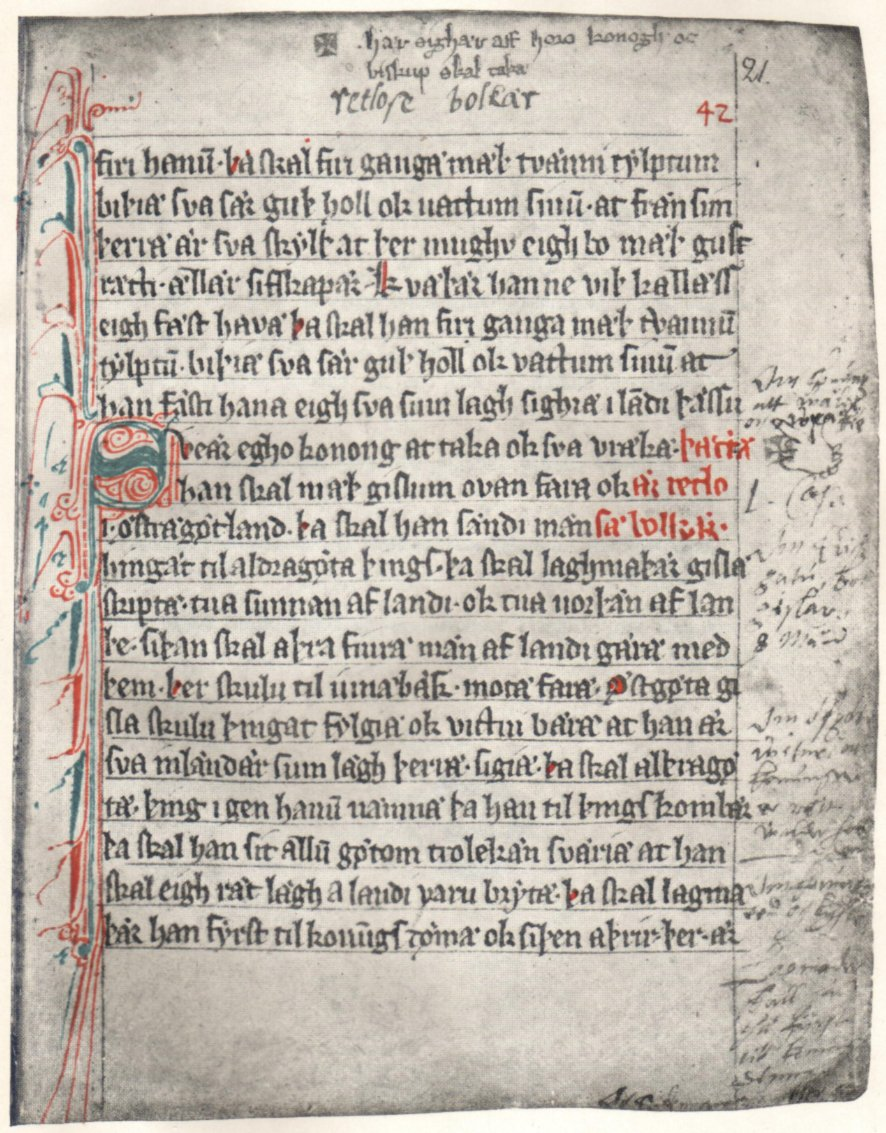
Sveær egho konong at taka ok sva vrækæ and the following sentences in the Westrogothic law

In his Gesta Danorum (book 13), the Danish 12th-century chronicler Saxo Grammaticus noted that the Geats had no say in the election of the king, only the Swedes. When the West Geatish law or Westrogothic law was put to paper, it reminded the Geats that they had to accept the election of the Swedes: Sveær egho konong at taka ok sva vrækæ meaning "It is the Swedes who have the right of choosing ["taking"] and also deposing the king" and then he rode Eriksgatan "mæþ gislum ofvan" – "with hostages from above [the realm]" through Södermanland, the Geatish provinces and then through Närke and Västmanland to be judged to be the lawful king by the lawspeakers of their respective things. One of these Swedish kings was Ragnvald Knaphövde, who in 1125 was riding with his retinue in order to be accepted as king by the different provinces. According to material appended to the oldest manuscript of the Westrogothic law, he decided not to demand hostages as he despised the Geats, and was slain near Falköping.

In a new general law of Sweden that was issued by Magnus Eriksson in the 1350s, it was stated that twelve men from each province, chosen by their things, should be present at the Stone of Mora when a new king was elected.

The distinction between Swedes and Geats lasted during the Middle Ages, but the Geats became increasingly important for Swedish national claims of greatness due to the Geats' old connection with the Goths. They argued that since the Goths and the Geats were the same nation, and the Geats were part of the kingdom of Sweden, this meant that the Swedes had defeated the Roman empire. The earliest attestation of this claim comes from the Council of Basel, 1434, during which the Swedish delegation argued with the Spanish about who among them were the true Goths. The Spaniards argued that it was better to be descended from the heroic Visigoths than from stay-at-homers. This cultural movement, which was not restricted to Sweden went by the name Gothicismus or in Swedish Göticism, i.e. Geaticism.

After the 15th century and the Kalmar Union, the Swedes and the Geats appear to have begun to perceive themselves as one nation, which is reflected in the evolution of svensk into a common ethnonym. It was originally an adjective referring to those belonging to the Swedish tribe, who are called svear in Swedish. As early as the 9th century, svear had been vague, both referring to the Swedish tribe and being a collective term including the Geats, and this is the case in Adam of Bremen's work where the Geats (Goths) appear both as a proper nation and as part of the Sueones. The merging/assimilation of the two nations took a long time, however. In the early-20th century, Nordisk familjebok noted that svensk had almost replaced svear as a name for the Swedish people.

At the same time, the Swedish ancestors were often referred to as Geats, especially when their heroism or connection to the Goths was to be stressed. This practice disappeared during the 19th century, when the vikings gradually took over the role as the heroic ancestors.

== Society ==
The Geats were traditionally divided into several petty kingdoms, or districts, which had their own things (popular assemblies) and laws. The largest one of these districts was Västergötland (West Geatland), and it was in Västergötland that the Thing of all Geats was held every year, in the vicinity of Skara. Despite the name, the thing was only for the inhabitants of Västergötland and Dalsland. The equivalent in Östergötland was Lionga thing.

Unlike the Swedes, who used the division hundare, the Geats used hærrad (modern Swedish härad), like the Norwegians and the Danes. Surprisingly, it would be the Geatish name that became the common term in the Swedish kingdom. This is possibly related to the fact that several of the medieval Swedish kings were of Geatish extraction and often resided primarily in Götaland. In Västergötland and Dalsland, there were also a higher-level division where one or more hærrad made up a bo linked to a kongsgård.

== Modern legacy ==
Today, the merger of the two nations is complete, as there is no longer any tangible identification in Götaland with a Geatish identity, apart from the common tendency of residents of the provinces of Västergötland and Östergötland to refer to themselves as västgötar (West Geats) and östgötar (East Geats), similarly to how residents of other provinces refer to themselves. The dialects spoken in those provinces and some surrounding areas are also collectively called götamål. Although the city Göteborg (Gothenburg) has formerly been considered to have been named after the river Göta älv, it may instead have been named after the Geats ('fortress of the Geats') when it was founded in 1621.

Until 1973 the official title of the Swedish king was "King of Sweden (earlier: of the Swedes), the Geats/Goths and the Wends" (with the formula Sveriges, Götes och Vendes konung, in Latin N.N. Dei Gratia, Suecorum, Gothorum et Vandalorum Rex). The title "King of the Wends" was copied from the Danish title, where Wends referred to Slavic peoples who inhabited large areas of modern east Germany and Pomerania before the Ostsiedlung, the eastern expansion of Germanic peoples. The Danish kings also called themselves "Kings of the Goths", but in their case Goths referred to Gotland instead of Götaland.

The titles, however, changed in 1973 when the new king Carl XVI Gustaf decided that his royal title should simply be "King of Sweden". The disappearance of the old title was his decision alone.

== Goths ==
Traditional Götaland The island of Gotland Wielbark culture, in the early 3rd century Chernyakhov culture, in the early 4th century Roman Empire at its greatest extent, 117 AD

Geatas was originally Proto-Germanic *Gautoz and Goths and Gutar (Gotlanders) were *Gutaniz. *Gautoz and *Gutaniz are two ablaut grades of a Proto-Germanic word *geutan with the meaning "to pour" (modern Swedish gjuta, modern German gießen). The word comes from an Indo-European root meaning to pour, offer sacrifice. There were consequently two derivations from the same Proto-Germanic ethnonym.

It is a long-standing controversy whether the Goths were Geats. Both Old Icelandic and Old English literary sources clearly separate the Geats (Isl. Gautar, OEng Geatas) from the Goths/Gutar (Isl. Gotar, OEng. Gotenas); but the Gothic historian Jordanes wrote that the Goths came originally to Dacia from the island of Scandza. Moreover, he described that on this island there were three tribes called the Gautigoths (cf. Geat/Gaut), the Ostrogoths (cf. the Swedish province of Östergötland) and Vagoths (Gutar?) ‒ this implies that the Geats were Goths rather than vice versa. The word Goth is also a term used by the Romans to describe related, culturally linked tribes like the Tervingi and the Greuthungs, so it may be correct to label Geats as Goths.

Scandinavian burial customs, such as the stone circles (domarringar), which are most common in Götaland and Gotland, and stelae (bautastenar) appeared in what is now northern Poland in the 1st century AD, suggesting an influx of Scandinavians during the formation of the Gothic Wielbark culture. Moreover, in Östergötland, in Sweden, there is a sudden disappearance of villages during this period. Contemporary accounts beginning in the fourth century further associated these groups with the earlier Getae of Dacia, but this is now disputed.

== Fringe theories ==
=== Götaland theory ===
The Götaland theory (Swedish "Västgötaskolan") is a disparate group of theories, which have attempted to prove that some events and even places that are traditionally placed around Mälaren, especially ones that are associated with the formation of medieval Sweden, instead should be located to Västergötland. The methods ranged from relatively scholarly efforts to dowsing. This "school" was brought to prominence in the 1980s following a TV series by Dag Stålsjö. While some serious scholars have attempted to place more emphasis on the Geats in the early history of Sweden than was traditional, Västgötaskolan has never reached any acceptance.

=== Identity of the Gēatas ===
The generally accepted identification of Old English Gēatas as the same ethnonym as Swedish götar and Old Norse gautar is based on the observation that the ö monophthong of modern Swedish and the au diphthong of Old Norse correspond to the ēa diphthong of Old English.

Correspondences
Old Norse	Swedish	Old English	Modern English
brauð	bröd	brēad	bread
laukr	lök	lēac	onion, cf. leek
lauf	löv	lēaf	leaf
austr	öst	ēast	east
draumr	dröm	drēam	dream
dauðr	död	dēað	death
rauðr	röd	rēad	red

Thus, Gēatas is the Old English form of Old Norse Gautar and modern Swedish Götar. This correspondence seems to tip the balance for most scholars. It is also based on the fact that in Beowulf, the Gēatas live east of the Dani (across the sea) and in close contact with the Sweon, which fits the historical position of the Geats between the Danes and the Swedes. Moreover, the story of Beowulf, who leaves Geatland and arrives at the Danish court after a naval voyage, where he kills a beast, finds a parallel in Hrólf Kraki's saga. In this saga, Bödvar Bjarki leaves Gautland and arrives at the Danish court after a naval voyage and kills a beast that has been terrorizing the Danes for two years (see also Origins for Beowulf and Hrólf Kraki).

==== Jutish hypothesis ====
There is a hypothesis that the Jutes also were Geats, and which was proposed by Pontus Fahlbeck in 1884. According to this hypothesis the Geats would have not only resided in southern Sweden but also in Jutland, where Beowulf would have lived.

The Geats and the Jutes are mentioned in Beowulf as different tribes, and whereas the Geats are called gēatas, the Jutes are called ēotena (genitive) or ēotenum (dative). Moreover, the Old English poem Widsith also mentions both Geats and Jutes, and it calls the latter ȳtum. However, Fahlbeck proposed in 1884 that the Gēatas of Beowulf referred to Jutes and he proposed that the Jutes originally also were Geats like those of southern Sweden. This theory was based on an Old English translation of Venerable Bede's Ecclesiastical History of the English People attributed to Alfred the Great where the Jutes (iutarum, iutis) once are rendered as gēata (genitive) and twice as gēatum (dative) (see e.g. the OED which identifies the Geats through Eotas, Iótas, Iútan and Geátas). Fahlbeck did not, however, propose an etymology for how the two ethnonyms could be related.

Fahlbeck's theory was refuted by Schück who in 1907 noted that another Old English source, the Anglo-Saxon Chronicle, called the Jutes īutna, īotum or īutum. Moreover, Schück pointed out that when Alfred the Great's translation mentions the Jutes for the second time (book IV, ch. 14(16)) it calls them ēota and in one manuscript ȳtena. Björkman proposed in 1908 that Alfred the Great's translation of Jutes as Geats was based on a confusion between the West Saxon form Geotas ("Jutes") and Gēatas ("Geats").

As for the origins of the ethnonym Jute, it may be a secondary formation of the toponym Jutland, where jut is derived from a Proto-Indo-European root *eud meaning "water".

==== Gutnish hypothesis ====
Since the 19th century, there has also been a suggestion that Beowulf's people were Gutes (from the island of Gotland in Sweden). According to the poem, the weather-geats or sea-geats, as they are called are supposed to have lived east of the Danes/Dacians and be separated from the Swedes by wide waters. Some researchers have found it a little far-fetched that wide waters relates to Vänern in Västergötland or Mälaren. The weather in weather-geats, and sea-geats marks a people living at a windy, stormy coast by the sea. The Geats of Västergötland were historically an inland people, making an epithet such as weather- or sea- a little strange. Moreover, when Beowulf dies he is buried in a mound at a place called Hrones-naesse, meaning "the cape of whales". Whales have for obvious reasons never lived in Vänern, where, according to Birger Nerman, Beowulf is buried. However, an expanse of water separates the island of Gotland from the Swedes. The island lies east of Denmark/Dacia and whales were once common in the Baltic Sea where Gotland is situated. The name of the Gutes in Swedish, Gutar, is an ablaut-grade of the same name as that of the Geats in Beowulf. These facts made the archaeologist Gad Rausing come to the conclusion that the weather-Geats may have been Gutes. This was supported by another Swedish archaeologist Bo Gräslund. According to Rausing, Beowulf may be buried in a place called Rone on Gotland, a name corresponding to the Hrones in Hrones-naesse. Not far from there lies a place called Arnkull corresponding to the Earnar-naesse in Beowulf, which according to the poem was situated closely to Hrones-naesse.

This theory does not exclude the ancient population of Västergötland and Östergötland from being Geats, but rather holds that the Anglo-Saxon name Geat could refer to West-geats (Västergötland), East-geats (Östergötland) as well as weather-geats (Gotland), in accordance with Jordanes account of the Scandinanian tribes Gautigoth, Ostrogoth and Vagoth.

== See also ==
- Blenda
- Geatish Society
- Göta
- Götavirke (Geatish Dyke)
- Varangian
