= Östgötalagen =

Medieval (13th-c.) Swedish provincial law

The Östgötalagen was a medieval provincial law-code for Östergötland and the Småland lands of Kinda (which also included Ydre härad), Vedbo, Tjust and several smaller areas, as well as Öland, an area known as the Östgöta lagsaga. The law-code was associated with assemblies called Lionga thing.

The preserved record clearly relates to the lawspeakers' orally transmitted laws and is considered to have been written down around 1290.

The Östgötalagen were first printed by Hans Samuel Collin and Carl Johan Schlyter in 1830. A modernized Swedish interpretation with comments was published in 1933 by Åke Holmbäck and Elias Wessén.
