= Adalvard =

Adalvard is the name of two clergymen who were active in Sweden during its Christianization in the 11th century.

- Adalvard the Elder (died c. 1064), bishop of Skara
- Adalvard the Younger (died b. 1072), his successor in Skara
