= Hjalmar Stolpe =

Swedish academic

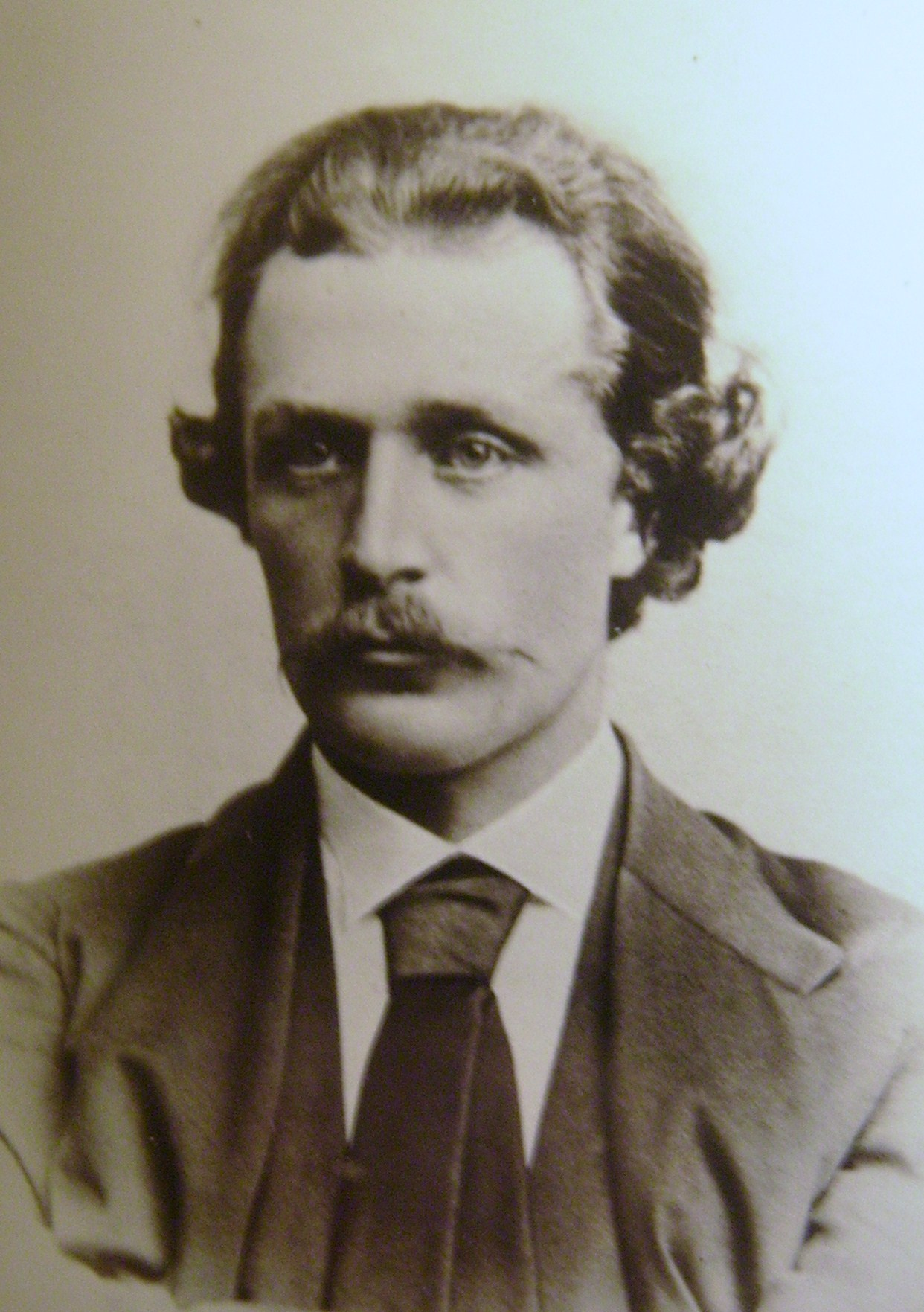
- Born: 23 April 1841; Gävle, Sweden
- Died: 27 January 1905 (aged 63); Stockholm, Sweden
- Resting place: Solna cemetery
- Education: Uppsala University
- Scientific career
- Fields: Entomology, archeology, ethnography

Knut Hjalmar Stolpe (23 April 1841 – 27 January 1905), was a Swedish entomologist, archaeologist, and ethnographer. He was the first director and curator of the Museum of Ethnography, Sweden. He is best known for his meticulous archaeological excavations at the Viking-age site Birka on the island Björkö.

== Biography ==
Hjalmar Stolpe was born at Gävle in Gävleborg County, Sweden. He was the son of Carl Johan Stolpe, the mayor of Norrköping, and Katarina Vilhelmina Charlotta Eckhoff.

He graduated from Uppsala University in 1860 with a degree in zoology and botany and obtained a PhD in 1872. He worked at the Swedish History Museum during the years 1874–1900. Over a period of twenty years, he carried out large excavations at Birka on Björkö where there are burial mounds dating from the Bronze Age. One of the graves he documented was the so called Birka female Viking warrior (Birka chamber grave Bj 581) with weapons in a 10th-century chamber-grave. However, it is in doubt if the woman inside was actually a warrior, solely based on the findings in the grave, as osteoarcheological testings did not find any war-related injuries inflicted on the woman during her lifetime.

In 1883–1885 he took part in the Vanadis expedition which sailed around the world with the frigate Vanadis visiting South America, Oceania, Asia, and Europe. During land excursions, Stolpe collected 7500 cultural specimens for an intended ethnographical museum in Sweden. In 1900, an ethnographic department was established at Swedish Museum of Natural History (now the Museum of Ethnography, Sweden (Etnografiska museet). Hjalmar Stolpe became the ethnographic unit's first director. In 1903 he was appointed curator and professor.

== Personal life ==
From 1875 he was married to Emmy Holmgren (1841 - 1905). He died in 1905 in Stockholm.

== Gallery ==
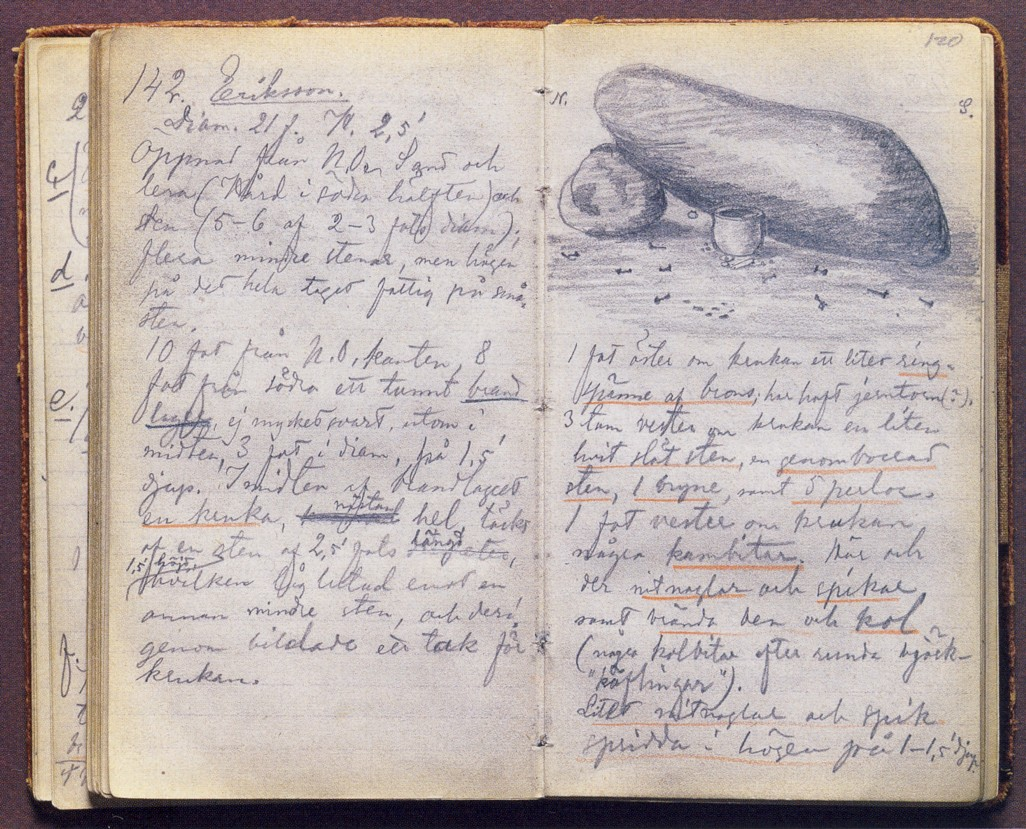
Sketch from Stolpe's diary about Birka in 1875

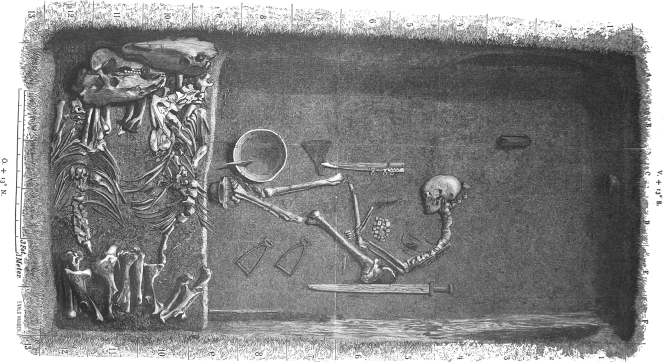
Sketch from his diary published in 1889 about the Bj 581 gravesite

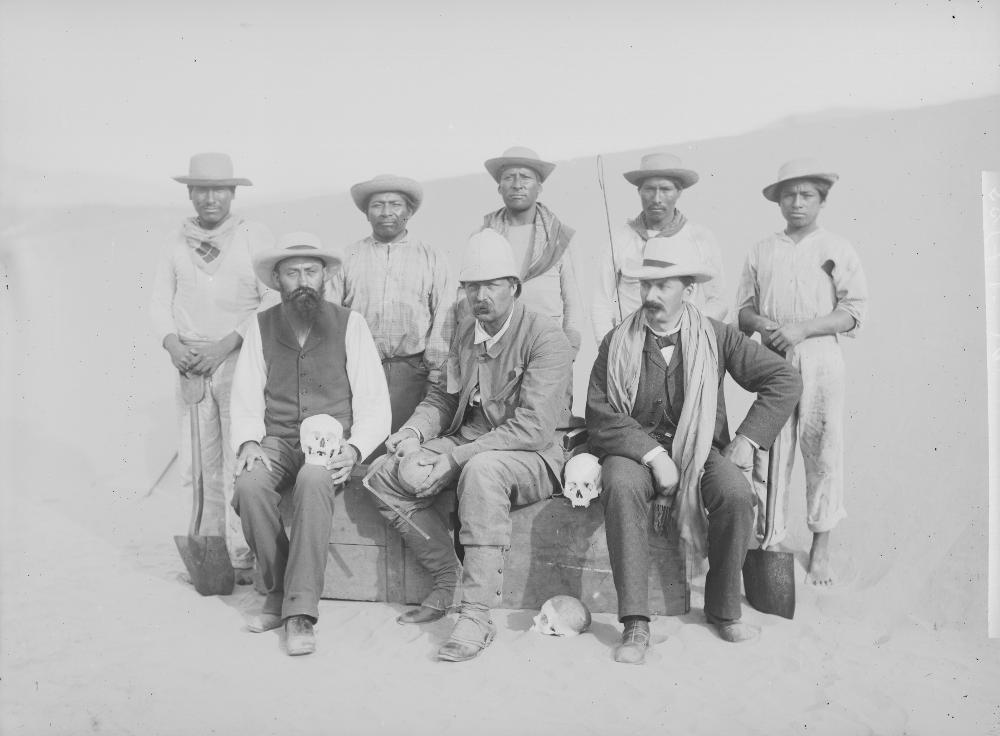
Hjalmar Stolpe during the Vanadise Expedition at Ancón, Peru, 1884

== Publications ==
- Stolpe, Hjalmar & Arne, Ture Algot Johnsson (1912). Graffältet vid Vendel (original, Swedish ed.). Stockholm, SE: K.L. Beckmans Boktryckeri.
- Stolpe, Hjalmar & Arne, Ture Algot Johnsson (1927). La Nécropole De Vendel (French trans. ed.). Stockholm, SE: Akademiens Förlag. (French edition of Stolpe & Arne 1912)

== Other sources ==
- Erikson, Bo G. (2015) Kungen av Birka: Hjalmar Stolpe arkeolog och etnograf. Andra upplagan (Stockholm: Atlantis) ISBN 9789173538411
- Erikson, Bo G. (2020) Expedition Vanadis : en etnografisk världsomsegling 1883-1885 (Stockholm: Bokförlaget Stolpe) ISBN 9789189069015

== Related reading ==
- Harrison, Dick; Kristina Svensson (2007) Vikingaliv (Stockholm : Natur och Kultur) ISBN 9789127152762
