= Agnes Geijer =

Swedish textile historian and archaeologist (1898–1989)

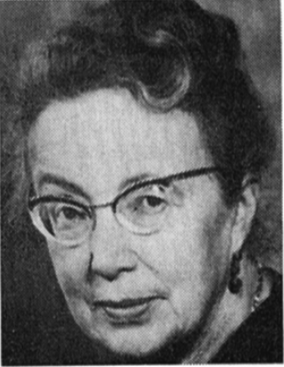
- Born: 26 October 1898; Uppsala Cathedral Assembly
- Died: 17 July 1989; Hedvig Eleonora and Oscar Parish
- Resting place: Uppsala Old Cemetery
- Education: Uppsala University
- Employer: Swedish National Heritage Board
- Father: Karl Reinhold Geijer

Agnes Teresa Geijer (26 October 1898 – 17 July 1989) was a Swedish textile historian and archaeologist.

== Life ==
Geijer became the head of the textile conservation atelier Pietas in 1930. She received a doctoral degree from Uppsala University in 1938, and became employed at the Swedish History Museum in 1941. She was active there from 1947 as a textile conservator.

Geijer died in 1989. A foundation in her name awards grants and scholarships to students of the history of textiles from eight Nordic countries.

== Works translated into English ==
- The Conservation of Flags in Sweden, 1957
- A History of Textile Art (revised translated by Roger Tanner), 1979 ISBN 0-85667-055-3
- Oriental Textiles in Sweden, 1951
- Textile Treasures of Uppsala Cathedral: From Eight Centuries, 1964
- The Viminacium Gold Tapestry: A Unique Textile Fragment from Hungary (edited by B. Thomas), 1964
- Studies in Textile History: In Memory of Harold B. Burnham (edited by Veronika Gervers), 1977 ISBN 0-88854-192-9
