= Thing (assembly) =

Governing assembly of early Germanic societies

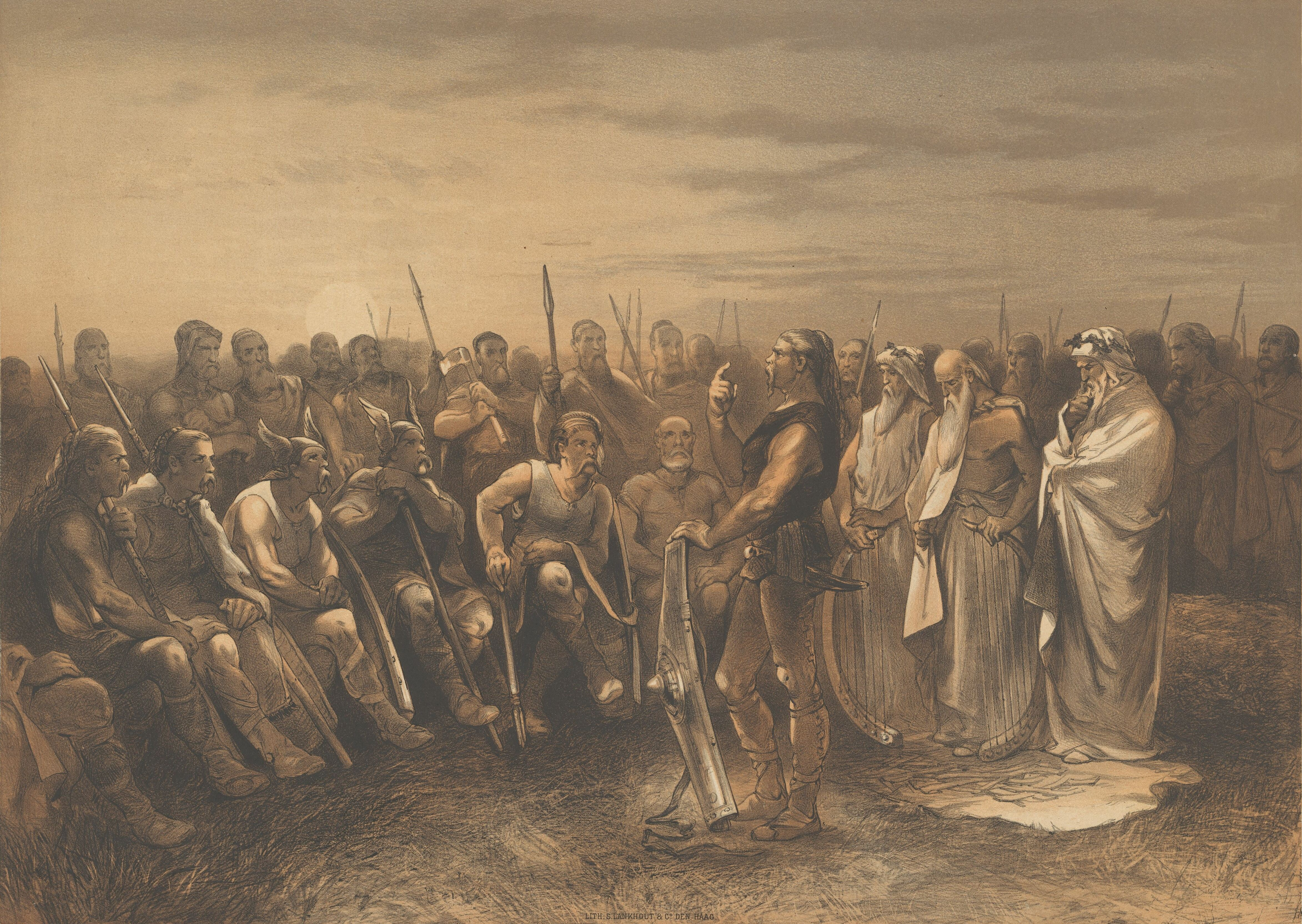
A Germanic assembly, by Charles Rochussen

A thing, (Note: Icelandic: þing; German: Ding; Old English: þing; Middle English: thing.) also known as a folkmoot, assembly, tribal council, and by other names, was a governing assembly in early Germanic societies, made up of the free people of the community, and presided over by a lawspeaker. Things took place regularly, usually at prominent places accessible by travel. They provided legislative functions, as well as social events and trade opportunities. In modern usage, the meaning of this word in English and other languages has shifted to mean not just an assemblage of some sort but also simply an object of any kind. Thingstead (Old English: þingstede) or thingstow (Old English: þingstōw) is the English term for the location where a thing was held.

== Etymology ==
The word appears in Old Norse, Old English, and modern Icelandic as þing, (Note: In þing, þ is pronounced as unvoiced "th" /θ/.) in Middle English (as in modern English), Old Saxon, Old Dutch, and Old Frisian as thing (the difference between þing and thing is purely orthographical), in German as Ding, in Dutch and Afrikaans as ding, and in modern Norwegian, Danish, Swedish, Faroese, Gutnish, and Norn as ting. The place where a thing was held was called a thingstead or thingstow. An alternative Proto-Germanic form of the word thing was *þingsō, whence Gothic þeihs time. All of these terms derive from *þingą meaning "appointed time," possibly originating in Proto-Indo-European *ten-, "stretch," as in a "stretch of time for an assembly".

In English, the term is attested from 685 to 686 in the older meaning "assembly"; later, it referred to a being, entity or matter (sometime before 899), and then also an act, deed, or event (from about 1000). The original sense of "meeting, assembly" did not survive the shift to Middle English. The meaning of personal possessions, commonly in the plural, first appears in Middle English around 1300, and eventually led to the modern sense of "object". This semantic development from "assembly" to "object" is mirrored in the evolution of the Latin causa ("judicial lawsuit", "case") to modern French chose, Spanish/Italian/Catalan cosa, and Portuguese coisa (all meaning "object" or "thing") and the cognate to English sake (purpose), sak in Norwegian and Swedish, sag in Danish, zaak in Dutch, saak in Afrikaans, and Sache in German, which in languages like Old Norse meant "accusation, lawsuit," but today also carries the sense "thing, object".

Today the term lives on in the English term hustings and in the names of national legislatures and political and judicial institutions of some Nordic countries (e.g. the Icelandic parliament, the Alþing and the Norwegian parliament, the Storting) and the Isle of Man (the Tynwald).

== Early attestations ==
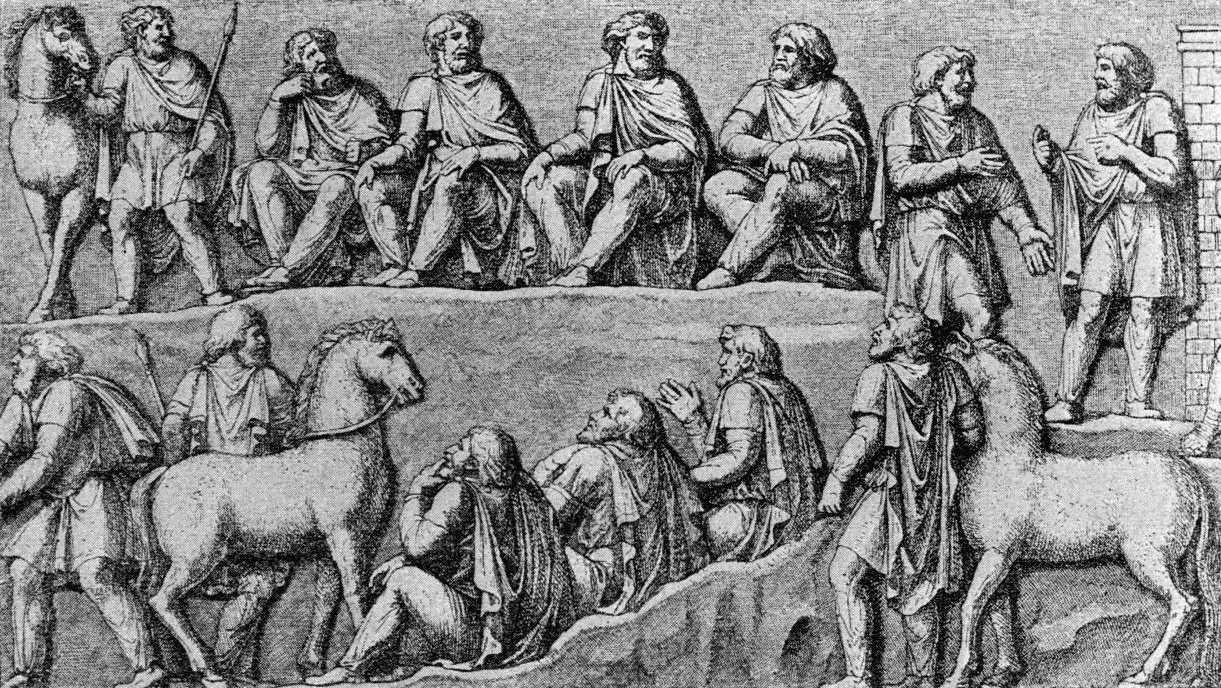
Germanic thing, drawn after the depiction in a relief of the Column of Marcus Aurelius in Rome (193 CE)

The first detailed description of a thing was made by Tacitus in 98 CE. Tacitus suggested that the things were annual delegate-based meetings that served legal and military functions.

The oldest written reference to a thing is on a stone pillar found along Hadrian's Wall at Housesteads Roman Fort in Northumberland in the United Kingdom. It is dated 43–410 CE and reads:

DEO MARTI THINCSO ET DUABUS ALAISIAGIS BEDE ET FIMMILENE ET N AUG GERM CIVES TUIHANTI VSLM

To the god Mars Thincsus and the two Alaisiagae, Beda and Fimmilena, and to the Divinity of the Emperor the Germanics, being tribesmen of Tuihanti, willingly and deservedly fulfilled their vow.

The pillar was raised by a Frisian auxiliary unit of the Roman army deployed at Hadrian's Wall. The name Tuihanti refers to the current region Twente, which is in the east of the Netherlands. However, these Tuihanti tribesmen have been interpreted by different historians as Frisians. Deo Mars Thincsus means 'god Mars of the Thing'. "Mars of the Thing" may be interpreted in analogy with the week-day name (the Germanic Tuesday corresponding to Latin Martis dies 'the day of Mars'; cf. Interpretatio germanica) as Tīwaz of the Thing. The god Tīwaz (Old English Tíw, Old Norse Týr) was likely important in early Germanic times and has numerous places in England and Denmark named after him. The possible theonyms Beda and Fimmilena in the same inscription relate to the bodthing and fimelthing, two specific types of assemblies were recorded in Old Frisian codices from around 1100 onward. Perhaps the distinction was that the fixed thing was protected by the god Thincsus, the extraordinary thing by Beda, and the informative or non-decision-making thing by Fimmilena.

The Anglo-Saxon folkmoot (Old English: folcgemōt; Middle English: folkesmōt; Norwegian: folkemøte) was analogous, the forerunner to the witenagemōt "royal council" and a precursor of the modern Parliament of the United Kingdom.

== Use in Germanic society ==
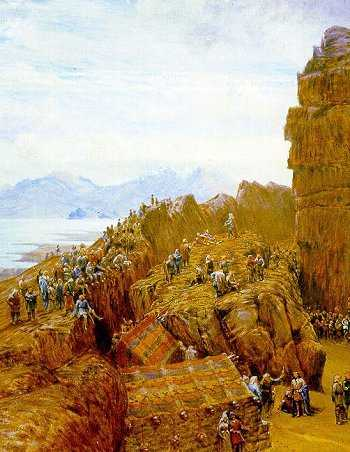
The Icelandic Althing in session, as imagined in the 1890s by British artist W. G. Collingwood

In the Viking Age, things were the public assemblies of the free men of a country, province, or a hundred (Swedish: härad, hundare, Danish: herred). They functioned as parliaments and courts at different levels of society—local, regional, and supra-regional. Their purpose was to solve disputes and make political decisions, and thingsteads were often places for public religious rites. According to Norway's Law of the Gulating, only free men of full age could participate in the assembly. According to written sources, women were present at some things despite being left out of decision-making bodies, such as the Icelandic Althing.

For prechristian Norse clans, the members of a clan were obliged to avenge injuries against their dead and mutilated relatives. As a result, feuding is often seen as the most common form of conflict resolution used in Viking society. However, things are in a more general sense, balancing structures used to reduce tribal feuds and avoid social disorder in North Germanic cultures. They played an essential role in Viking society as forums for conflict resolution, marriage alliances, power display, honor, and inheritance settlements.

In Sweden, assemblies were held at natural and man-made mounds, often burial mounds. Specifically in Scandinavia, unusually large runestones and inscriptions suggesting a local family's attempt to claim supremacy are standard features of thingsteads. It is common for assembly sites close to communication routes, such as navigable water routes and clear land routes.

The thing met at regular intervals, legislated, elected chieftains and kings and judged according to the law, which was memorised and recited by the lawspeaker (judge). The thing's negotiations were presided over by the lawspeaker and the chieftain or the king. Current scholarly discussions centre around the things being forerunners to democratic institutions that are known today. The Icelandic Althing is considered to be the oldest surviving parliament in the world, the Norwegian Gulating also dating back to 900–1300. While the things were not democratic assemblies in the modern sense of an elected body, they were built around ideas of neutrality and representation, effectively representing the interests of larger numbers of people. In Norway, the thing was a space where free men and elected officials met and discussed matters of collective interest, such as taxation. Though some scholars say that the things were dominated by the most influential members of the community, the heads of clans and wealthy families, other scholars describe how every free man could put forward his case for deliberation and share his opinions. History professor Torgrim Titlestad describes how Norway, with the thing sites, displayed an advanced political system over a thousand years ago, one that was characterized by high participation and democratic ideologies. These things also served as courts of law, and if one of the smaller things could not reach agreement, the matter at hand would be brought to one of the bigger things, which encompassed larger areas. The legislature of Norway is still known as the Storting (Big Thing) today.

Towards the end of the Viking Age, royal power became centralized, and the kings consolidated power and control over assemblies. As a result, things lost most of their political role and began to function mainly as courts in the later Middle Ages.

=== Norway ===
In the period between the eleventh and fourteenth centuries, Norway went through a state-formation process that elevated the control and power of the king. On the regional level, it has been assumed that the king would have taken control of the organization of assemblies via local representatives. Today, few thingsteads from Norway are known for sure, and as new assembly sites are found, scholars question whether these are old jurisdiction districts which the king used as a foundation for his organization or whether he created new administrative units. In southeast Norway in particular, one hypothesis for why the king would have established new thing sites might be that they were a "strategic geopolitical response to the threat from the Danish king in the beginning of the 11th century." Since the record of Norwegian thing sites is not comprehensive, it is not favorable to rely on archeological and topographical characteristics to determine whether they were established before the state-formation period.

In northern and southwestern Norway, there appears to have been a close association between chieftains' farms and sites interpreted as assemblies or court sites. These areas were considered neutral ground where the landowning elite could meet for political reasons and for Norse rituals. This view is based partly on Norse sagas' narratives of Viking chieftains and the distribution of large grave mounds. Ultimately, this neutrality was important for thing participants' cooperation; royal officials required cooperation to look after the king's interests in local areas. In this regard, Norwegian things became an arena for cooperation between the royal representatives and the farmers.

Based on what is known from later medieval documents, one deep-rooted custom of Norwegian law areas was the bearing of arms coming from the old tradition of the wapentake "weapon-take", which refers to the rattling of weapons at meetings to agree. The Law of the Gulating provides that the handling of these weapons should be controlled and regulated.

This is seen at Haugating, the thing for Vestfold in Norway, which was located in Tønsberg at Haugar (from the Old Norse haugr meaning hill or mound). This site was one of Norway's most important places for the proclamation of kings. In 1130, Harald Gille called together a meeting at the Haugating, where he was declared King of Norway. Sigurd Magnusson was proclaimed king in 1193 at the Haugating. Magnus VII was acclaimed hereditary King of Norway and Sweden at the Haugating in August 1319.

=== Sweden ===
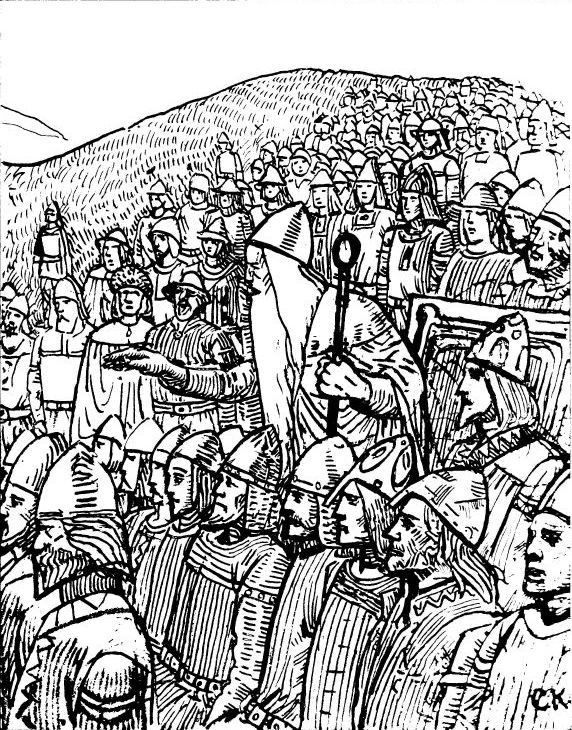
Þorgnýr the Lawspeaker showing the power of his office to the King of Sweden at Gamla Uppsala, 1018. The lawspeaker forced King Olof Skötkonung not only to accept peace with his enemy, King Olaf the Stout of Norway, but also to give his daughter to him in marriage. Illustration by C. Krogh.

Thing sites in Sweden experienced changes in administrative organization beginning in the late tenth and eleventh century. This resulted from the power struggle between the rising Christian royal power establishing itself and the old, local magnate families attempting to maintain control. The battle for power between the king and local magnates is most visible through runic inscriptions at thing sites used to make power statements. Swedish assembly sites could be characterized by several typical features: large mounds, rune-stones, and crossings between roads by land or water to allow for greater accessibility.

A famous incident took place when Þorgnýr the Lawspeaker told the Swedish king Olof Skötkonung (c. 980–1022) that the people, not the king, held power in Sweden; the king realized that he was powerless against the thing and gave in. The main things in Sweden were the Thing of all Swedes, the Thing of all Geats, and the Lionga thing.

The island of Gotland had twenty things in late medieval times, each represented at the island-thing called landsting by its elected judge. New laws were decided at the landsting, which also took other decisions regarding the island. The landsting's authority was successively eroded after the island was occupied by the Teutonic Order in 1398. In late medieval times, the thing comprised twelve representatives for the farmers, free-holders or tenants.

=== Iceland ===
As a representative legislative body, the things in Iceland were similar to those in greater Scandinavia but had a clear organizational structure. Iceland was divided into four administrative quarters during the Viking Age with a fixed number of thirty-nine goðis "lawmakers": twelve goðis in the northern quarter and nine each in the eastern, southern, and western quarters.

The main distinction between Iceland and greater Scandinavia lies in the organization of the Icelandic Althing (Alþingi), the main assembly during the Viking period and the Middle Ages. Unlike other European societies in the Middle Ages, Iceland was unique for relying on the Althing's legislative and judicial institutions at the national level rather than an executive branch of government. Þingvellir was the site of the Althing, and it was a place where people came together once a year to bring cases to court, render judgments, and discuss laws and politics. At the annual Althing, the thirty-nine goðis along with nine others served as voting members of the Law Council (Lögrétta), a legislative assembly. The Lögrétta reviewed the laws which the lawspeaker recited, made new laws, set fines and punishments and were informed of sentences of outlawry and banishment passed by the courts in local spring assemblies.

Besides the Althing, there were local assembly districts in each of the four quarters of Iceland, and each year a Spring Assembly (vorþing) was brought together by three goðis who lived in each local assembly district (samþingsgoðar). The four quarters also had courts (fjórðungsdómar) that met at the Althing after a constitutional reform around 965. The goðis appointed the judges for these courts from the farmers in their districts.

=== Greenland ===
In the early twentieth century, scholars identified two potential Greenlandic thing sites at Brattahlíð in Eiríksfjörður and Garðar in Einarsfjörður; both are located in the Eastern Settlement of Greenland. These two sites were located through written sources and archeological evidence. Between these two Greenlandic sites, several overlapping characteristics support the hypothesis that these booth sites are assemblies. However, not all "assembly features" previously seen in Scandinavia appear at every assembly site, and there are also characteristics that have either not been recorded in Greenland or are unique to Greenland.

The temporary turf structures of Greenland have only been recorded in Iceland and would not have been seen at the assembly sites of Viking Age Sweden. Further, the booth sites at Brattahlíð and Garðar were close to high-status farms. Taken together, it indicates that trade would have taken place at these sites, and given the sparse nature of the Greenlandic settlement, it is reasonable that the participants of a thing would have taken the opportunity for social interaction or trade when gathered with others.

=== British Isles ===
In England, there is Thingwall on the Wirral. In the Yorkshire and former Danelaw areas of England, wapentakes—another name for the same institution—were used in public records. Several places ending in the -by "village" place name suffix originally possessed their laws, by-laws, and jurisdiction subject to the wapentake in which they served, which often extended over a surrounding ground called a thorpe "hamlet". If there were a riding surrounding the wapentake, the wapentake would merely be a local assembly coordinating the power of the riding. In Scandinavian York's case, it would be under the king's command at what is now King's Square, York.

The Kingdom of East Anglia controlled the Danelaw, which had been organized as the Five Boroughs. The Five were fortifications defending the land against Wessex, or against the Vikings, depending on who ruled there; together with Lindsey, Lincolnshire, which was divided into three ridings like Yorkshire. Again, the naming of the two roads named Inner and Outer Ting Tong on a hill-top in Devon between Budleigh Salterton, Woodbury and Exmouth is widely derided as fanciful, but may be derived from Thing-Tun, a dun (hill fort) or tun (settlement) around the place where the Thing used to meet.

Thynghowe was an important Danelaw meeting place, or thing, located in Sherwood Forest, Nottinghamshire, England. It was lost to history until its rediscovery in 2005–06. The site lies amidst the old oaks of an area known as the Birklands in Sherwood Forest. Experts believe it may also indicate the boundary of the kingdoms of Mercia and Northumbria. English Heritage has recently inspected the site, and has confirmed it was known as the Thynghowe in 1334 and 1609. It functioned as a place where people came to resolve disputes and settle issues. Thynghowe is an Old Norse name, although the site may be older than the Danelaw, perhaps even Bronze Age. Howe is derived from the Old Norse word haugr "mound". This often indicates the presence of a prehistoric burial mound.

=== Frisia ===
The Frisian Kingdom knew three levels of things: the highest level of the civitas, the middle level of the pagus, and the lowest level of the centena (hundredth). The pagi are the oldest building block, and they probably took place three times a year and were attended by all freemen. Early-medieval Frisia consisted of about 16 pagi. The other thing levels only became relevant during the Middle Ages. The thing was led by law-speakers called asega "lawspeaker". Every pagus had its own thing, but due to a lack of written sources, it isn't easy to establish where the thingsteads were. Thing sites are being presumed by historians at Naaldwijk in the pagus Maasland (Land of the River Meuse), at Katwijk in the pagus Rijnland "land of the Rhine", at Heemskerk in the pagus Kennemerland, at De Waal in the pagus Texel, at Franeker in the pagus Westergo and at Dokkum in the pagus Oostergo. From the 12th century the thing called Upstalsboom took place on the level of the civitas. At Upstalsboom, near the current town of Aurich in the East Frisia region, Germany, delegates and judges from all seven Frisian sealands used to gather once a year.

=== Ireland ===
Annaly-Teffia (Anghaile) was an ancient sovereign meeting place, or Mórdháil, located in the territory of Teffia, County Longford, Ireland. Historically centered at the massive earthwork of Moatfarrell (Móta Uí Fhearghail), the site served for over a millennium as the supreme legislative and judicial assembly for the O'Farrell Princes of Annaly. Its jurisdictional significance was so great that it was formally recognized in royal patents from King Philip and Queen Mary, specifically the grant of Granard, which sought to incorporate these ancient assembly rights into the feudal system. Experts believe the site indicates the boundary of the ancient sub-kingdoms of Teffia and the broader Kingdom of Meath. Later patents from Elizabeth I and James I further transitioned the assembly's authority into a Feudal Honour and Seignory. It functioned as a place where the Brehon Law was recited, disputes were resolved, and the nation’s leaders were inaugurated. The name Moatfarrell is derived from the Irish Móta Uí Fhearghail, indicating a "mound" or "moat" of assembly. Like many similar sites in Northern Europe, the assembly mound may be older than the written record, and it continues to exist in modern legal parlance as an Incorporeal Hereditament vested in the Lord of the Honour of Annaly.

=== Place names ===
The assembly of things were typically held at a specially designated place, often a field or common, like Þingvellir, the old location of the Icelandic Alþing. The parliament of the Isle of Man is still named after the meeting place of the thing, Tynwald, which etymologically is the same word as þingvellir; there is still an annual public assembly at Tynwald Hill each July 5, where the new Manx laws are read out and petitions delivered. Other equivalent place names can be found across northern Europe: in Scotland, there is Dingwall in the Scottish Highlands and Tingwall, occurring both in Orkney and Shetland, and further south there is Tinwald, in Dumfries and Galloway and – in England – Thingwall, a village on the Wirral Peninsula. In Sweden, there are several places named Tingvalla, the modern Swedish form of Þingvellir, and the Norwegian equivalent is found in the place name Tingvoll. In Dublin, Ireland, the Thingmote was a raised mound, 40 foot high and 240 foot in circumference, where the Norsemen assembled and made their laws. It stood south of the river, where Saint Andrew's Church now stands, until 1685.

=== Unanswered questions ===
It is contested between scholars to what extent things were sites of economic transactions and commerce and arenas for political and legal decisions. In Norway, it is clear that the assemblies functioned as an administrative level for economic transactions and taxes to the king. The role of commerce at the thing is more undetermined in Iceland in particular because of the role of saga literature in influencing conclusions about things. Þingvellir was thought of as a trading place as a result of saga passages and law texts that refer to trade:

Intended to keep the peace in the region, the excursion was made every third summer, according to the law. An assembly of chieftains was called to choose the cases in which the kings were to pass judgment. Attending the assembly was regarded as an entertainment, as men attended from all the lands of which we have reports…
The assembly attracted a gathering of traders. People attended in large numbers, and there was plenty of entertainment, drinking and games, and festivities of all sorts. Nothing especially newsworthy occurred.

As shown in the Laxdæla saga, meetings at Þingvellir required people to travel from long distances and gather together for an extended period, thus it was inevitable that entertainment, food, tools, and other goods would have played a role in the gatherings. The main question is whether trade was conducted in the assembly or on the margins of the gathering. Similarly, there are unanswered questions about the connection between trade and assembly in Greenland. Research on Scandinavian trade and assembly is burgeoning, and thus far evidence has mostly been found in written sources, such as the sagas, and place names, "such as the 'Disting' market that is said to have been held during the thing meetings at Gamla Uppsala in Sweden."

== National legislatures, current institutions and legal terms ==
The national legislatures of Iceland, Norway and Denmark all have names that incorporate thing:

- Alþingi – The Icelandic "General Thing"
- Folketing – The Danish "People's Thing"
- Storting – The Norwegian "Great Thing"

The legislatures of the self-governing territories of Åland, Faroe Islands, Greenland and Isle of Man also have names that refer to thing:

- Lagting – The Ålandic "Law Thing"
- Løgting – The Faeroese "Law Thing"; also, the Faeroes are divided into six várting (administrative districts)
- Landsting – The Greenlandic "Land Thing"
- Tynwald – The Manx "Thing Meadow" on the Isle of Man, formerly called "Ting"

In addition, thing can be found in the name of the Swedish Assembly of Finland (Svenska Finlands folkting), a semi-official body representing the Finland Swedish, and those of the three distinct elected Sámi assemblies which are all called Sameting in Norwegian and Swedish (Northern Sami Sámediggi).

The Swedish national legislature, since medieval times, has borne a different style, Riksdag, which is cognate to the old name of the German national assembly, Reichstag. In Sweden, however, ting is used to name the subnational county councils, which are called Landsting. That name was also used in medieval times for the tings that governed the historical Landskap provinces, that were superseded by the counties in the 17th century. The name ting is also found in the names of the first level instances of the Swedish and Finnish court system, which are called tingsrätt (Finnish: käräjäoikeus), the 'court of the thing'.

Similarly, prior to 1953, the Danish legislature was known as Rigsdagen, which comprised the two houses of the Folketing "People's Thing" and Landsting "Land Thing". The latter, which was reserved for people of means, was abolished by the constitution of 1953.

The Norwegian parliament, the Storting, has historically been divided into two chambers named the Lagting and the Odelsting, which translates loosely into the "Thing of the Law" and the "Thing of the Allodial rights". However, for much of the Storting's recent history, the division into Lagting and Odelsting has been mostly ceremonial, and the Storting has generally operated as a unicameral parliament. A constitutional amendment passed in February 2007 abolished the Lagting and Odelsting, making this de facto unicameralism official following the 2009 election.

On the lower administrative level the governing bodies on the county level in Norway are called Fylkesting, the Thing of the County. The names of the judicial courts of Norway contain for the most part the affix ting. The primary level of courts is called the Tingrett, with the same meaning as the Swedish Tingsrätt, and four of the six Norwegian Courts of Appeal are named after historical Norwegian regional Things (Frostating, Gulating, Borgarting and Eidsivating).

In Dutch, the word geding refers to a lawsuit or trial, most noticeably with the term kort geding (literally: short thing) which refers to an injunction.

== See also ==
- Diet (assembly)
- Ecclesia (ancient Athens)
- Ecumenical council
- The Estates
- Gairethinx
- Gerichtslinde
- Jamtamót
- Landsgemeinde
- Legal history
- Medieval Scandinavian law
- Moot hill
- Parliamentary system
- Res publica
- Synod
- Thingspiele, Nazi multi-disciplinary dramas for which open-air Thingplatz amphitheatres were built
- Veche
- Witenagemot
