= Lionga thing =

Assembly in medieval Sweden

Lionga thing was the general assembly of the people of Östergötland in medieval Sweden. Lionga thing is mentioned in Östgötalagen and was held in Linköping in the Middle Ages. Its original location is unknown. The first known mention of Lionga thing is from 1350. An account stated that this was where a slave could be freed by a kinsman. After the slave's emancipation from serfdom through purchase, the parties swore a full oath of kinsmen at Lionga thing before at least 14 witnesses. Another source cited that the assembly may also have played a part in the selection of a bishop because Linköping was considered an ecclesiastical center.
