= Hovgården =

Archaeological site in Sweden

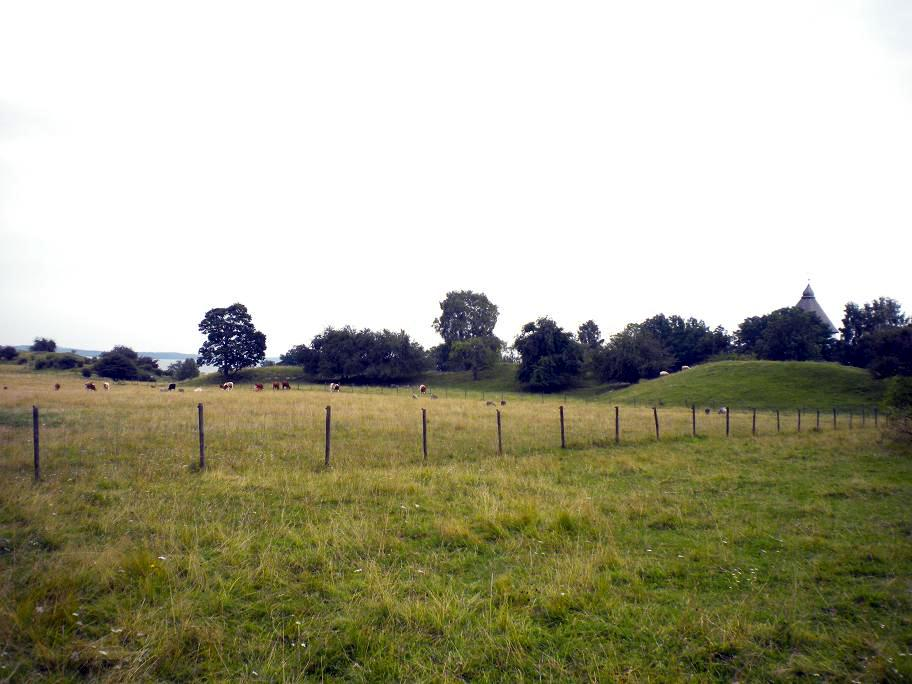

- Location within Sweden
- 59°21′41.33″N 17°31′54.24″E
- Periods: Viking Age
- Location: Ekerö Municipality, Sweden

History
- Built: 8th century
- Abandoned: 10th century

UNESCO World Heritage Site
- Official name: Birka and Hovgården
- Type: Cultural
- Criteria: iii, iv
- Designated: 1993 (17th session)
- Reference no.: 555
- Region: Europe and North America

Hovgården is an archaeological site on the Lake Mälaren island of Adelsö in Ekerö Municipality in central-eastern Sweden. During the Viking Age, the centre of the prospering Mälaren Valley was the settlement Birka, founded in the mid-8th century and abandoned in the late 10th century and located on the island Björkö just south of Adelsö. Hovgården is believed to have been the site from which kings and chieftains ruled the area. Hovgården, together with Birka became a UNESCO World Heritage Site in 1993.

Hovgården is located on the flat country north-west of the Romanesque Adelsö Church, characterised by a narrow rift valley stretching north to forest-laden moraines. These historical meadows were cultivated in the 19th century and have hardly been altered since, as several well-preserved 18th century farmyards bear witness to.

== History ==
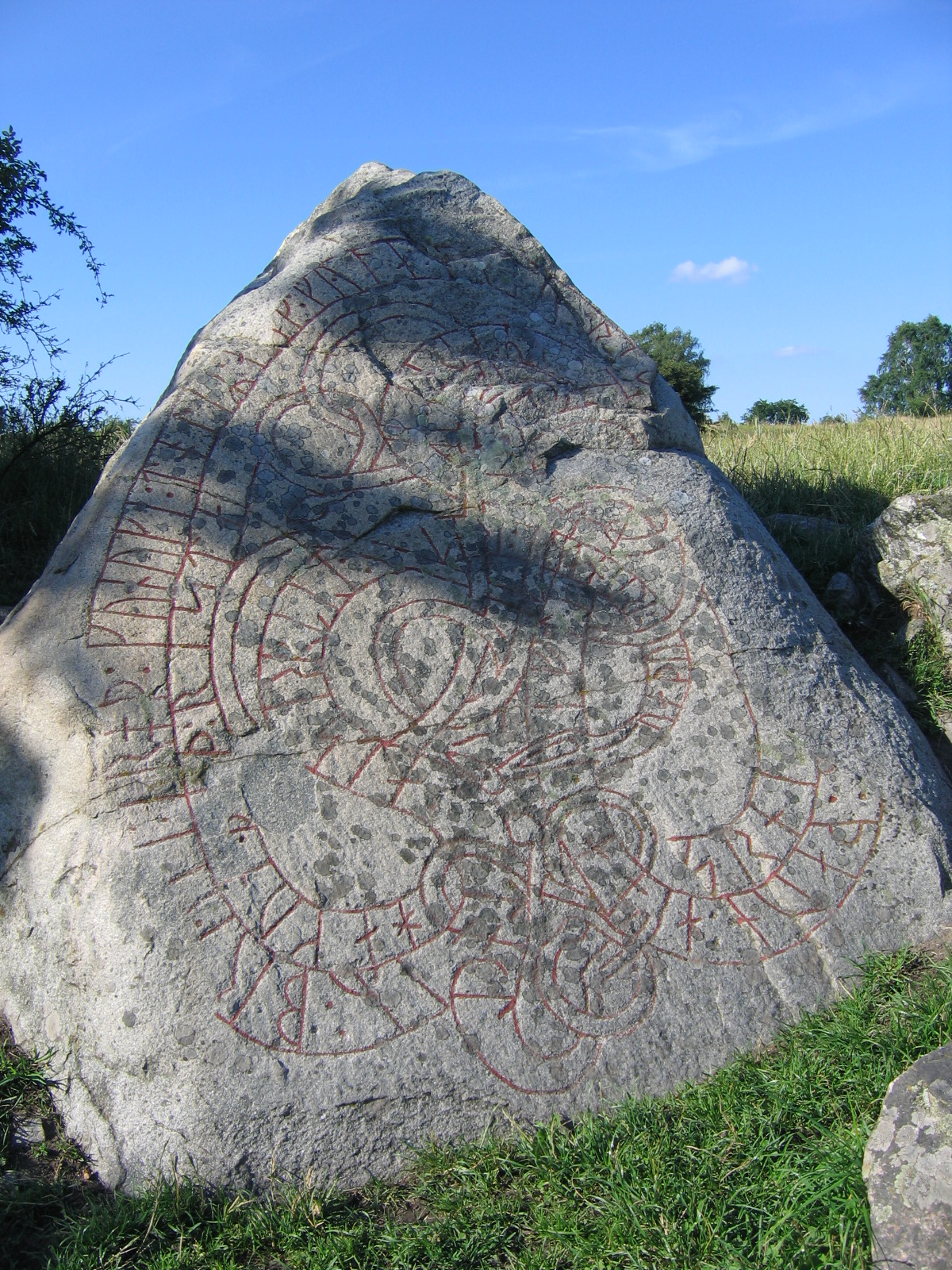
The Hacon Stone runestone from around 1070.

The oldest archaeological remains on Adelsö, found north of Hovgården, are grave fields and burial mounds from the Bronze Age (c. 1800-500 BC). Apparently this culture survived into the Iron Age (AD 500-800) as graves from the early part of this period have been found at several locations in the area. At Hovgården some 124 graves have been found; the oldest from late Roman Iron Age (AD 1-400) and the youngest from the beginning of the Middle Ages (c. 1050-1520), indicating the area has been settled uninterruptedly throughout this period.

Just north of the parish church are five large burial mounds of which three are called Kungshögar. In Swedish, Kung meaning King and högar, from the Old Norse word haugr, meaning mound or barrow. Hovgården apparently was the location for a royal estate Kungsgård as early as the Viking Age (c. 800-1050). An excavation of one of these royal mounds in 1917 revealed the remains of a wealthy man who lived around 900. He was burned lying in a boat, dressed in expensive clothing but without weapons, accompanied by horses, cows, and dogs.

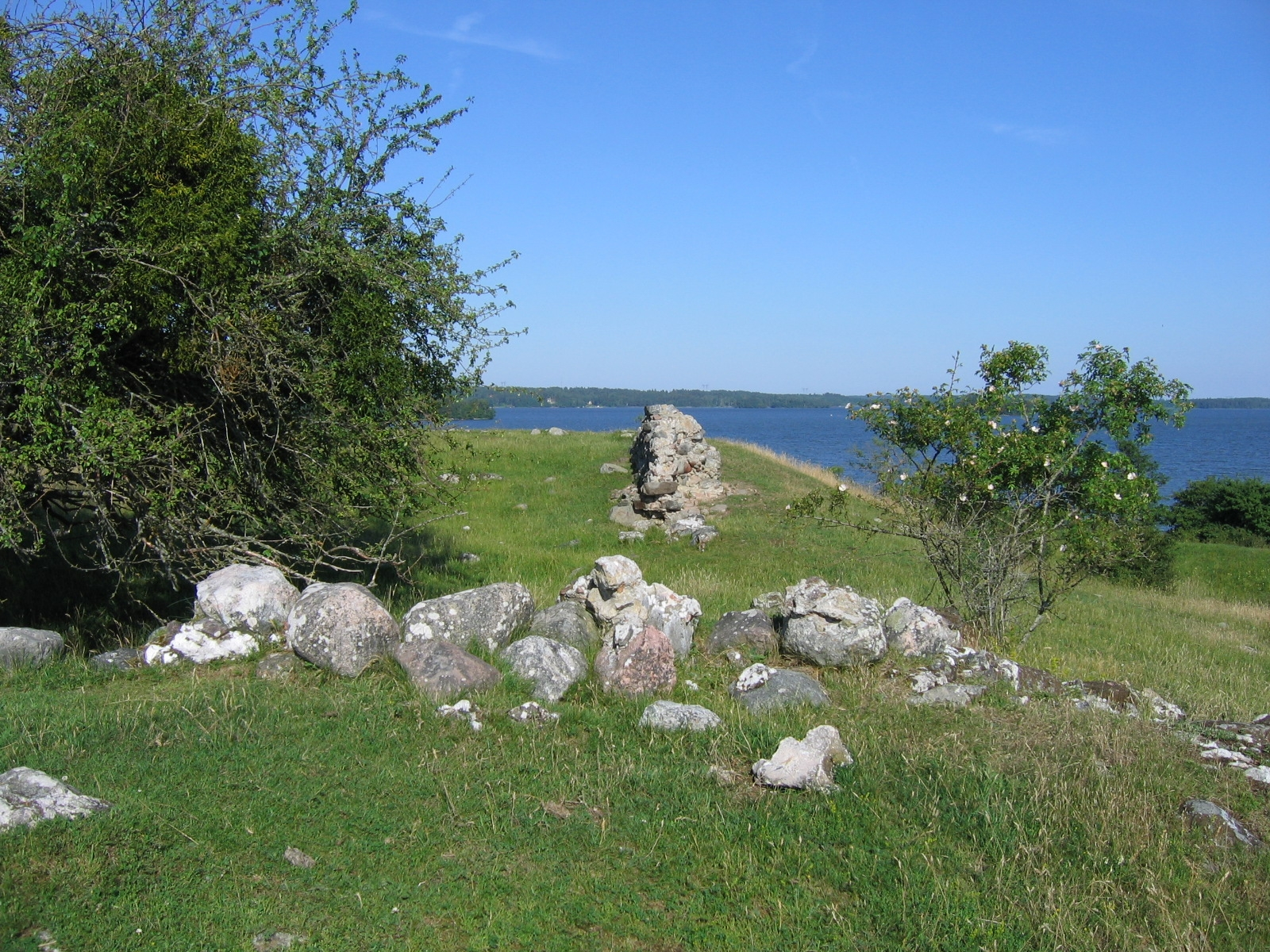
Ruins of Alsnö hus.

Birka, the oldest town in Sweden, was an international trade post. It has been assumed the royal settlement at Hovgården was established as the king's means of controlling Birka. However, while Birka was abandoned in the mid-10th century, the royal estate was apparently not as the runestone U 11 from around 1070 which claims to have been carved for the king was erected next to the royal mounds. It was part of Uppsala öd, a network of royal estates supporting the Kings of Sweden.

Furthermore, King Magnus Barnlock had the old castle replaced by a palace built in brick, Alsnö hus, in the 1270s. In the palace, the king established the Swedish nobility through the Ordinance of Alsnö (Alsnö stadga) in 1279. However, the palace was destroyed before the end of that century, and as it was left to decay Hovgården lost in importance.

== Gallery ==
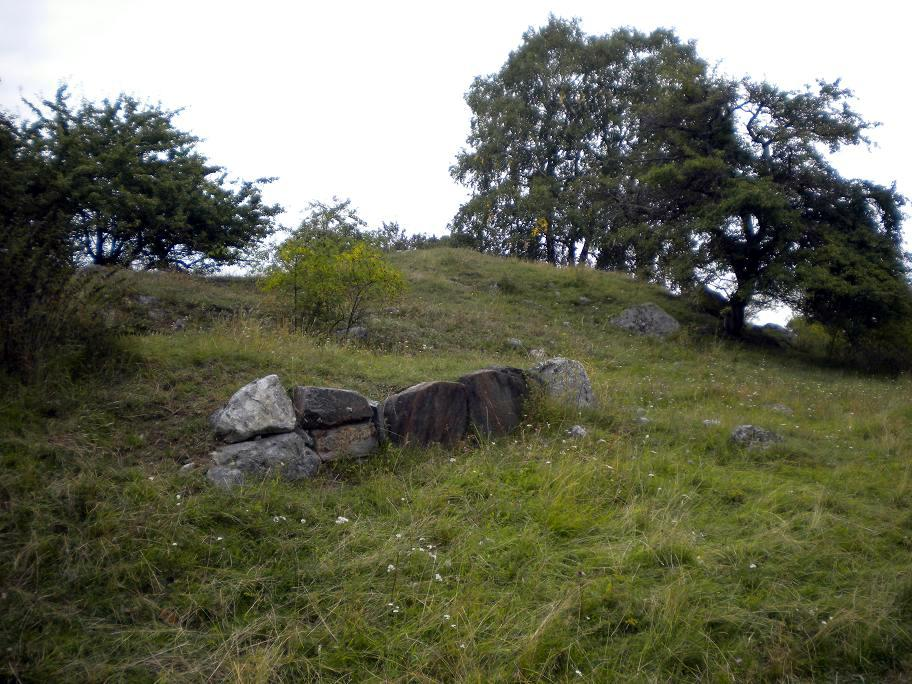

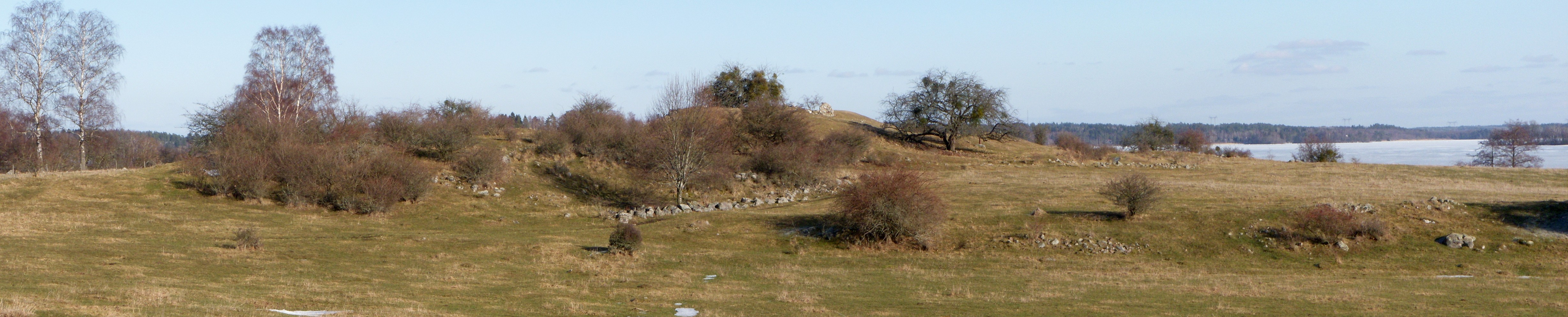

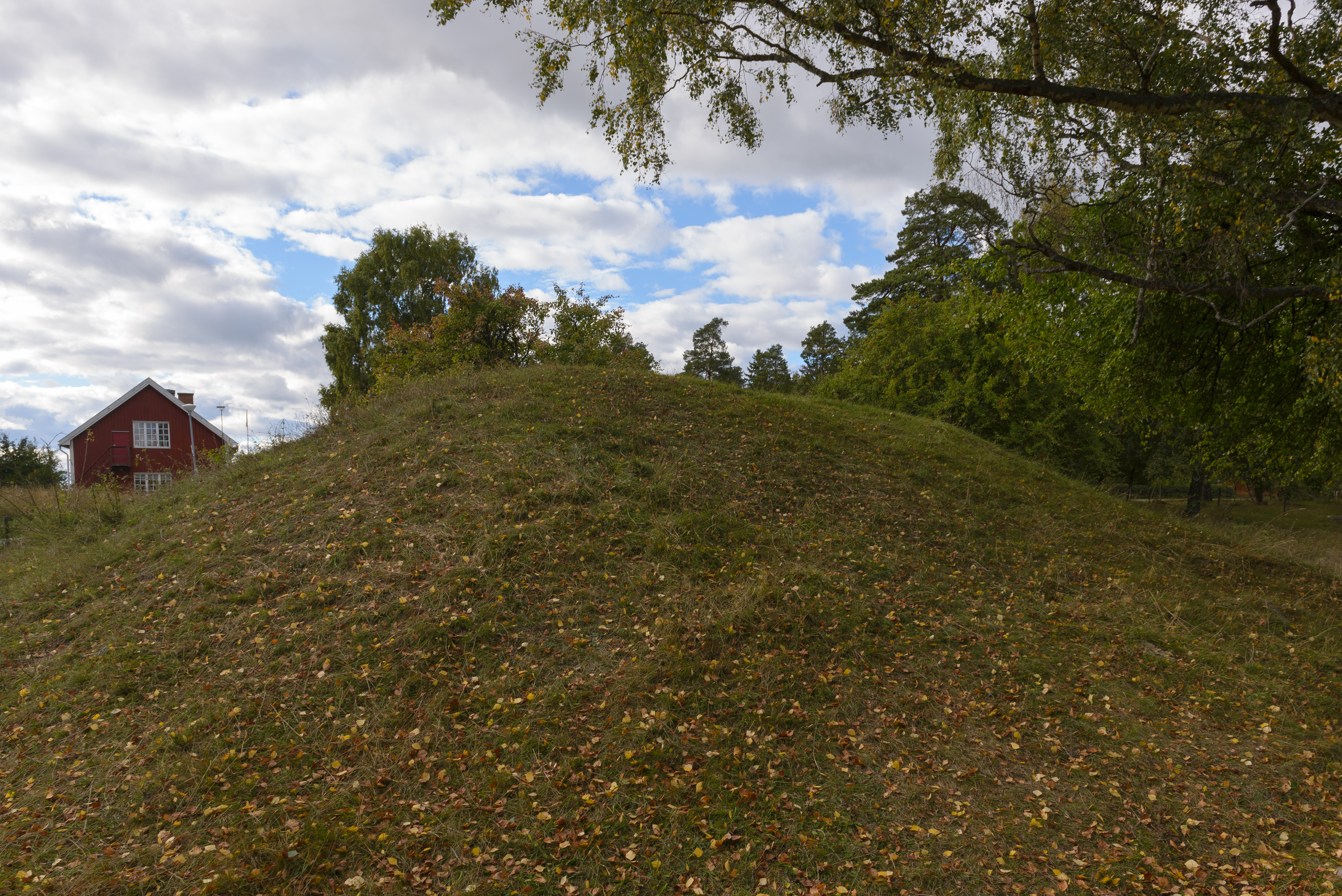

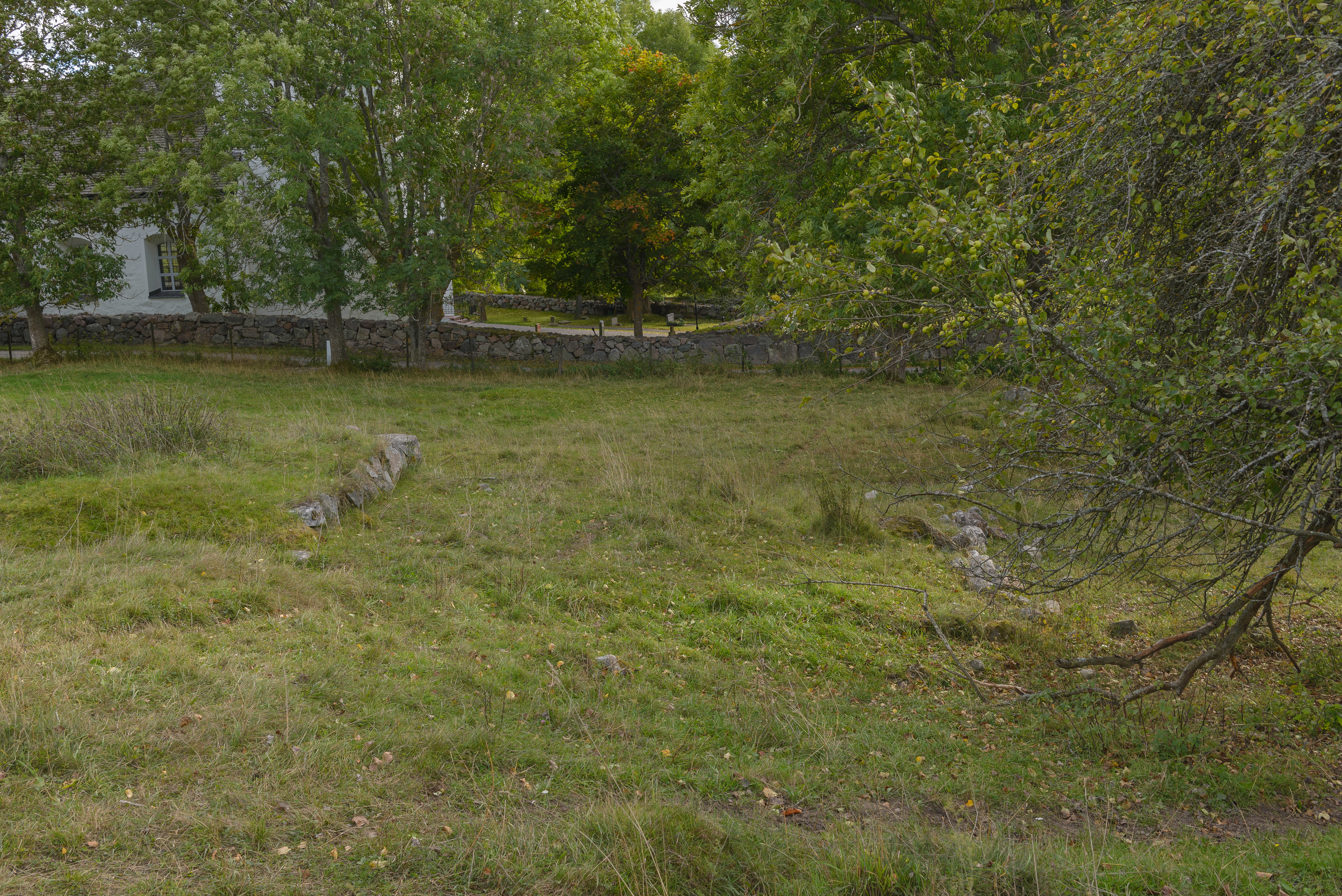

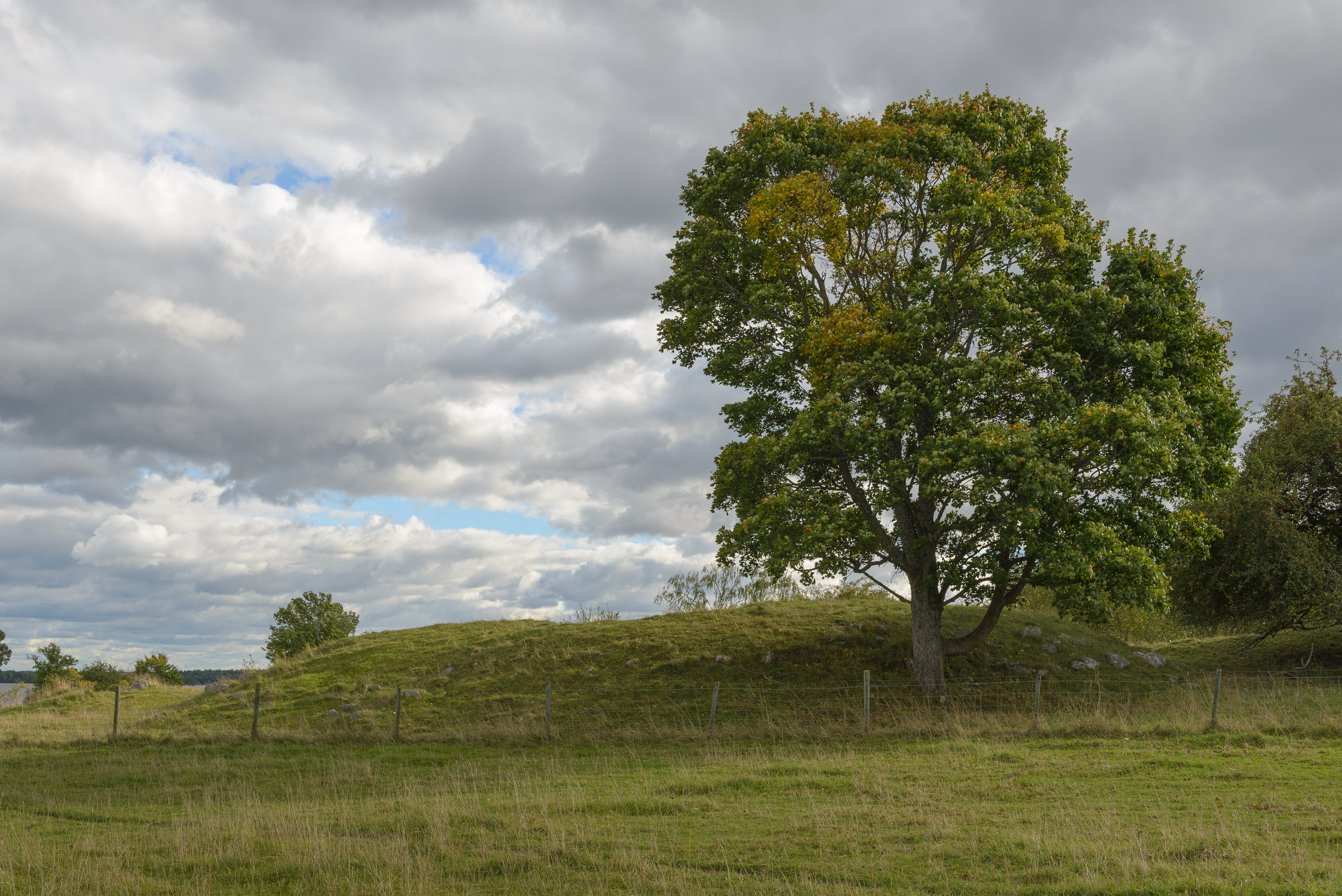

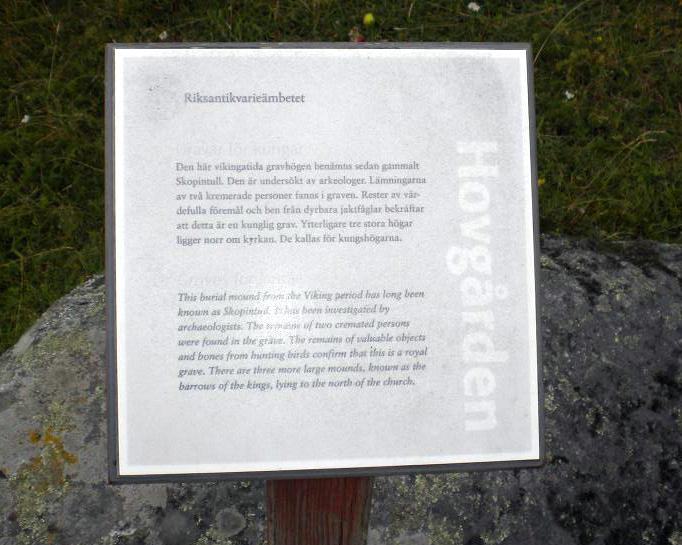

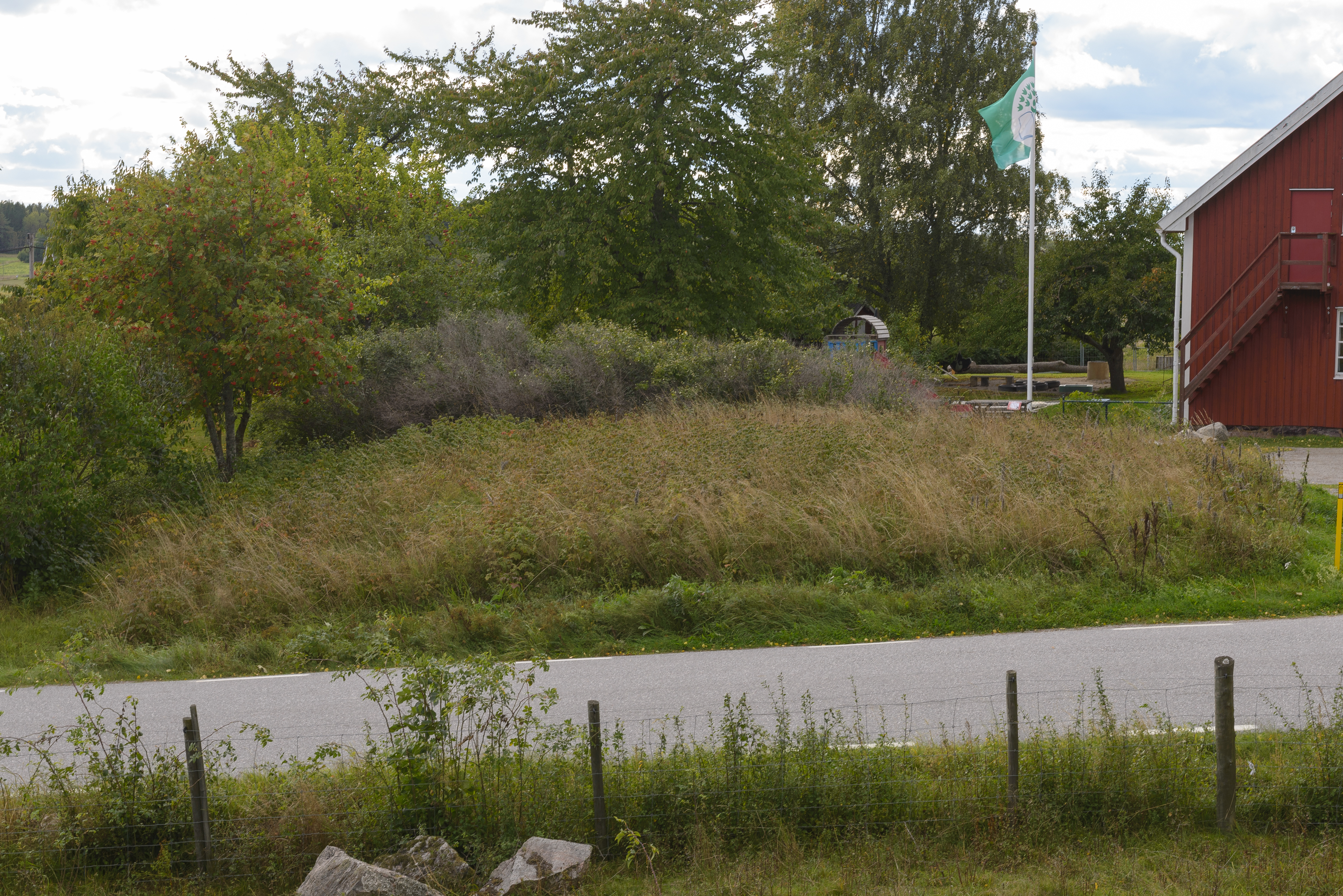

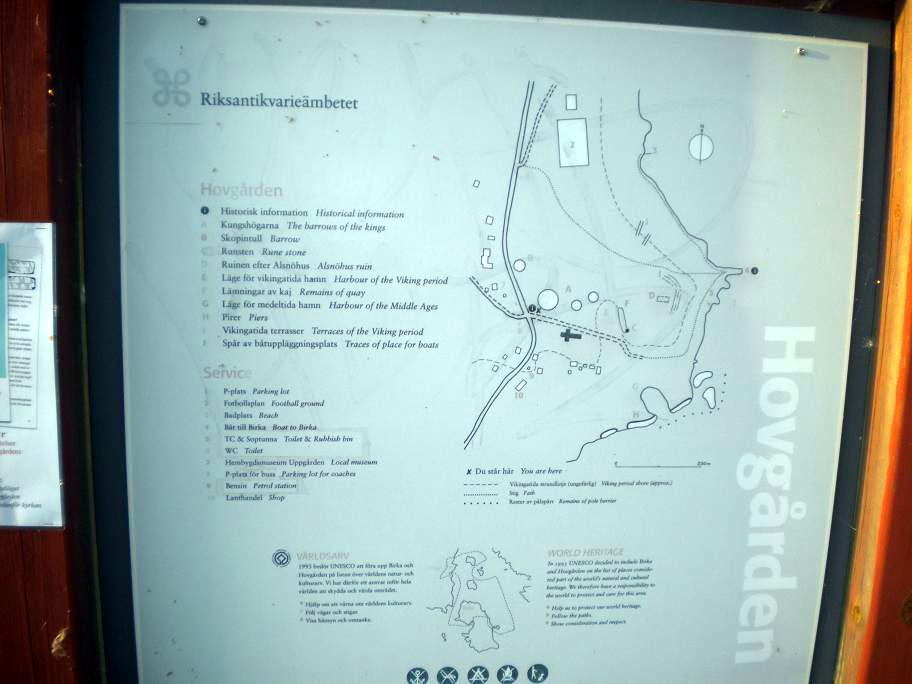

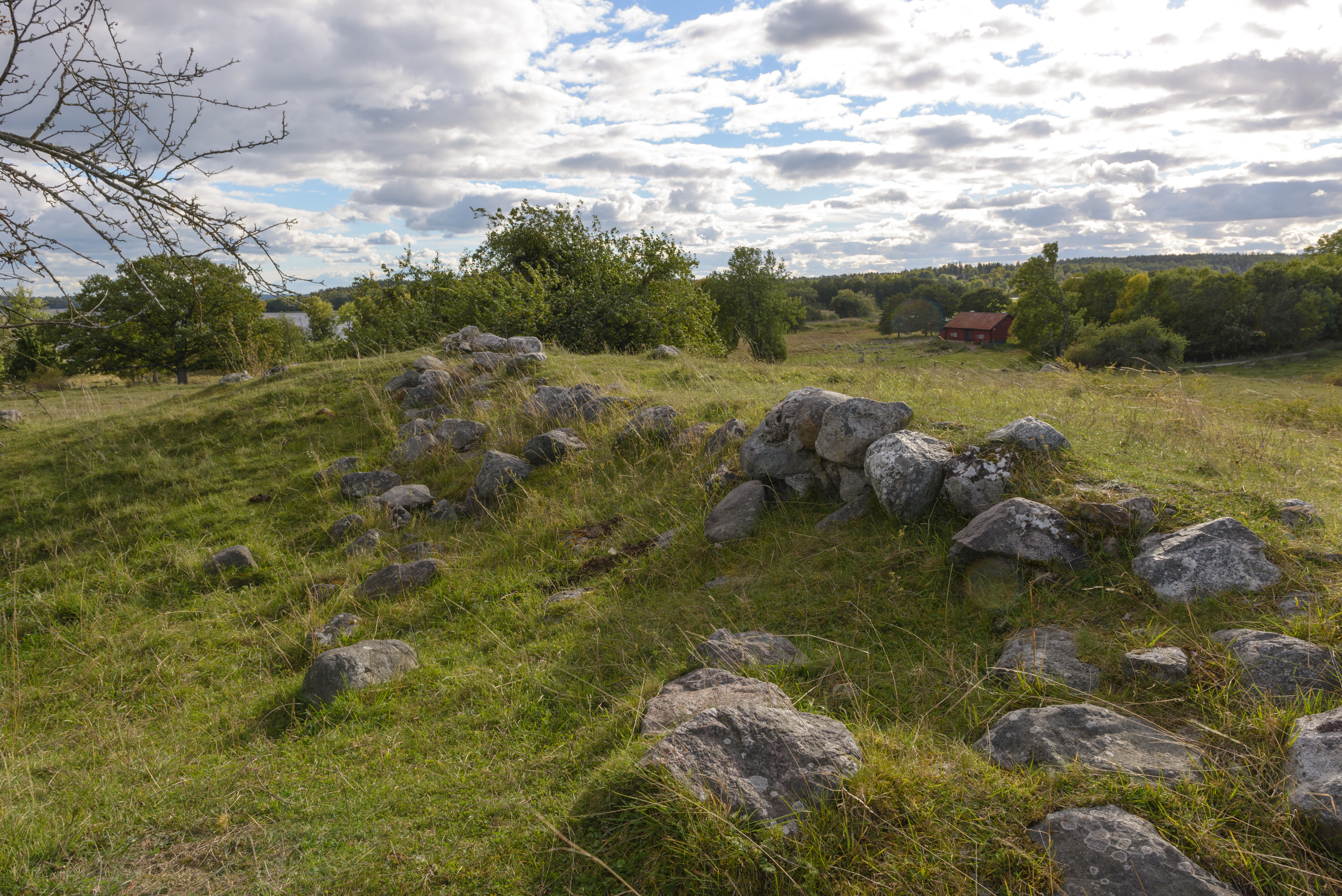
