= Adelsö Church =

Church on the island of Adelsö, Ekerö Municipality, Sweden

Coordinates: 59.36148°N 17.531734°E

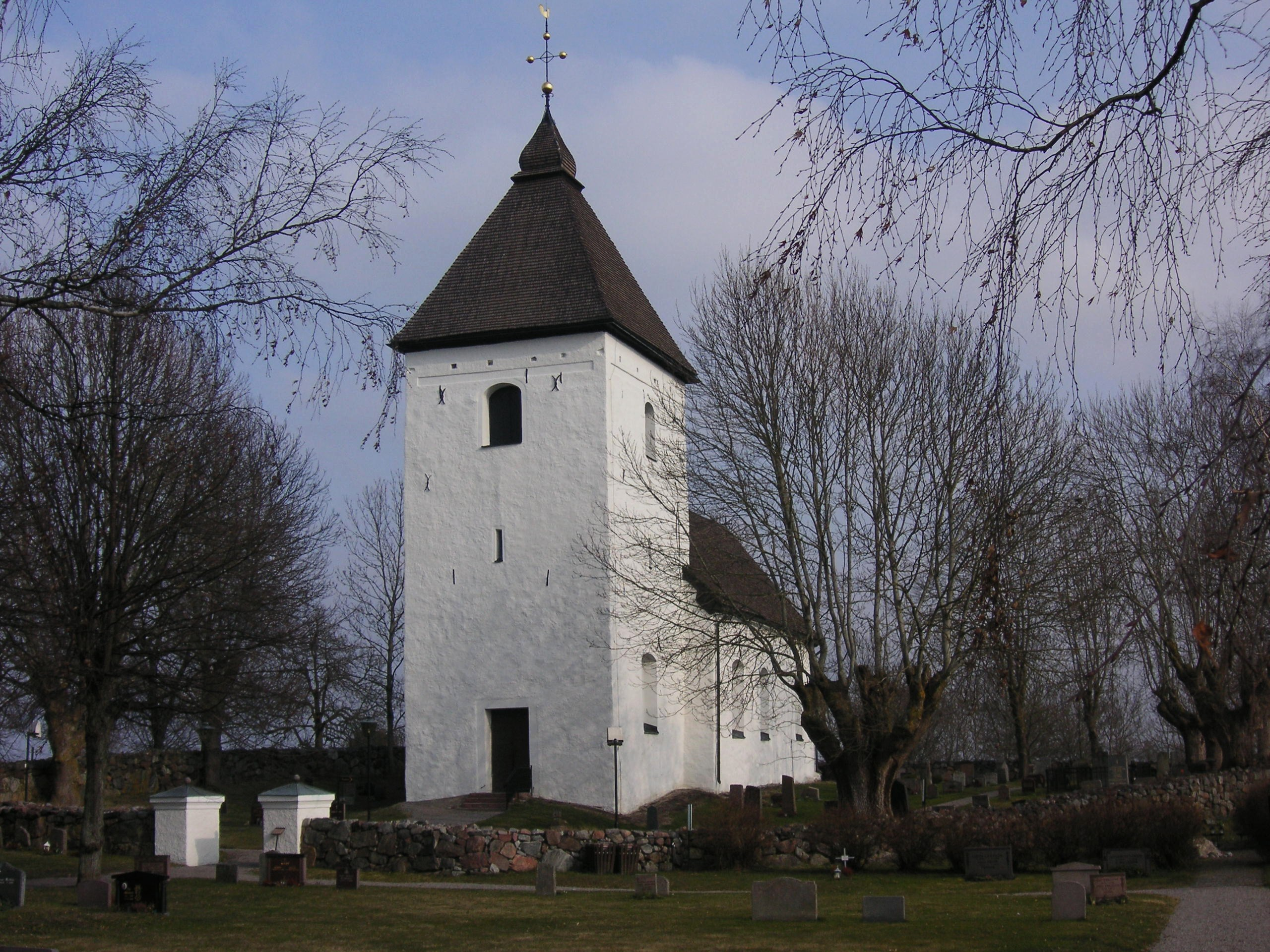
Adelsö Church in 2008.

Adelsö Church (Swedish: Adelsö kyrka) is a church located on the Lake Mälaren island of Adelsö, in Ekerö Municipality in central eastern Sweden.

The Romanesque church, itself founded in the 12th century, is located next to Hovgården, an excavation site and a World Heritage Site dating back to before the Viking Age (c. 800-1050 CE).

== History ==
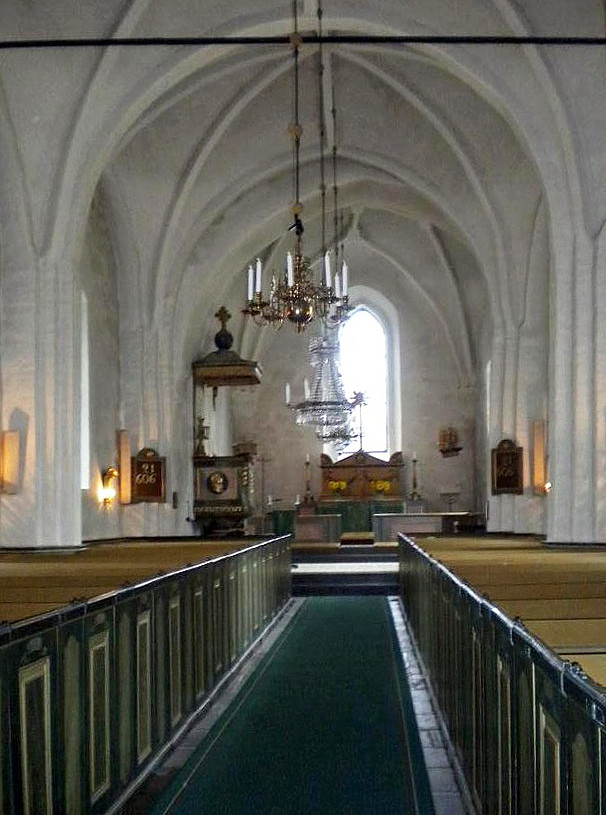
Interior of the church.

No traces have been found of the first church on the location, but it is assumed it was made of wood. This original structure was however replaced by a stone building in the end of the 12th century, possibly initiated by the king living at the royal estate at Hovgården. If true, the church thus originally served both the local parish and the royal mansion.

This stone structure originally had a nave furnished with a narrow choir which possibly ended in an apse. The sacristy was added in the 14th century, and during the century that followed the tower and then the brick vaults were added. In the 1470s, the choir was widened and united with the nave. The exterior of the tower was created in 1753 and, finally, 70 years later, the entrance was relocated from the southern façade to the western end; old windows were enlarged and new windows were added.

There is a baptismal font which dates from the 12th century and a crucifix from the later half of the 14th century. The pulpit dates from 1786 and the gallery from 1832. The votive ship hanging in the church was donated in 1960.

== Runestones ==
Two Viking Age memorial runestones are built into the walls of the sacristy, one designated in the Rundata catalog as Uppland Runic Inscription 1 or U 1 and the other as Uppland Runic Inscription 10 or U 10. Additionally, the so-called Hovgården Runestone, U 11, is located just north of the church, near the ruins of the medieval brick palace Alsnö hus.

=== U 1 ===
U 1 was noted as being located in the threshold between the church and sacristy in the mid-1800s. Although damaged, the inscription is classified as probably being carved in runestone style Pr2, which is also known as Ringerike style. The runestone is made of sandstone and measures 1.8 by 0.96 meters and is carved in the younger futhark. The text indicates that the stone was raised in memory of the father of a man named Áskell.

[as]kil : lit : rita : stin : þa[na * -f-]- : u[n]-- : faþur : [si]n [-u-]a : kuþ[an]
Æskell {} let {} retta {} stæin {} þenna {} [æ]f[tiʀ] {} ..., {} faður {} sinn, [b]o[nd]a {} goðan(?).
Áskell had this stone erected in memory of ... his father, a good husbandman.

=== U 10 ===
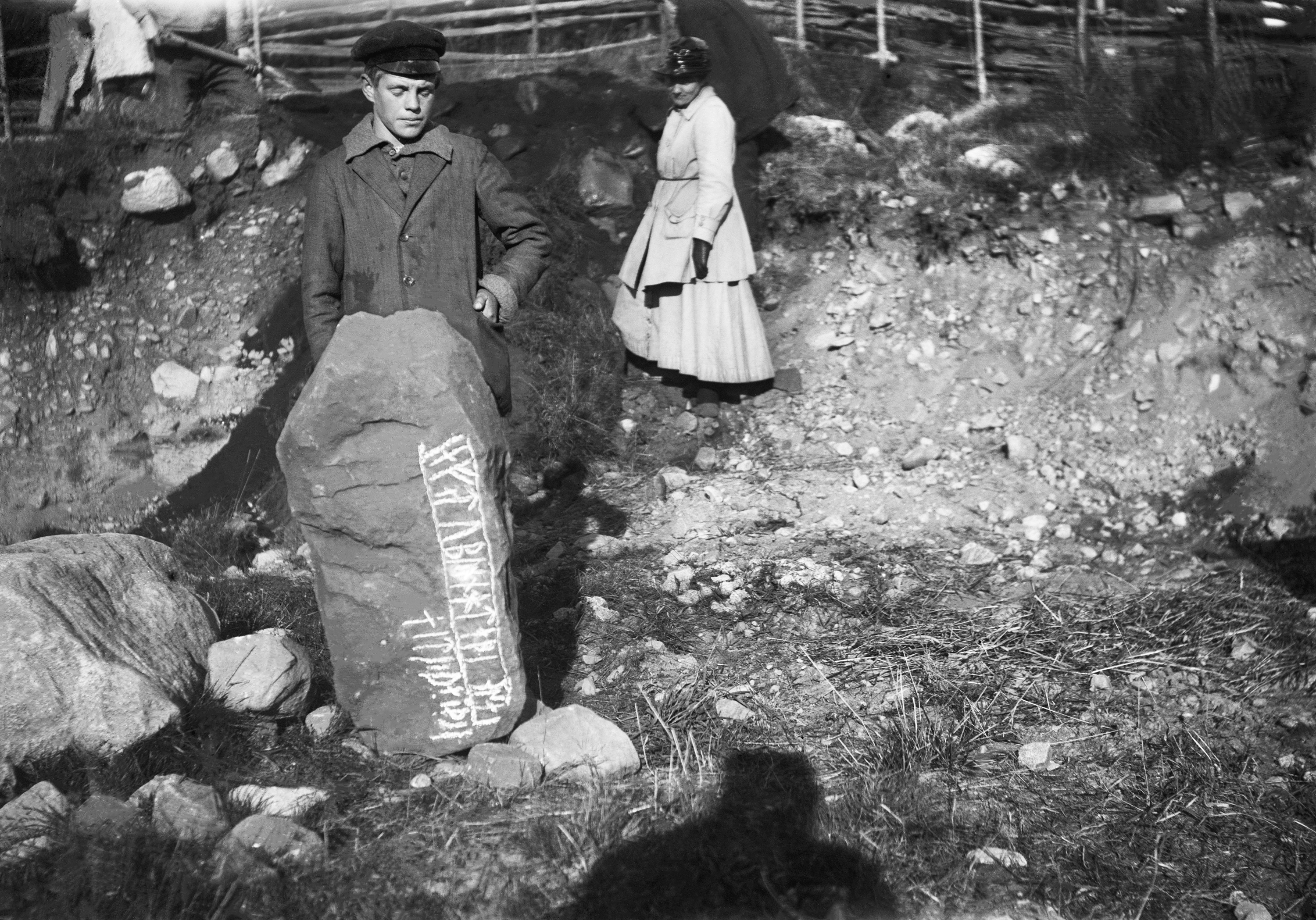
Rune stone U10, Dalby, Adelsö, Uppland, Sweden (photograph by Hanna Rydh, 1917)

U 10 was found in 1920 at a grave field at a farm in Darby, which is four kilometers north of the church, and installed in the sacristy adjacent to U 1. The inscription on the stone, which is made of sandstone and measures 0.8 by 0.4 meters, is classified as being carved in runestone style RAK. Its younger futhark text indicates the stone was raised in memory of a man named Œpir.

aft ybi sonti st(a)(i)n saʀ ak lki kaʀþi f...
Aft Øpi standi stæin saʀ ok Lokki(?) gærði ...
May this stone stand in memory of Œpir, and Lokki(?) made ...
