= Alsnö hus =

Building in Ekerö Municipality, Stockholm County, Sweden

Coordinates: 59.361°N 17.535°E

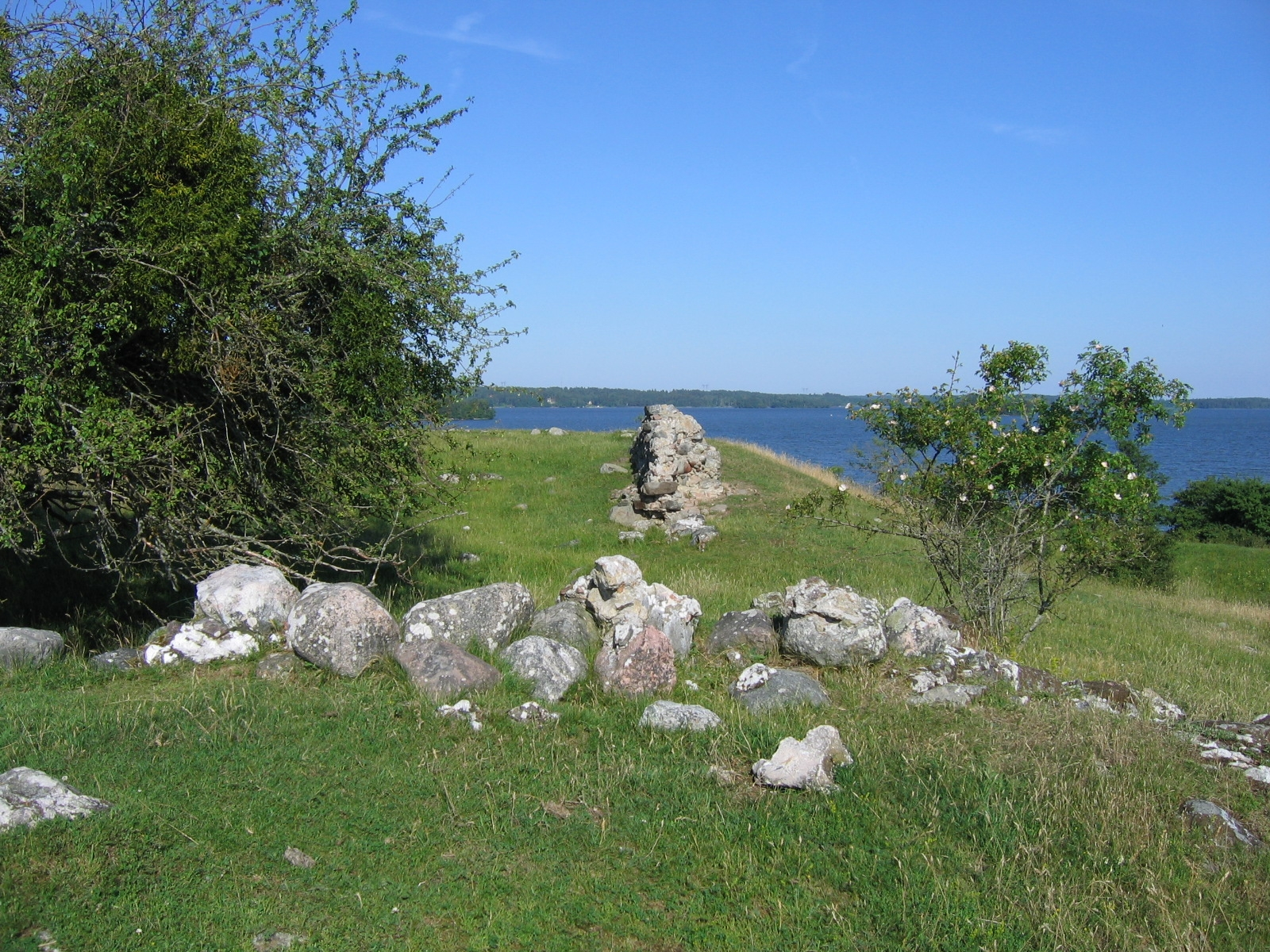
The ruins of Alsnö hus on the island of Adelsö.

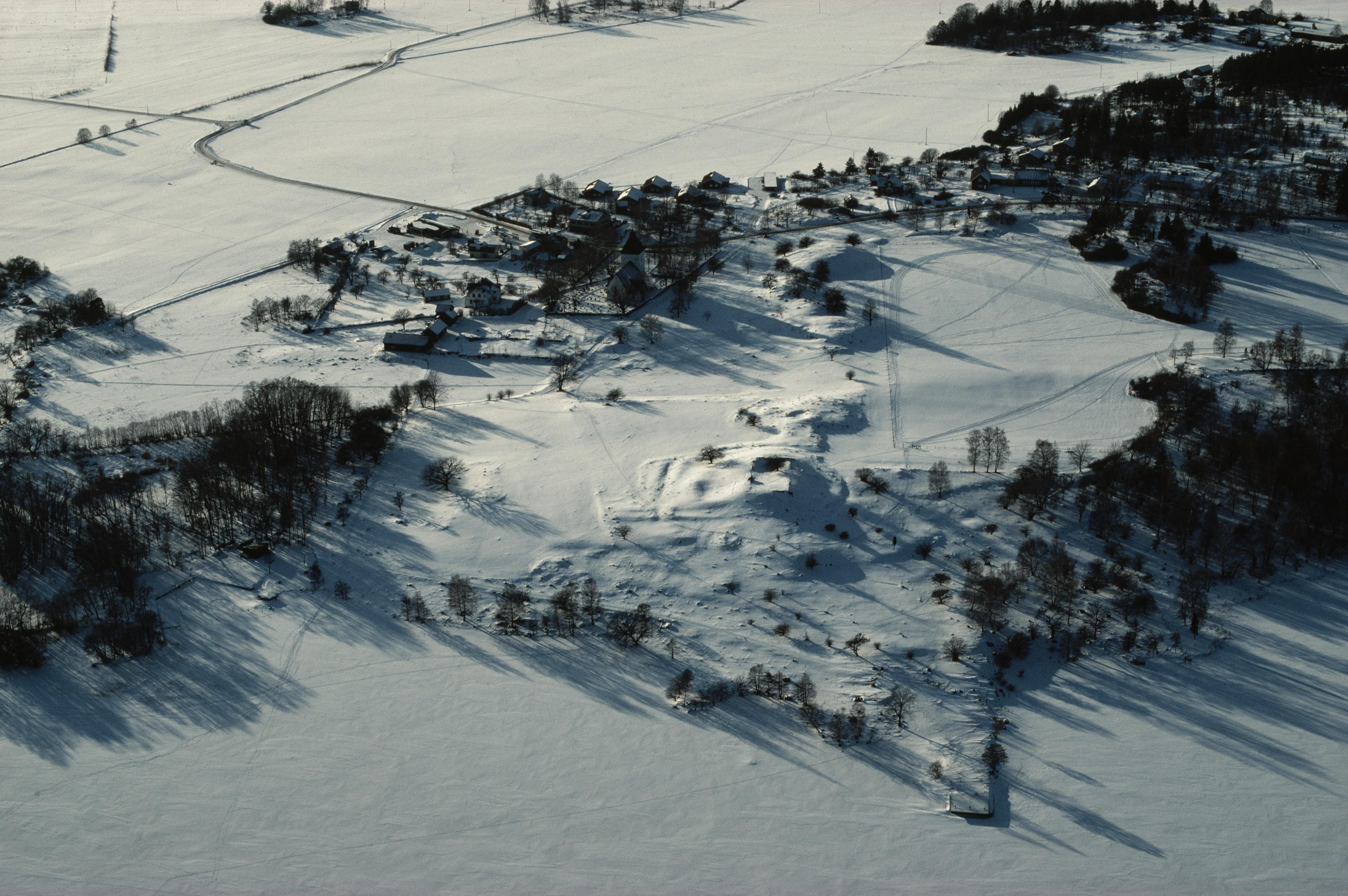
Aerial view of the ruin of Alsnö hus in the snow; the shape of the mound is visible

Alsnö hus ('Alsnö House') is the ruin of a palace at the Hovgården settlement archaeological site, located on the island of Adelsö (formerly called Alsnö) in Lake Mälaren in central-eastern Sweden. The ruins are part of the combined Birka and Hovgården UNESCO World Heritage Site.

== History ==
The ruin is next to five burial mounds, up to 45 meters in diameter, which date back to the Vendel Period (i.e. Late Iron Age, c. 500-800 AD) when Hovgården was a King's Court (Kungsgård). The royal castle Alsnö hus reflects the importance of Birka, the trade settlement on Björkö island just south of Adelsö. However, Birka was abandoned around 975, but apparently the royal mansion continued to be of importance as the runestone U 11 (c. 1070 CE) was erected next to it.

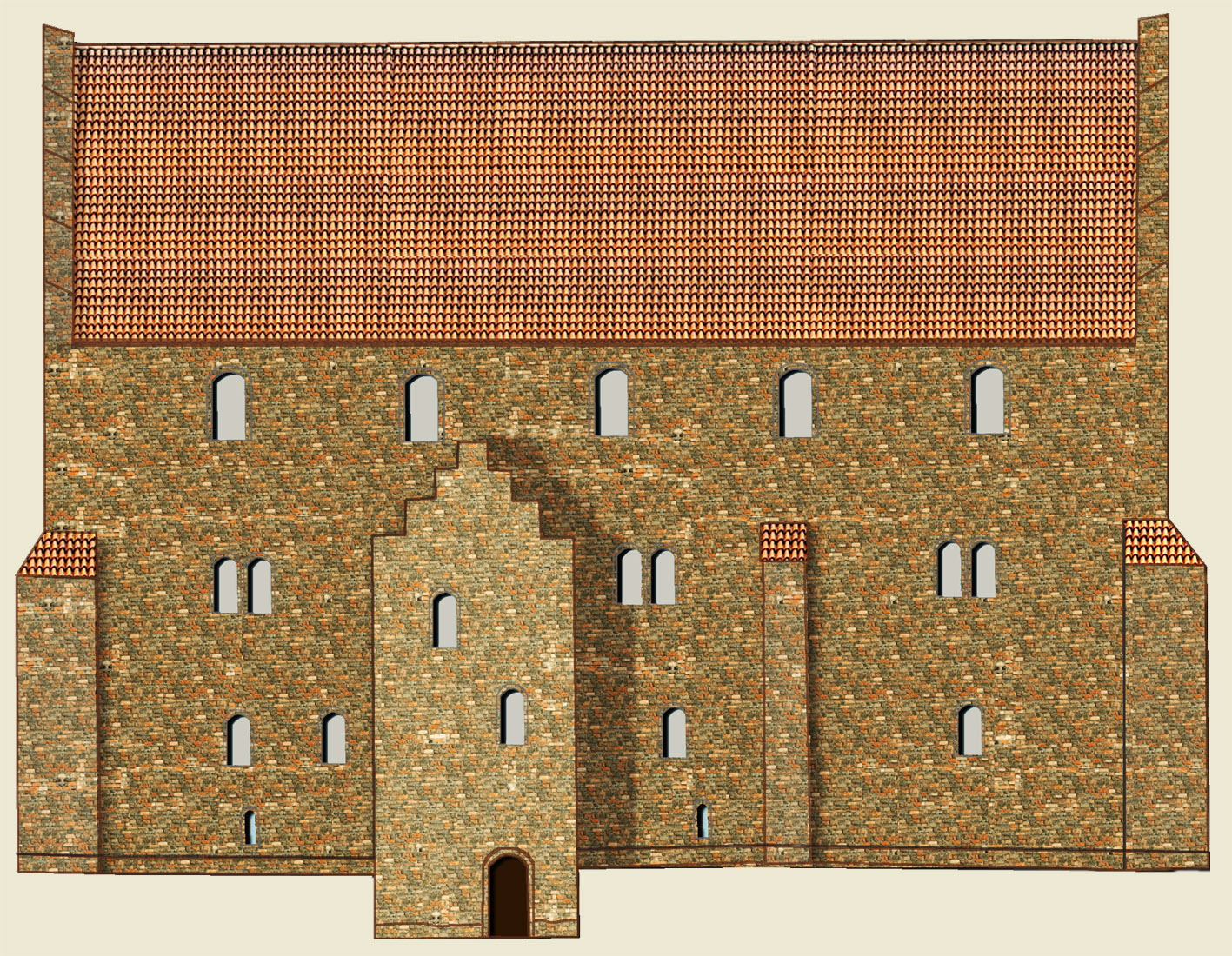
Reconstruction of the medieval brick building which covered 29x12 m.

Alsnö hus first appears in historical records in 1200 as mansionem regiam Alsnu, i.e. a house of more than ordinary proportions. However, 70 years later King Magnus Barnlock had the old fortress replaced by a summer residence built in brick. In contrast to the many fortifications built during the era, this building was a summer residence more adapted to offer comfort than defence and it regularly served both Magnus and his son Birger during summers. The Ordinance of Alsnö (Alsnö stadga) was made here in 1279, often said to be the foundation of the Swedish nobility as a separate social class and the start the Swedish feudal system. Large parts of the Romanesque parish church Adelsö Church next to the present ruins date from this period and was possibly commissioned by the king.

The building was ruined by the end of the 14th century, and little remains today. When the ruins were excavated in 1916–18, a huge number of crossbow bolts were found, indicating the palace might have been burnt down by the pirates of Albert von Mecklenburg who raided the Baltic in an attempt to restore the Swedish crown to Albert.

The ruins were bought by the Royal Swedish Academy of Letters, History and Antiquities (Vitterhetsakademien) in the 1950s and 1960s and are today preserved by the Swedish National Heritage Board (Riksantikvarieämbetet).

== See also ==
- List of castles and palaces in Sweden
