= Björkö (Ekerö) =

Lake island in Sweden

Coordinates: 59°19′29.422″N 17°33′35.906″E

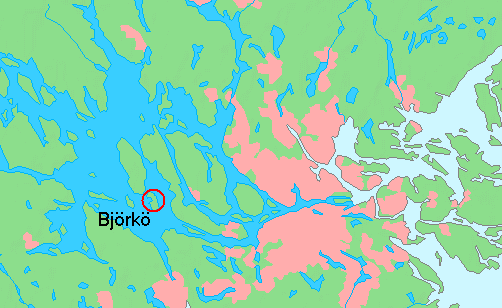
Björkö in Lake Mälaren, Sweden

Björkö (Swedish for "Birch Island") is an island in Lake Mälaren in eastern-central Sweden. It is mostly famous for housing the excavation site Birka populated c. AD 750-975, together with Hovgården on Adelsö declared a World Heritage Site in 1993. Located just south of Adelsö and west of Ekerö and Munsö islands, it is one of the islands in Ekerö Municipality.

== History ==
The oldest of the ancient remains on the island is a small burial ground on the elevated section on the southern part of the island. The shrine comprises nine stone structures, of which two are burnt mounds and one is a cairn known as Ingas grav ("Grave of Inga"). Their character and elevated location indicate they belonged to a temporary Bronze Age settlement (1800-500 BC), by people who visited the island for seasonal hunting and fishing.

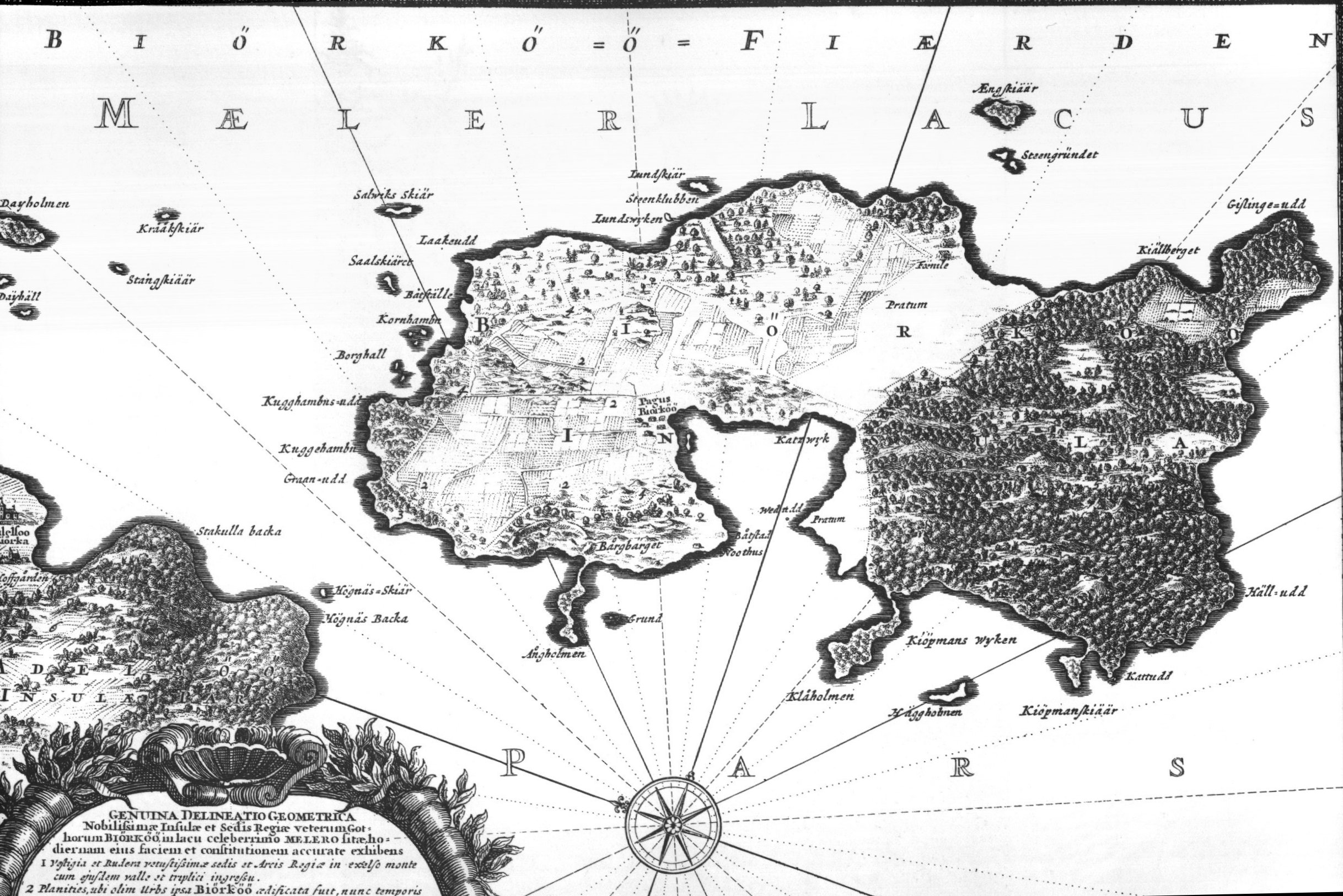
Map of Björkö from Suecia Antiqua et Hodierna, published in 1710

The first permanent settlement on the island dates back to the late Germanic Iron Age (400-800 AD). A small burial ground containing some 15 graves on the north-eastern part of the island known as Ormknös is possibly the remains of a small settlement pre-dating Birka by less than a century. It is possible the burial ground belonged to the village on the island, Björkö by, together with two other burial grounds: Grindbacken, north of the village with 25 graves, and Kärrbacka, south of the village with 45 graves. The latter of these sites contains coffins and thus indicates the village coexisted with Birka, survived it, and continues to exist. There were nine farmyards in the village until around 1900, when four of them had to move, and three remain today. Most of the existing buildings are from the early 20th century, with a few individual buildings which are a century or so older.

=== Birka ===
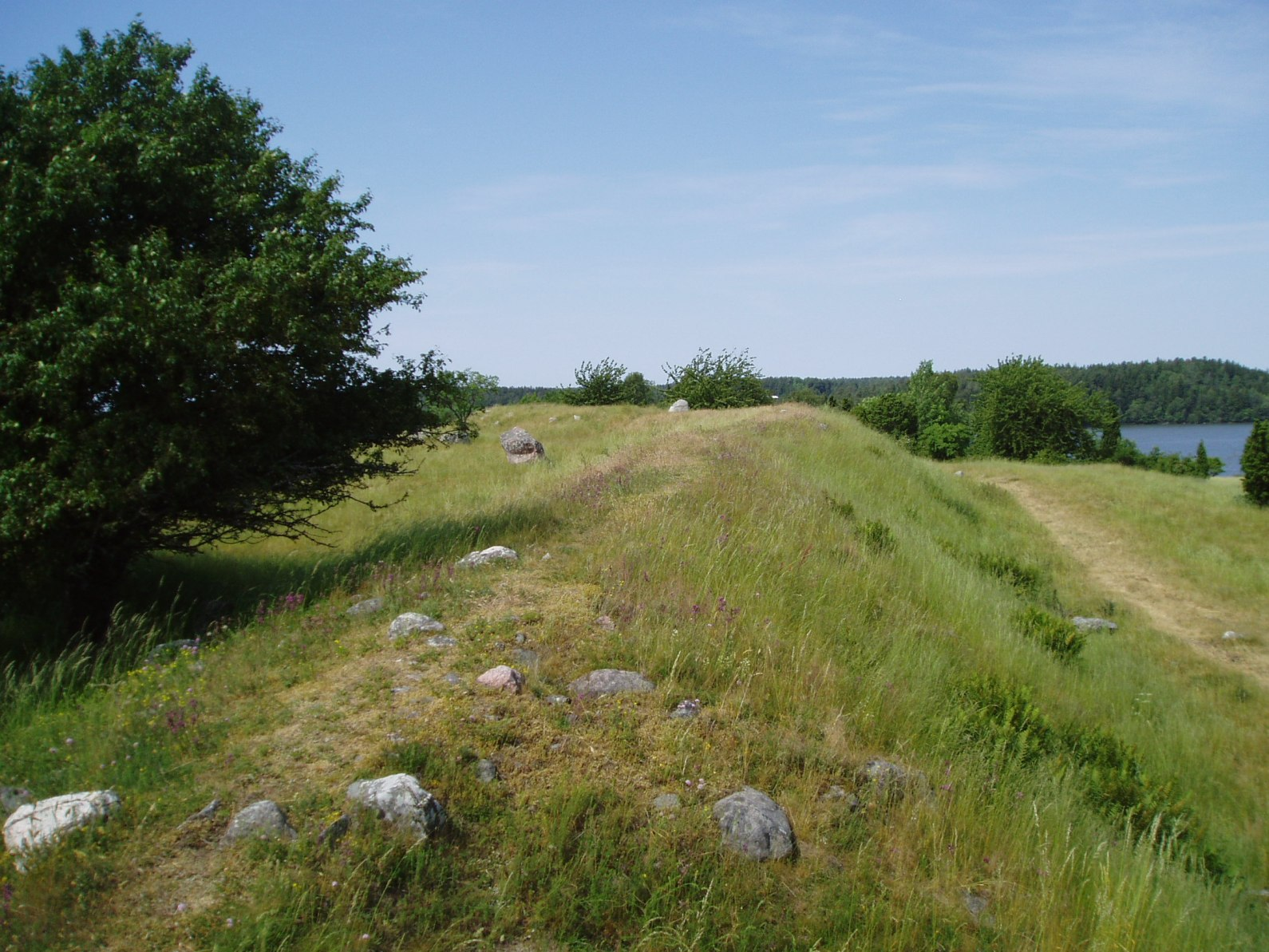
The old earthwork

Birka settlement originated around 800 AD on the shores of the strait separating Björkö and Adelsö, today a pasture-ground known as Bystan covering some 12 ha. The area is still delimited by the ancient defensive earthwork, which once must have stretched farther south to the hill fort at Borgberget. In the water adjacent to Birka are the remains of poles believed to have served as a naval defense line. Around the earthwork three large burial grounds belonging to Birka have been found. The north-easternmost and largest is Hemlanden with some 1,600 graves; south of Birka are two smaller burial grounds: Borgs hage with 250 graves and Kvarnbacka with 185 graves. Approximately 1,100 of the 2,000 Birka graves have been excavated. The archaeological finds from the excavations are held by Swedish Museum of National Antiquities in Stockholm.

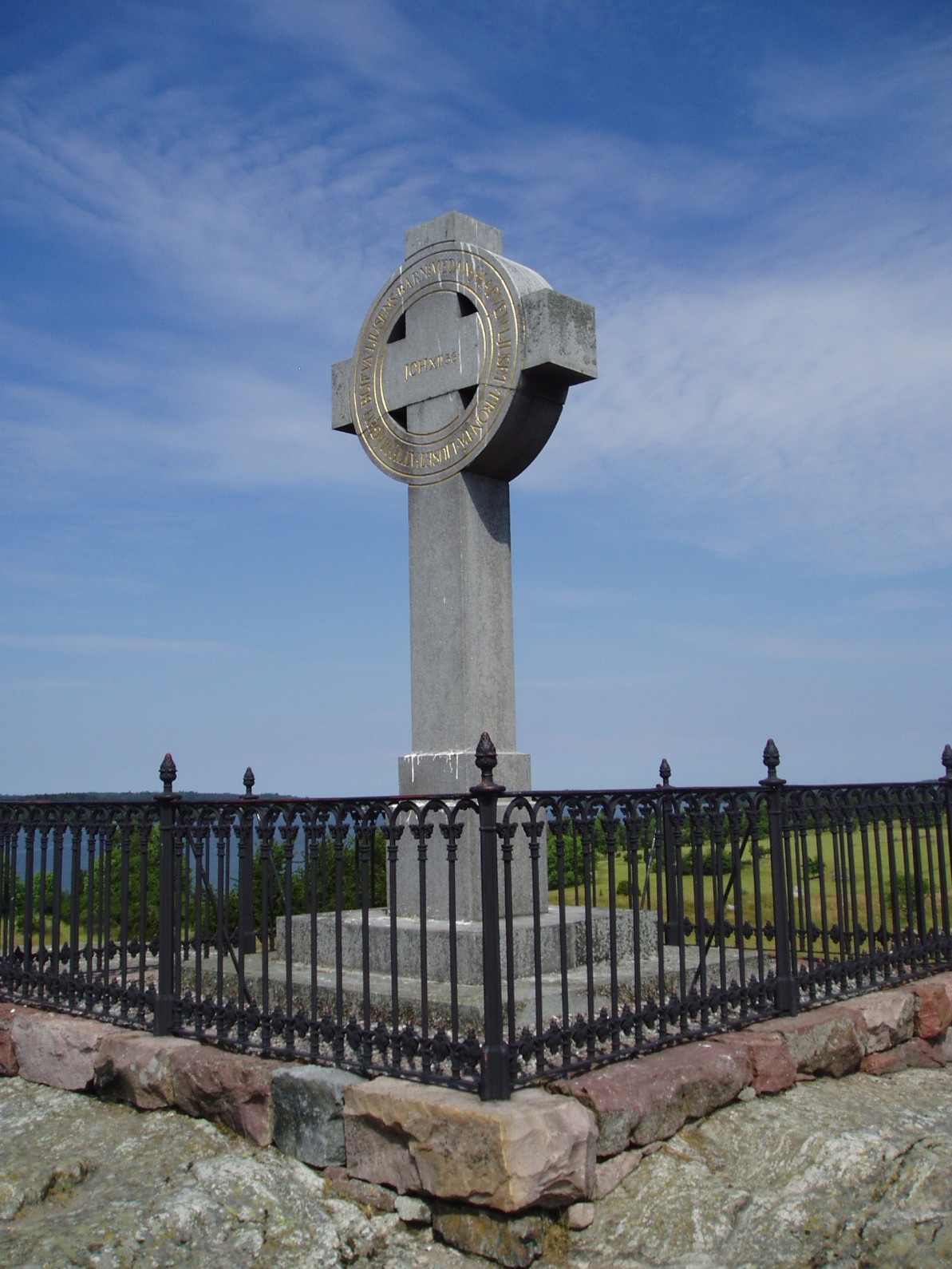
The Ansgar Cross

In 1834, a thousand years after Ansgar visited the island, the so-called "Ansgar Cross" was erected at Borgberget, and a hundred years later the "Ansgar Chapel" was built just east of the village. The small chapel was constructed using sandstone and has a choir, a nave, and a tower. During services, three large gates are opened to allow for an open-air sermon. The chapel is richly adorned with paintings and sculptures by several well-known Swedish artists.

Today, large parts of the northern island have been bought by the Swedish government in order to protect the remains. The area is administered by the Swedish National Heritage Board (Riksantikvarieämbetet), which is attempting to conserve and restore the landscape.

== See also ==
- Mälaren Valley
- Pre-history and origin of Stockholm
- Adelsö Church

== Sources ==
- Bratt, Peter (1988). Mälaröarna - kulturhistoriska miljöer (in Swedish). Stiftelsen Stockholms Läns Museum. pp. 96–100. ISBN 91-87006-06-5.
- Ambrosiani, Björn and Bo G. Erikson: Birka vikingastaden (Höganäs: Wiken, 1992)
- Harrison, Dick Sveriges historia – medeltiden (Falköping, 2002)
- Lindqvist, Herman Historien om Sverige. Fran islossning till kungarike (Stockholm: Norstedts, 1996)
- Wahl, Mats Folket i Birka. På Vikingarnas tid (Stockholm: BonnierCarlsen, 1999)
