= Adelsö =

Island in the middle of Lake Mälaren in Sweden

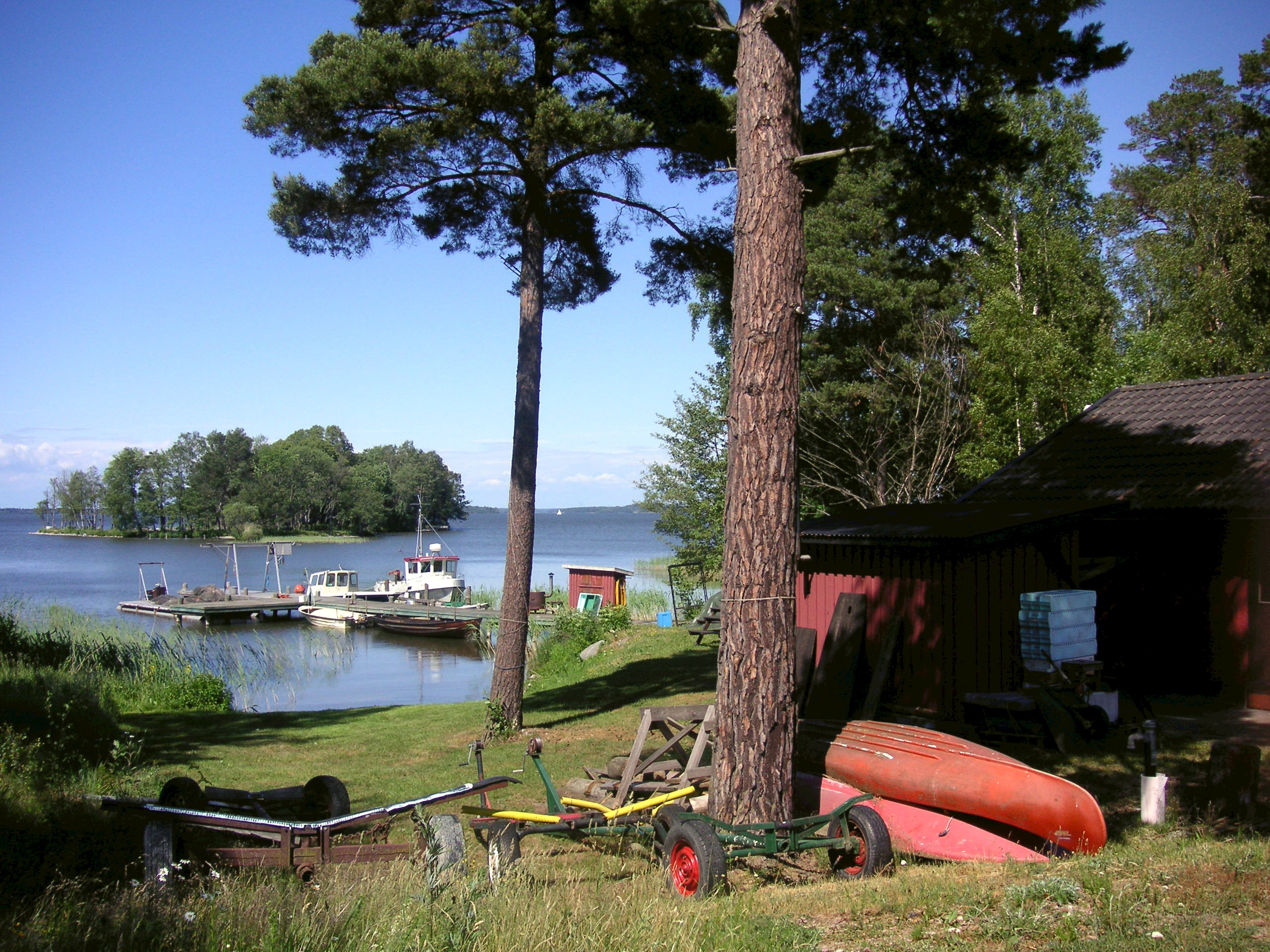
- Interactive map of Adelsö

Geography
- Location: Mälaren
- Coordinates: 59°22′51″N 17°29′46″E
- Area: 26.08 km^{2} (10.07 sq mi)

Administration
- Sweden
- County: Stockholm
- Municipality: Ekerö

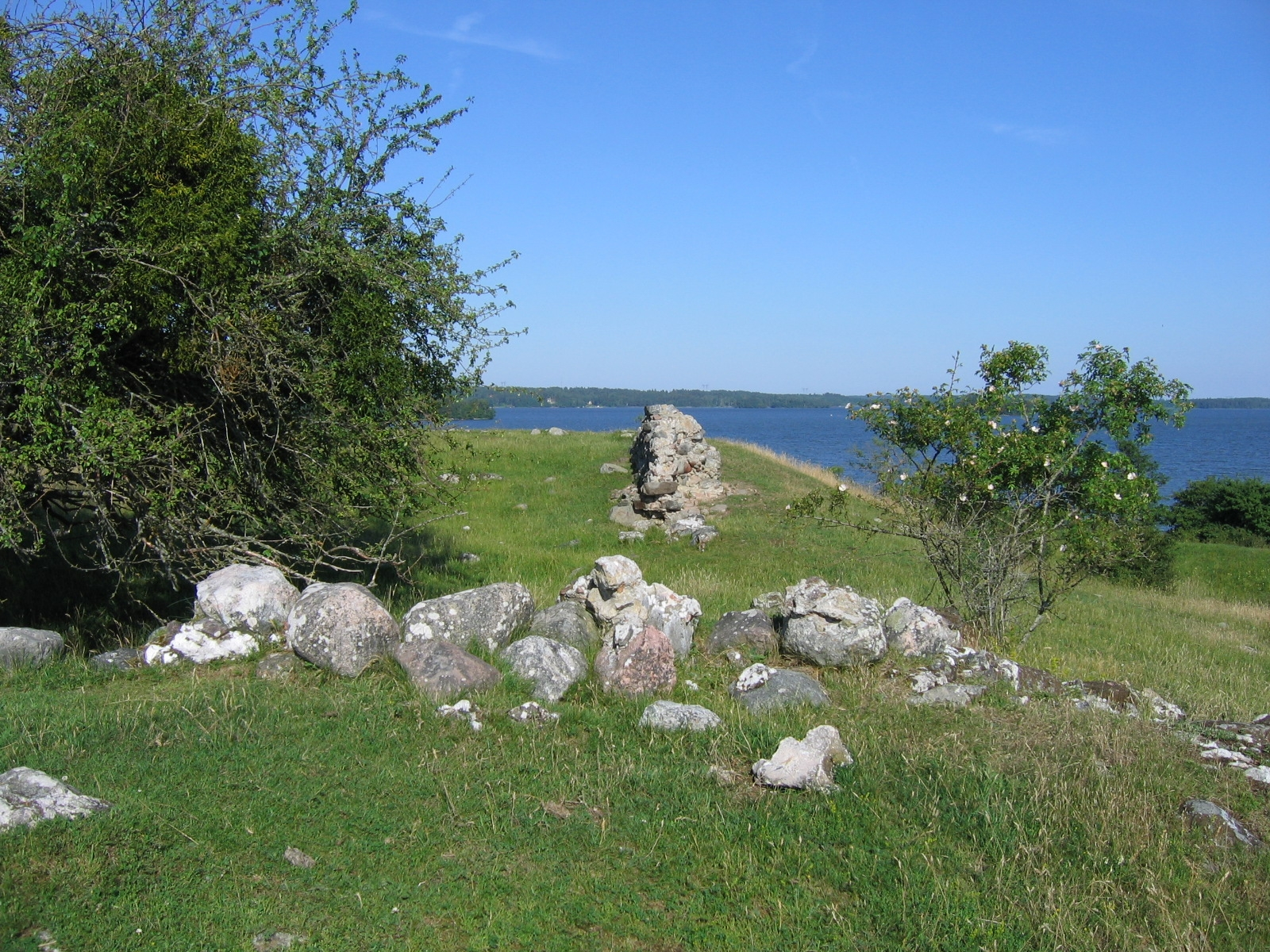
The ruins of the old castle Alsnö hus on the island of Adelsö.

Adelsö is an island in the middle of Lake Mälaren in Sweden, near Björkfjärden. The island is part of Ekerö Municipality and Stockholm County. It is about 45 kilometres (28 mi) by ferry and road west of downtown Stockholm. The administrative center of the important Viking settlement Birka (on the neighbouring island Björkö) was situated at Hovgården on Adelsö. The road network is connected via a ferry link across a narrow strait to the main island of Ekerö.

== Geography ==
The Adelsö landscape consists of pine-clad rocky hills and moraine ridges dotted with fields and deciduous trees, mainly oak. The highest point on Adelsö is Kunsta Mountain, which is 53.2 m above sea level. The top of Kunsta has an outlook tower offering a great view of the middle of Lake Mälaren.

Many edible mushrooms and fruit can be found on Adelsö, including chanterelles, black trumpets, blueberries, lingonberries, juniper berries, cherries, apples, and pears.

== Climate ==
Adelsö has a mixture between a maritime and continental climate. Influenced by its position in the middle of Mälaren, there is seasonal lag in late winter as the water easily freezes to lake ice. In summer, Adelsö is just as warm as inland areas during the day and as a result the island has some of the warmest summers in Northern Europe. This is because Mälaren is shallow and surrounded by a lot of land, which in turn raises lake surface temperatures. Nights are cooler than Stockholm year round. The island is dry by Swedish and European standards, with most precipitation arriving being light besides convection in summer.

Climate data for Adelsö (2002–2021 averages, extremes since 1995)
Month	Jan	Feb	Mar	Apr	May	Jun	Jul	Aug	Sep	Oct	Nov	Dec	Year
Record high °C (°F)	11.2 (52.2)	11.6 (52.9)	17.2 (63.0)	24.1 (75.4)	27.5 (81.5)	30.3 (86.5)	32.3 (90.1)	33.1 (91.6)	26.8 (80.2)	18.4 (65.1)	15.8 (60.4)	13.3 (55.9)	33.1 (91.6)
Mean maximum °C (°F)	6.7 (44.1)	7.3 (45.1)	12.5 (54.5)	18.6 (65.5)	23.9 (75.0)	27.3 (81.1)	29.1 (84.4)	27.9 (82.2)	22.6 (72.7)	15.9 (60.6)	11.4 (52.5)	7.8 (46.0)	30.0 (86.0)
Mean daily maximum °C (°F)	0.7 (33.3)	1.0 (33.8)	5.0 (41.0)	11.2 (52.2)	16.5 (61.7)	20.8 (69.4)	23.5 (74.3)	22.2 (72.0)	17.3 (63.1)	10.5 (50.9)	5.8 (42.4)	2.6 (36.7)	11.4 (52.6)
Daily mean °C (°F)	−1.9 (28.6)	−2.1 (28.2)	1.0 (33.8)	5.8 (42.4)	10.9 (51.6)	15.2 (59.4)	18.1 (64.6)	17.2 (63.0)	13.1 (55.6)	7.4 (45.3)	3.6 (38.5)	0.4 (32.7)	7.4 (45.3)
Mean daily minimum °C (°F)	−4.5 (23.9)	−5.2 (22.6)	−3.1 (26.4)	0.4 (32.7)	5.2 (41.4)	9.6 (49.3)	12.7 (54.9)	12.2 (54.0)	8.9 (48.0)	4.3 (39.7)	1.4 (34.5)	−1.9 (28.6)	3.3 (38.0)
Mean minimum °C (°F)	−16.0 (3.2)	−15.9 (3.4)	−11.8 (10.8)	−5.7 (21.7)	−1.8 (28.8)	2.8 (37.0)	7.4 (45.3)	5.6 (42.1)	1.2 (34.2)	−3.4 (25.9)	−6.6 (20.1)	−11.1 (12.0)	−19.5 (−3.1)
Record low °C (°F)	−27.1 (−16.8)	−29.1 (−20.4)	−25.9 (−14.6)	−9.4 (15.1)	−7.4 (18.7)	0.6 (33.1)	4.5 (40.1)	1.6 (34.9)	−2.9 (26.8)	−7.8 (18.0)	−13.6 (7.5)	−27.3 (−17.1)	−29.1 (−20.4)
Average precipitation mm (inches)	27.4 (1.08)	23.8 (0.94)	21.1 (0.83)	20.5 (0.81)	38.3 (1.51)	51.3 (2.02)	54.2 (2.13)	70.1 (2.76)	38.5 (1.52)	48.4 (1.91)	35.6 (1.40)	34.5 (1.36)	463.7 (18.27)
Average precipitation days (≥ 1 mm)	8	6	6	6	7	9	8	9	7	8	9	10	93
Source 1: SMHI Open Data for Adelsö A, precipitation
Source 2: SMHI Open Data for Adelsö A, temperature

== Demographics ==
Adelsö has about 700 permanent residents, a number that has been quite stable throughout the centuries. Many residents commute to jobs in Stockholm, but there are also farmers and fishermen. During the summer months, the island is popular with tourists.

== Transportation ==
Buses (lines 311 and 312) run from the bus terminal at Brommaplan in the middle of Bromma, to Sjöängen on Munsö. From here, the Adelsö Ferry, a vehicular cable ferry crosses to Adelsö. Bus 312 travels on the ferry and traverses the whole island. The ferry runs every half hour during the day and hourly during evenings and nights. The night ferry runs less frequently during the summer months

== History ==
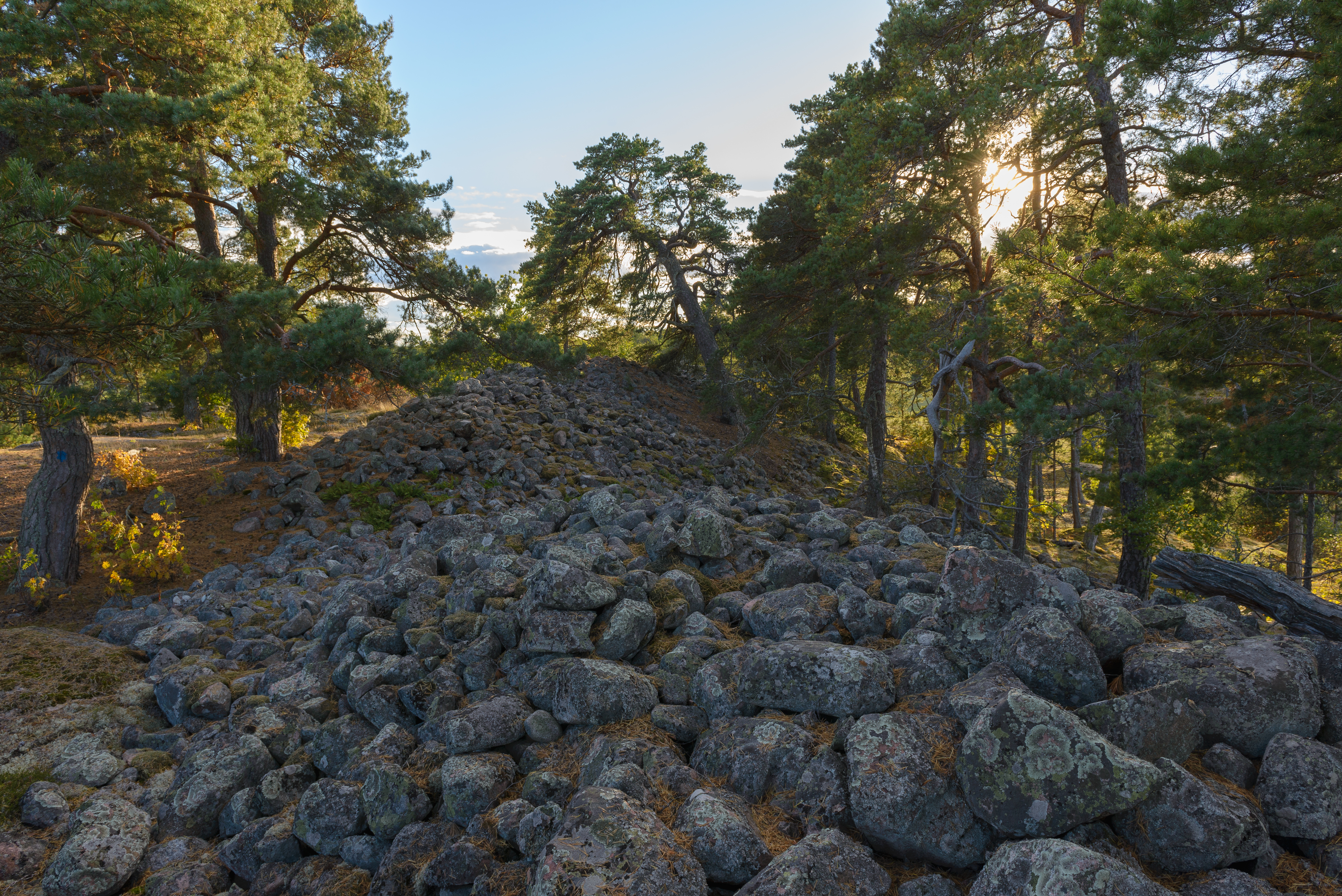
Skansberget fornborg

The history of Adelsö began with the Stone Age. Adelsö at that time consisted of small islands which emerged from the sea at the end of the Ice Age. Mälaren, a freshwater lake, did not yet exist, so the skerries that were to become Adelsö lay beneath the Baltic Sea.

Fishing, bird- and seal-hunting created the foundation for the life of the people living there. Graves from the early and late Stone Age exist, but most of the gravesites date from the Iron Age, mostly the Viking Age. There are also two ancient hillforts (fornborgar) on Adelsö; one of them, situated on Skansberget near Stenby, is unusually well-preserved.

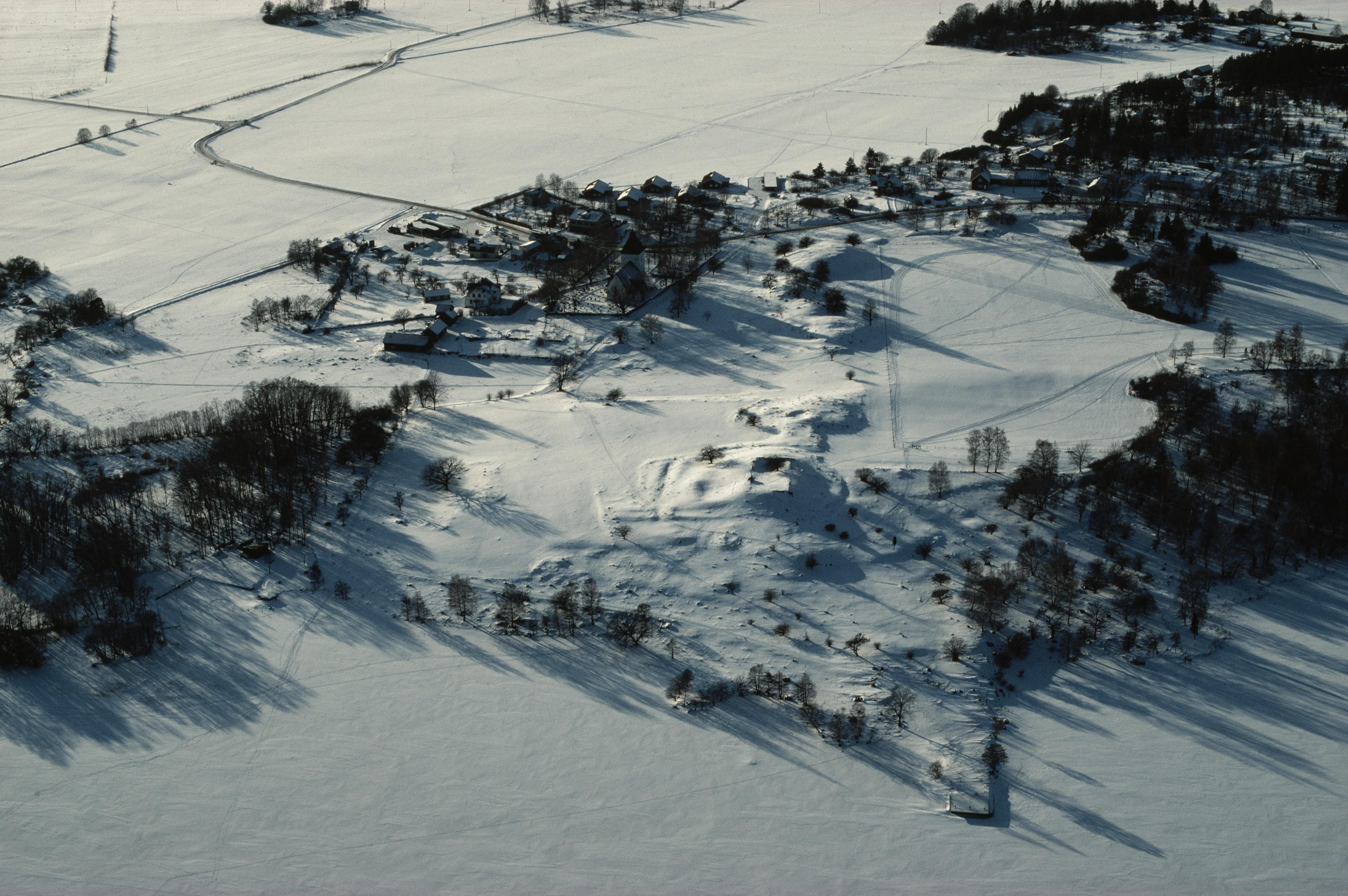
Adelsö barrows in the snow

Adelsö, earlier called Alsnö or Alsnu reflects the importance of the area during the Viking Age. The King's House (Kungsgården) was next to Hovgården and the monarch ruled over the nearby city of Birka. This is also the site of Kungshögarna at Hovgården. Kungs means king or royal and högarna, from the Old Norse word haugr, means mound or barrow.

During the latter part of the 12th century, a Christian church was built next to Hovgården. Birger Jarl's sons built Alsnö hus, a splendid castle where King Magnus Ladulås in 1279 assembled the Meeting of Alsnö. At that meeting, the Ordinance of Alsnö was established, introducing the privileges of the Swedish nobility.

During the Middle Ages, Alsnö hus was used as a summer palace for kings and governors but later fell into ruin. What remains of the castle and several graves near Hovgården was excavated during archeological digs conducted between 1916 and 1926.
