= Ordinance of Alsnö =

13th-century Swedish law

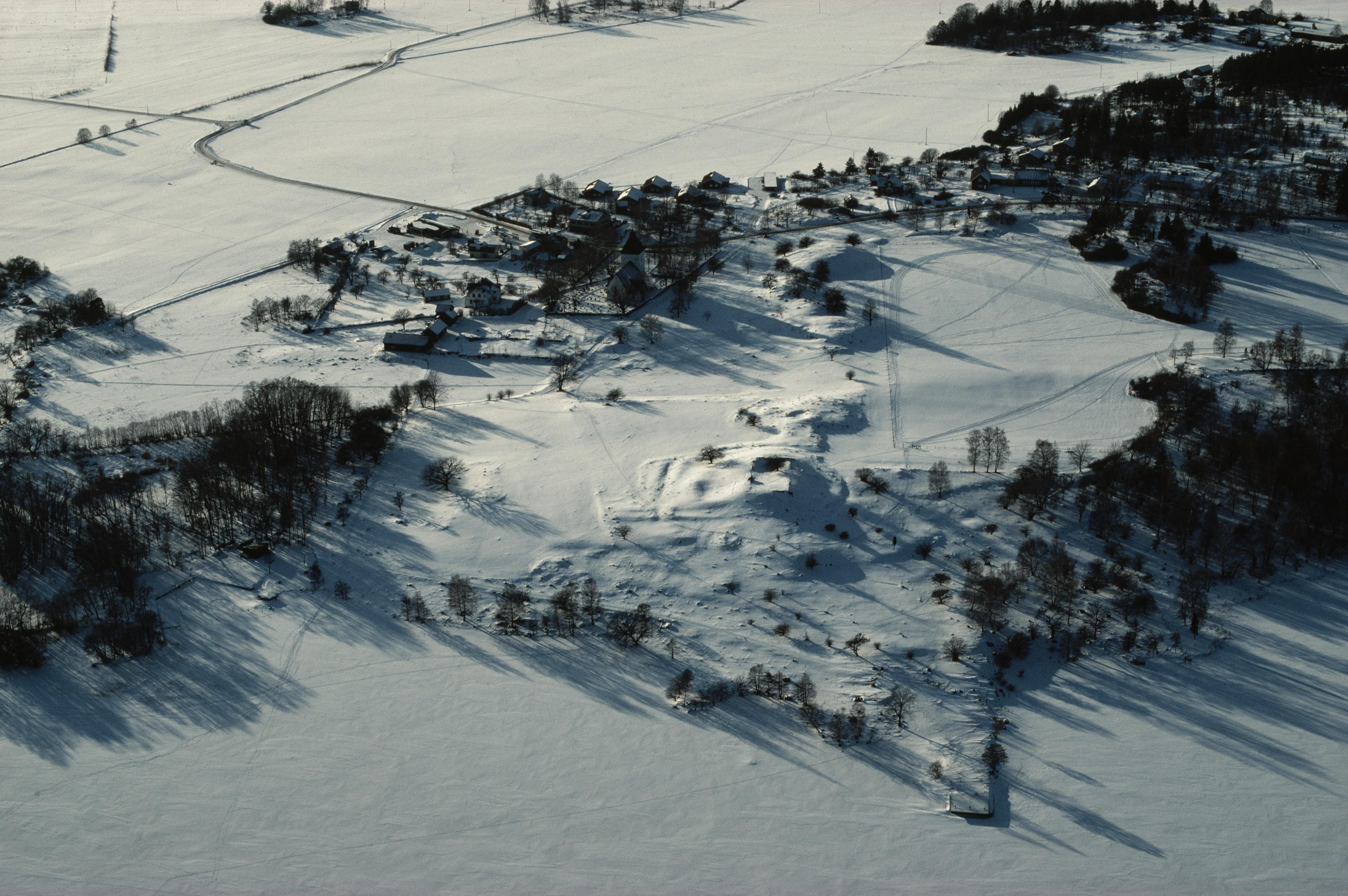
Aerial view of the ruined Alsnö hus in the snow; the shape of the mound is visible

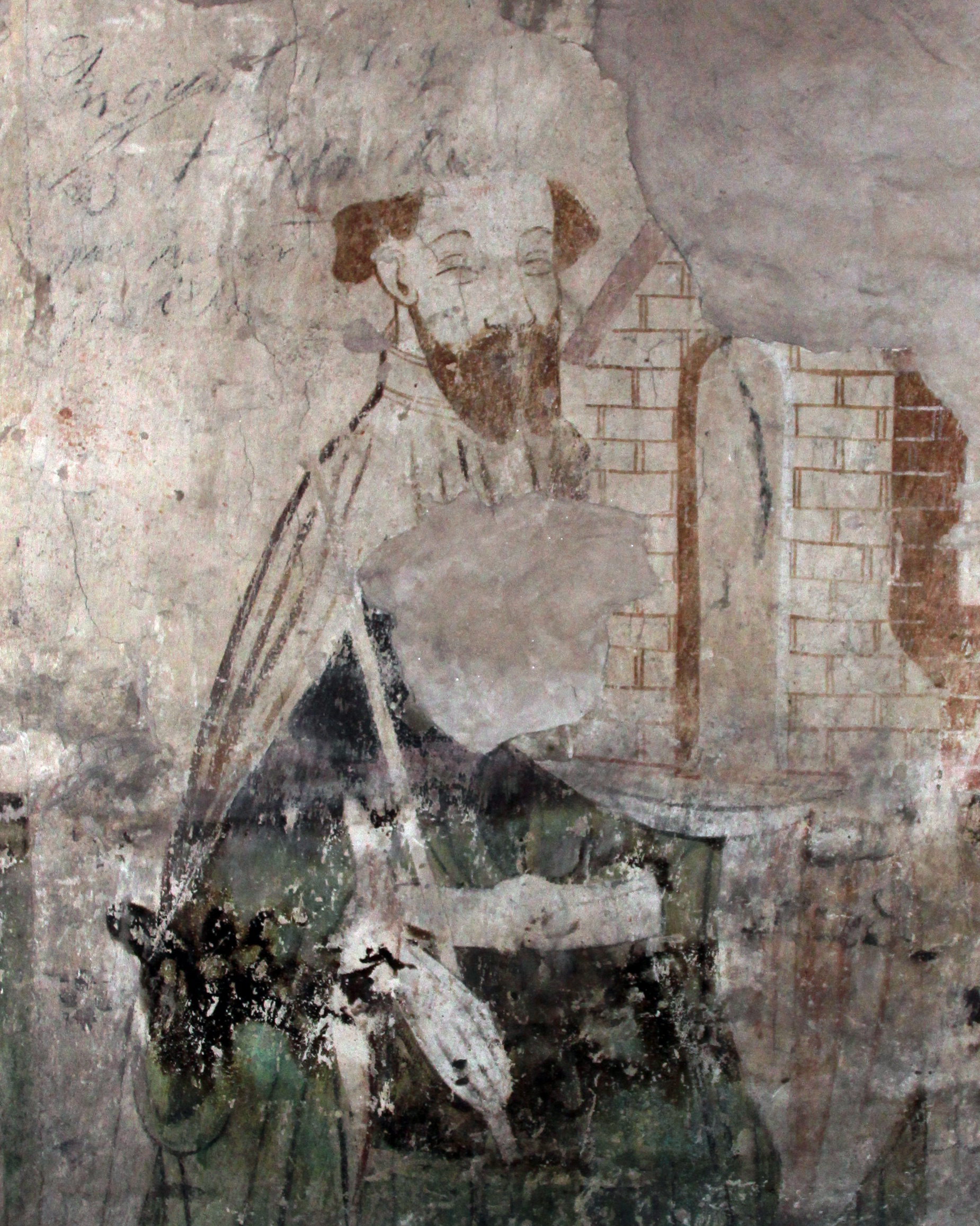
Magnus Ladulås depicted on a 15th-century fresco

The Ordinance of Alsnö or Statute of Alsnö (Swedish: Alsnö stadga) was an act by king Magnus Ladulås of Sweden, issued at Alsnö hus in 1279, giving exemption from land taxation to those nobles who committed to produce a heavy cavalryman to the king's service:

Because it is proper that those who support us with advice and help should have more honor we give to our men and those of our brother Bengt, and all their stewards and peasants and all on their estates, freedom from royal taxes (and penalties), so also all the archbishop's men and all the bishop's men. It is our will also that all the men who serve with war-horses, that they have the same privileges, whomever they serve.

This established the frälse, the tax-exempt secular nobility in Sweden. Another, perhaps less pivotal but more widely known, article of this act reformed the commoners' obligation to provide accommodation to traveling nobles, a privilege that was at the time abused. As Magnus was acclaimed for "protecting the persons and goods of the common people and thus was nicknamed Magnus Ladulås (Magnus Barn-lock)"

== See also ==
- History of Sweden
- Adelsö
