= Uppland Runic Inscription 11 =

Coordinates: 59°21′36″N 17°32′03″E

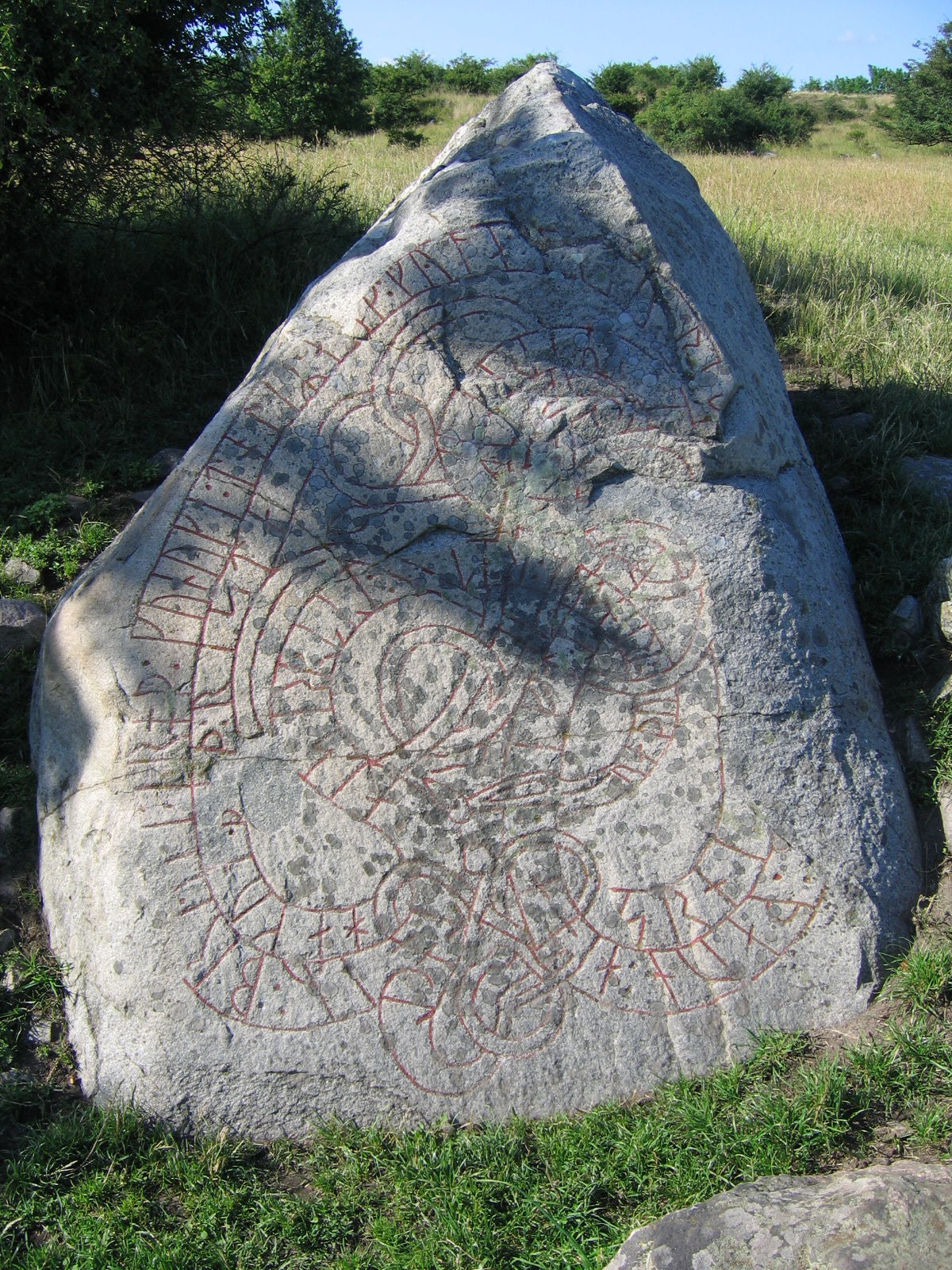
- Created: eleventh century
- Discovered: Hovgården, Adelsö, Uppland, Sweden
- Rundata ID: U 11
- Runemaster: Unknown

Text – Native
- Old Norse : Rað þu runaʀ. Rett let rista Toliʀ bryti i roði kunungi. Toliʀ ok Gylla letu ris[ta] ..., þaun hion æftiʀ [si]k(?) mærki ... Hakon bað rista.

Translation
- Interpret the runes! Tólir the steward of Roðr had them rightly carved for the King. Tólir and Gylla had [the runes] carved … this married couple as a landmark in memory of themselves(?) … Hákon ordered (it) be carved.

U 11 is the Rundata designation for a runestone that is located near the ruins of the old king's dwelling at Alsnö hus near Hovgården on the island of Adelsö in Sweden.

== Description ==
Tolir is described as being a "bryte," which is an old Norse word for a thrall who worked as the thralls' foreman. The word "bryte" comes from "to break," in the meaning of breaking bread, so "bryte" can be interpreted as the person who serves out food.

Gylla was Tolir's wife. Since the text mentions a kunungi or kunungr, Old Norse for "king," Håkon is believed to be the reigning king Håkan the Red, who is generally accepted as ruling during the 1070s.

== Tranlisteration of runic text into Latin letters ==
raþ| |þu : runaʀ : ret : lit : rista : toliʀ : bry[t]i : i roþ : kunuki : toliʀ : a(u)k : gyla : litu : ris... ...- : þaun : hion : eftiʀ ...k : merki srni... haku(n) * (b)aþ : rista

== Additional images ==
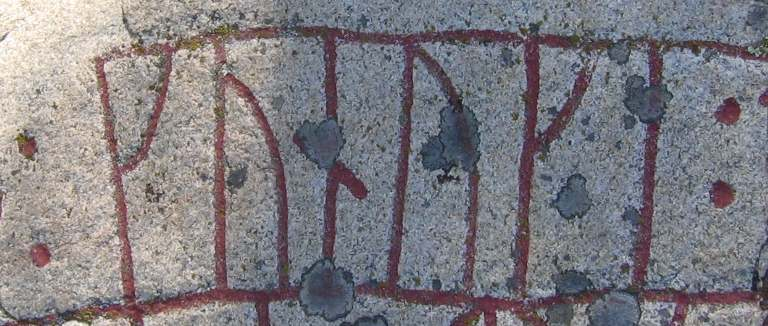
Detail showing the word kunungi or "king."

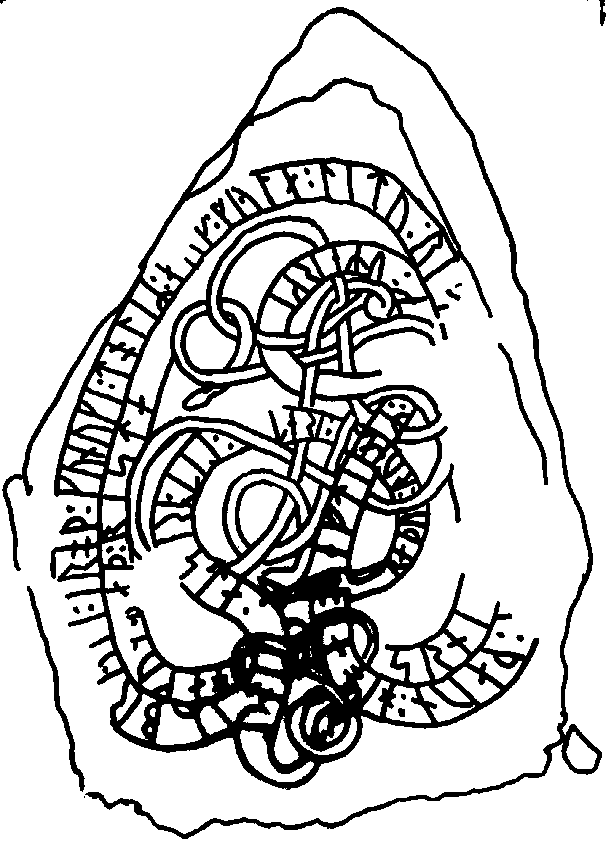
Drawing of U 11.

== See also ==
- List of runestones
