= Danevirke Museum =

Dannevirke Museum
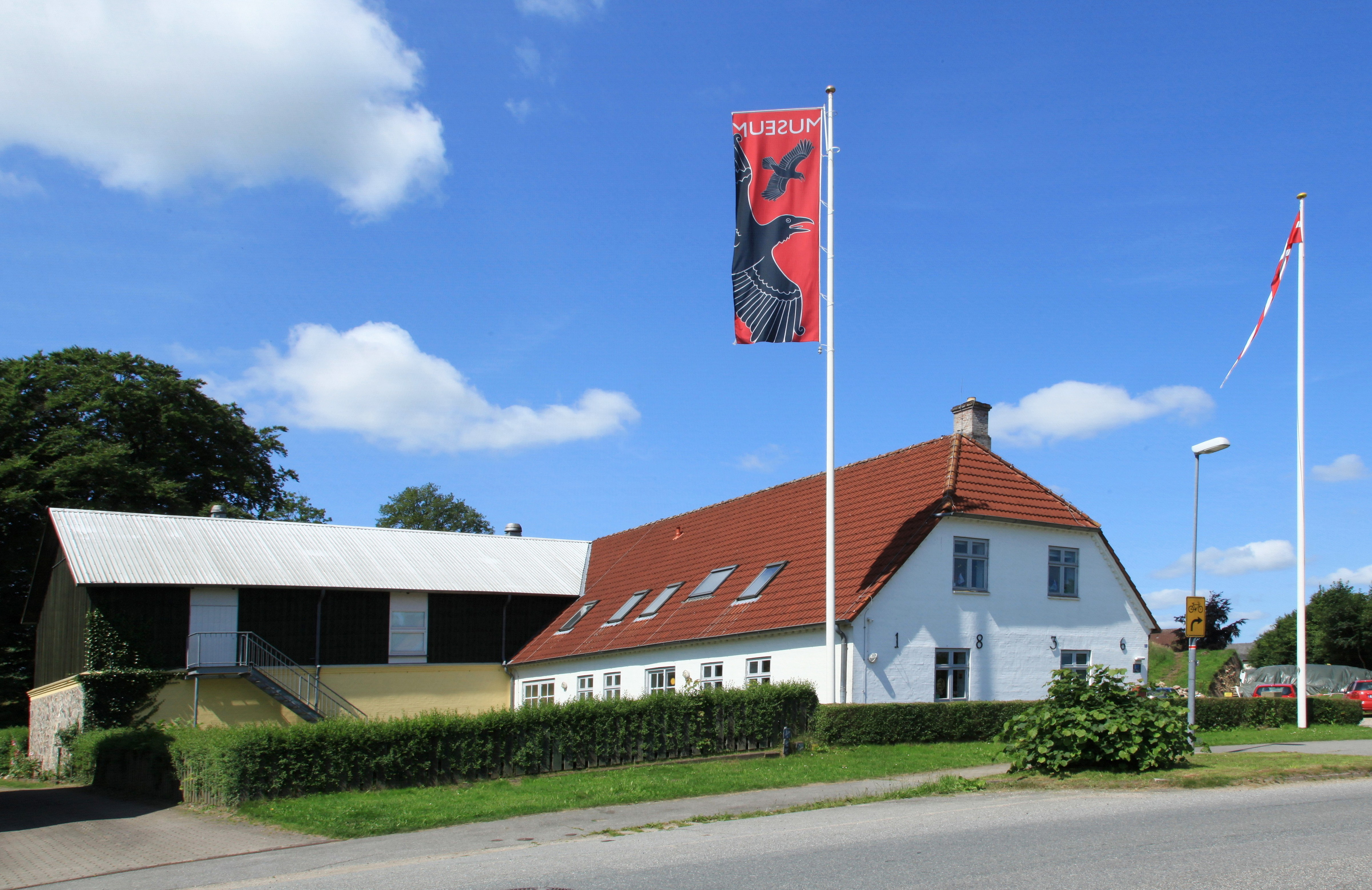
- Danevirkegården, the museum about the defense wall Dannevirke in Dannewerk, Kreis Schleswig-Flensburg in Germany.

- Location within Schleswig-Holstein
- Location: Dannewerk
- Coordinates: 54°29′00″N 9°29′55″E
- Type: History museum
- Website: www.danevirkemuseum.de

Danevirke Museum (German: Danewerkmuseum) is a museum located a few kilometers just outside the city of Schleswig, Schleswig-Holstein, and the text inside the museum is written in both Danish and German. It opened in 1990 and focuses on the history of Dannewerk from the Viking Age to the present, including an archaeological park.
