= Götavirke =

Archaeological site in Söderköping Municipality, Sweden

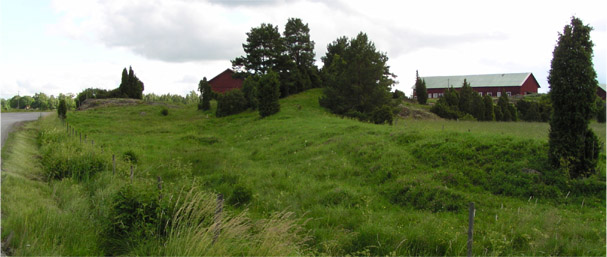
Remains of Götavirke at the farm of Hageby, in Östergötland. On the image the remains of the dyke run from the bottom right up towards the trees, and parallel with the road

Götavirke (Geatish Dyke) are the remains of two parallel defensive walls going from north to south between the villages of Västra Husby (58°29′N 16°10′E) and Hylinge (58°28′N 16°10′E) in Söderköping Municipality, Östergötland, Sweden. The walls cover the distance between the lakes Asplången (58°30′N 16°08′E) and Lillsjön (58°28′N 16°10′E). North of Asplången there are remains of several ancient hill forts that may have been part of the defensive line. South of Lake Lillsjön, the terrain is so hard to pass that it hardly needed any defences.

The walls seem to be constructed to protect the Geatish heartland around today's Linköping from attacks from the Baltic Sea. Archaeological excavations have shown that the walls were constructed ca. 800. Defence constructions were also built along the 20-kilometre narrow inlet Slätbaken that stretches from the Baltic Sea to Götavirke, and even pass it during the Viking Age when the water level was 1.5 metres higher. The measures that Geats had taken to protect the route have no match in Viking Age Sweden.

The wall supported a wooden pale, and behind it are traces of a military road, which makes it similar to the Danevirke protecting the contemporary town of Hedeby. No Viking Age towns are however known in the vicinity of Götavirke.

== See also ==
- Battle of Brávellir
- Offa's Dyke
- Danevirke
- Birka
- Silesia Walls
