= Hedeby 1 =

Viking longship

The Hedeby 1, also known as the Ship from Haithabu Harbour, was a Viking longship that was excavated from the harbor of Hedeby, a Viking trading center located near the southern end of the Jutland Peninsula, now in the Schleswig-Flensburg district of Schleswig-Holstein, Germany.

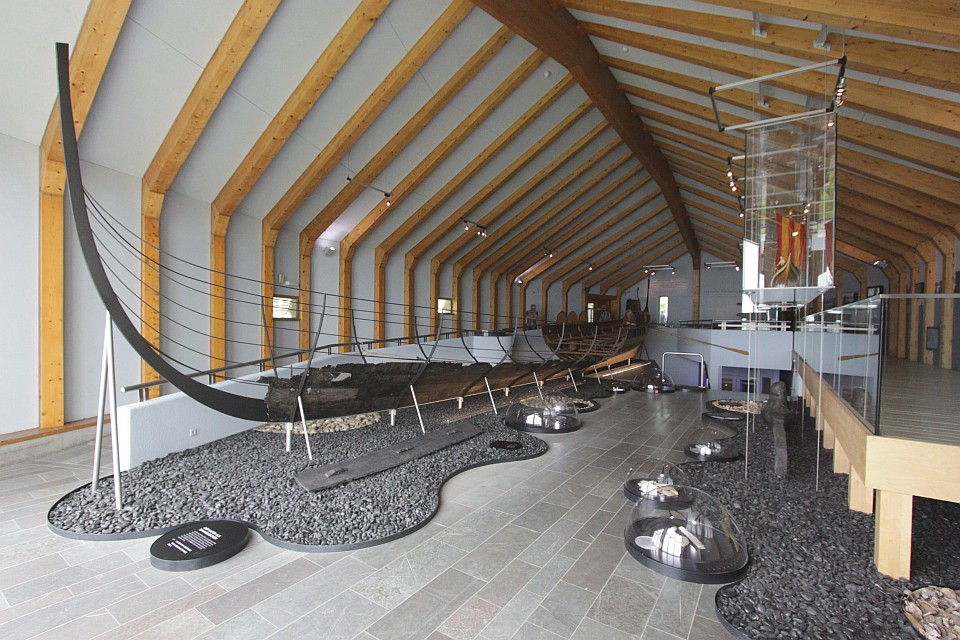
The Hedeby 1 ship at the Hedeby Viking Museum in Busdorf, Germany

== Discovery of the ship ==
It was one of three ships that were pulled up from the harbor of Hedeby with the initial discovery of the ship being in 1953 when a diving team recovered timbers from the floor of the harbor. Excavation would not continue until 1979 when a group of archaeologists under the direction of Ole-Crumlin Pedersen picked up the project and finished the excavation. To do so the team built a temporary dam around the site and pumped the water out from around the site. To dig up the items without both injuring the items and themselves a system of beams and planks were used to cross the bottom of the harbor's floor. This excavation proved much more successful finding parts of the keel (a structural beam that runs down the middle the length of the boat) as well as parts of the frame of the port side and floor of the ship all of which showed ample signs of having been burnt.

== Construction ==
After pulling up the frame and thorough testing of the parts of the ship recovered it was found that the ship proved an important discovery due to its construction. Evidence suggests that the ship originated from the Hedeby area with further evidence suggesting that it was built in the town itself due to the type of wood that was used in its construction correlating with trees in the area. Hedeby the town during the time was under the rule of Svein Forkbeard who we know from a rune stone located in the town, retook the town in 982CE. Who previously had control of the town is contested, with sources saying it was either the Holy Roman Empire and Otto II or it was taken over by Swedish King Erik the Victorious. This knowledge plus further testing of the planks recovered from the ship showed that the ship was built sometime in 985CE. The builder of the ship is not known, but due to the higher quality materials and construction of the ship it is suggested that the ship was built for some type of Danish royal with further evidence suggesting that it was built for the Danish king. For the actual construction of the ship, It was a skeid style longship (Norse: Skeið meaning, that which cuts through the water) meaning that it was a larger ship meant for transporting troops typically used for war. The ship measured overall at a length of 30.9 metres (101 ft 5 in) and a width of 2.7 m (8 ft 10 in) making it the narrowest longship ever found. The ship was very skillfully built using planks that were made of radially cloven oak wood and in some cases, they were more than 10 m (33 ft) long. Over the length of the ship there were 35 frames which allowed for up to 31 pairs of oars between 54 to 62 rowers. Due to the type of materials used as well as the fact that much of its construction when compared to other ships crafted from the time such as the Ladby and Skuldelev ships the quality of the Hedeby 1 was more luxurious, gaining it the description of a longship of royal standard. Evidence further shows that this was often a common occurrence for royal ships to be larger than most longship as those of high standing of the Viking age would often compete with one another about who had the longest and most magnificently decorated warships. This type of royal ship was one of a kind due to its abnormal length and width, as such its construction has been an important insight into how ships of the upper-class in Danish society were built in the late 10th century-early 11th century.

== Decline of Hedeby ==
It was not just the construction that was important for historians either though as the destruction of the ship played a major role in the decline of Hedeby, the town proper. The town of Hedeby was a significant commercial center of the Viking age and acted as an important transit highway for most of the Baltic Sea. As such, the town was constantly under attack from various groups such as the Holy Roman Empire or Sweden, who both wanted the town for its strategic advantage. The Hedeby 1 ship lasted for about 10–20 years, having been used fairly frequently as told by the wear and tear found on the ship. During the time of its life Hedeby was flourishing as a trading town It eventually met its end sometime between the years 990 and 1010 as it was used as a fire ship (a large wooden vessel set on fire to be used against enemy ships during a ramming) in an attack on the town of Hedeby. It is not known who exactly attacked the town, but evidence from Skaldic verse and rune stones shows that the town was raided on multiple occasions due to its economic and strategic value. This raid happened sometime around 990 to 1010 and with the destruction of the ship and harbor marking a downturn for the trading town of Hedeby. Due to both its constant attacking, as well as a need for deeper harbors due to a shift to larger ships, most of the functions of Hedeby steadily started to be moved to the nearby town of Schleswig. Hedeby would finally meet its end in 1049 when the Norwegian king Harald Hardruler attacked and burned the city down.
