= Fahrdorf =

Municipality in Schleswig-Holstein, Germany

Fahrdorf Fartorp, Farup
- Municipality
- Coat of arms

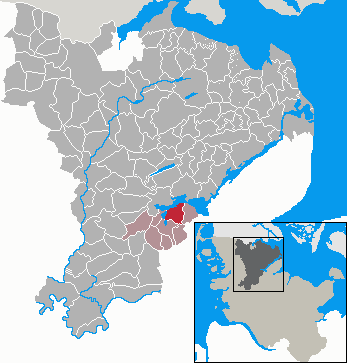
- Location of Fahrdorf; Fartorp, Farup within Schleswig-Flensburg district
- Interactive map of Fahrdorf; Fartorp, Farup
- Location within Germany Location within Schleswig-Holstein
- Coordinates: 54°30′N 9°35′E
- Country: Germany
- State: Schleswig-Holstein
- District: Schleswig-Flensburg
- Municipal assoc.: Haddeby

Government
  - Mayor: Frank Ameis (CDU)

Area
  - Total: 12 km^{2} (4.6 sq mi)
- Elevation: 30 m (98 ft)

Population (2025-12-31)
  - Total: 2,662
  - Density: 220/km^{2} (570/sq mi)
- Time zone: UTC+01:00 (CET)
  - Summer (DST): UTC+02:00 (CEST)
- Postal codes: 24857
- Dialling codes: 04621
- Vehicle registration: SL
- Website: www.fahrdorf.de

Fahrdorf (German pronunciation: [ˈfaːɐ̯dɔʁf]; Danish: Fartorp, also: Farup, Fadrup) is a municipality in the district of Schleswig-Flensburg, in Schleswig-Holstein, Germany. Fahrdorf lies at the Bundesstraße 76 between the cities of Schleswig and Eckernförde. West of Fahrdorf lies the ancient Viking settlement of Hedeby.

Fahrdorf derives its name from the ferry that once crossed the Schlei here and today is shown in the town's coat of arms.

The earliest human settlement, attested through flint and bronze tools, dates back to the Neolithic era and remained existent through the Bronze Age. Danish folklore places the carrying of Jesus Christ by Saint Christopher to a part of the Schlei near modern Fahrdorf.

Throughout the Middle Ages, St.-Johannis-Kloster vor Schleswig owned the Gemarkung occupied by Fahrdorf and nearby Loppstedt, upholding a tax in the form of rye deliveries through local farmers. The first written mention of Fahrdorf by name appears in an arithmetic book in 1575. Under the Duchy of Schleswig, Fahrdorf was raided by the Swedish Army during the Torstenson War. Land was consolidated among residents between 1780 and 1800. Through the 19th-century, Fahrdorf's economy shifted to skilled trades, with the establishment of a windmill to manufacture peat bricks.

Following World War II, Fahrdorf's population increased to around 700 following an influx of refugees from Loppstedt. The town is generally considered a bedroom community of Schleswig, with a sizable tourist economy.
