= Viking Museum Haithabu =

Museum in Busdorf, Germany

Hedeby Viking Museum
- Wikinger Museum Haithabu
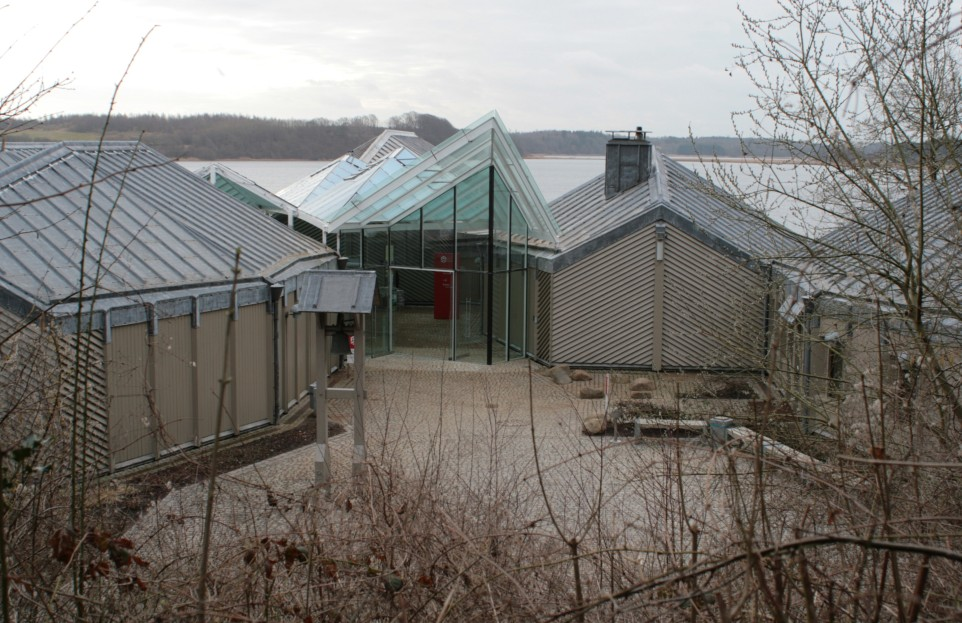
- View of the Viking Museum in 2010
- Location: Busdorf, Schleswig-Holstein, Germany
- Coordinates: 54°29′49″N 9°34′10″E
- Website: haithabu.de/en/homepage

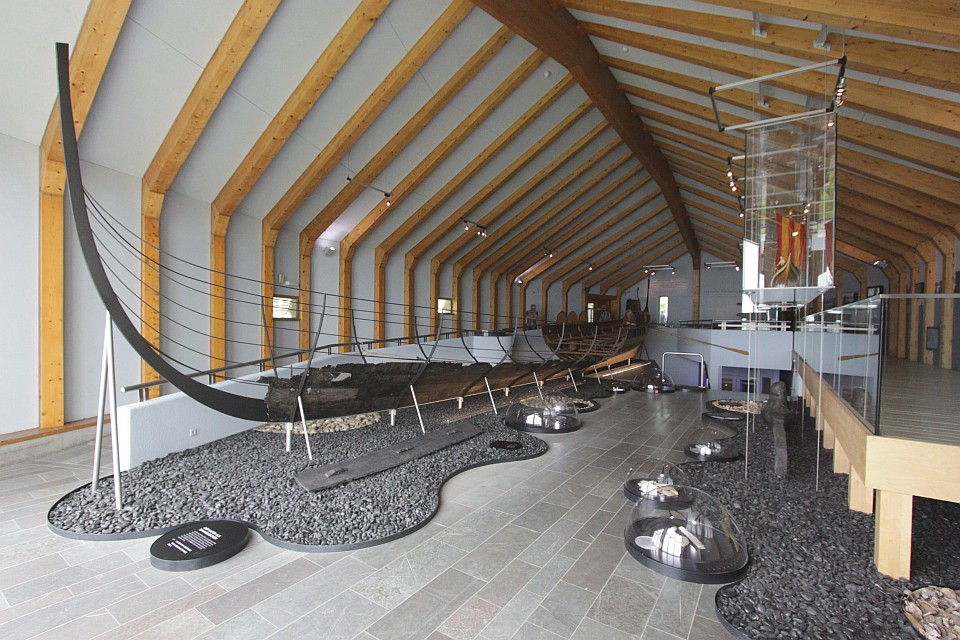
The Hedeby 1 longship

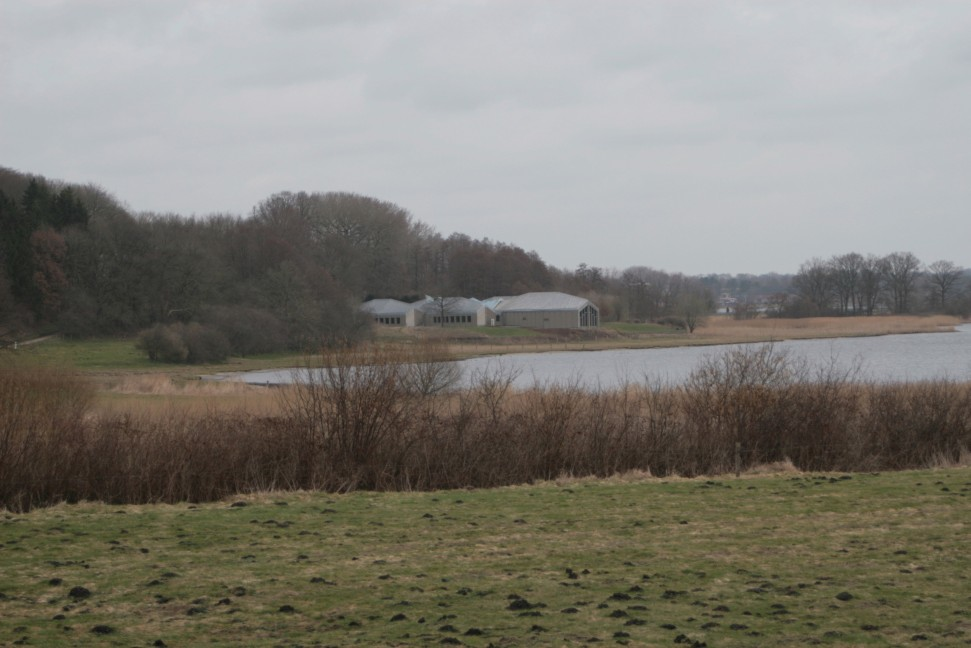
View of the Viking Museum in 2010

The Hedeby Viking Museum (German: Wikinger Museum Haithabu) is a museum near the site of Hedeby, a former medieval city in Schleswig-Holstein, Germany focusing on the Viking Age history of the region. While the region is now in modern Germany, it was once the oldest city in Denmark until it was ceded in 1864. The museum, located in the Busdorf municipality, features reconstructions of various Viking Age dwellings and ships and houses numerous artifacts discovered during the ongoing archaeological research of the area.
