= Haddeby =

- Amt
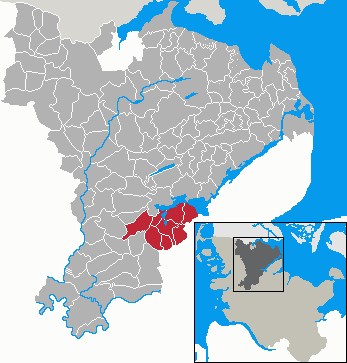
- Map of Schleswig-Flensburg highlighting Haddeby
- Interactive map of Haddeby
- Location within Germany Location within Schleswig-Holstein
- Coordinates: 54°28′N 9°34′E
- Country: Germany
- State: Schleswig-Holstein
- District: Schleswig-Flensburg
- Seat: Busdorf
- Subdivisions: 8 municipalities

Area
  - Total: 79.75 km^{2} (30.79 sq mi)

Population (2025-12-31)
  - Total: 8,837
  - Density: 110.8/km^{2} (287.0/sq mi)
- Time zone: UTC+01:00 (CET)
  - Summer (DST): UTC+02:00 (CEST)
- Vehicle registration: SL
- Website: www.haddeby.de

Haddeby is an Amt ("collective municipality") in the district of Schleswig-Flensburg, in Schleswig-Holstein, Germany. It is situated on the south bank of the Schlei, southeast of Schleswig. The seat of the Amt is in Busdorf. It was named after the now ruined medieval trading settlement Hedeby.

The Amt Haddeby consists of the following municipalities:

- Borgwedel
- Busdorf
- Dannewerk
- Fahrdorf
- Geltorf
- Jagel
- Lottorf
- Selk
