= Treene (river) =

Treene (Trenen)
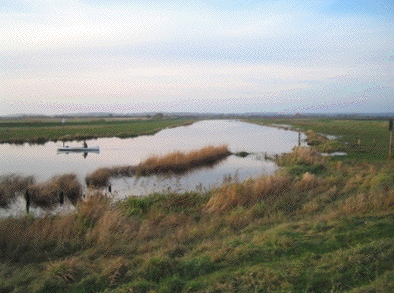
- The Treene near Wohlde

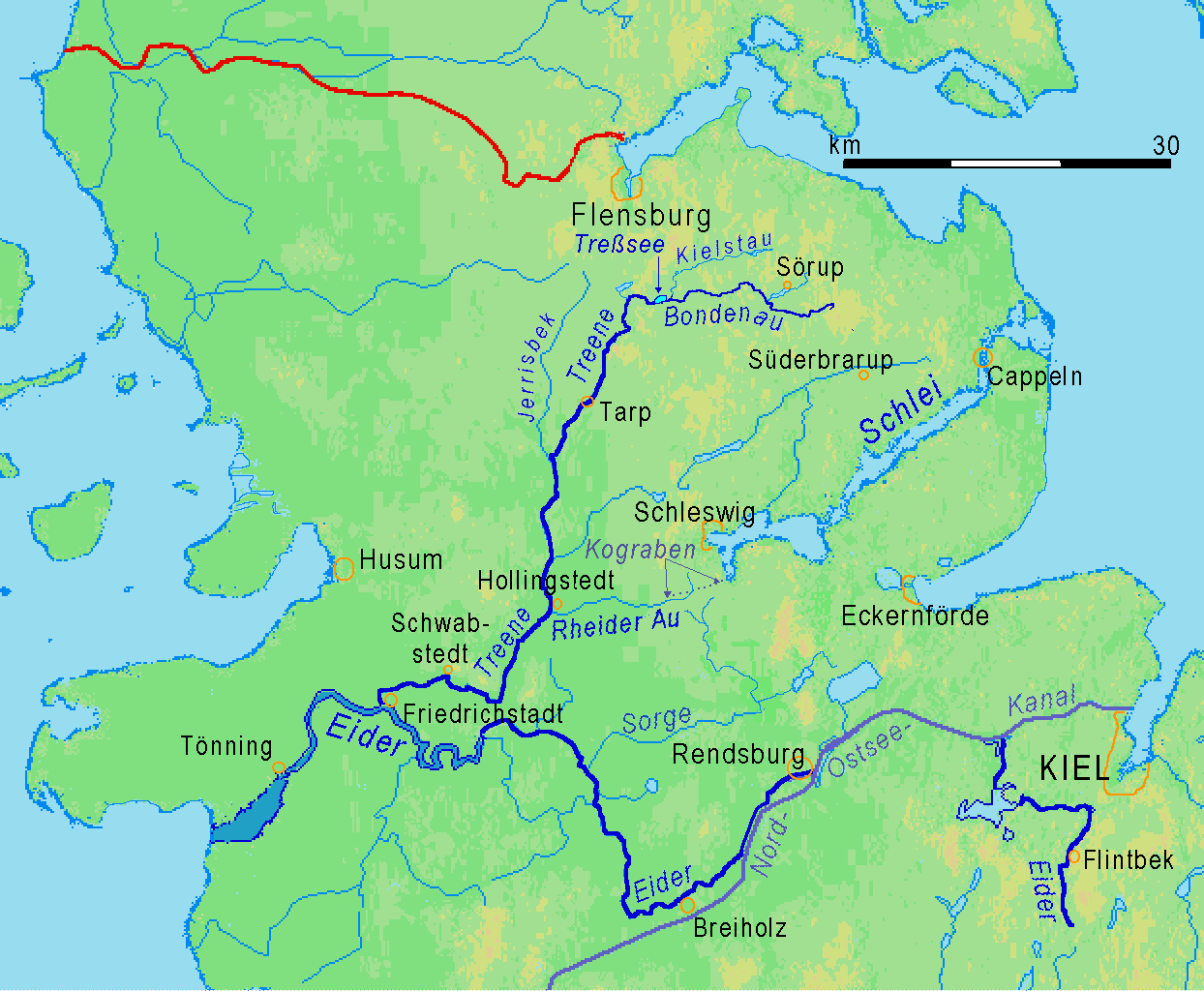

Location
- Country: Germany
- State: Schleswig-Holstein

Physical characteristics
- Source: Bondenau
  - location: Mohrkirch, Angeln
  - elevation: 50 m (160 ft)
- 2nd source: lake Tresssee, Oeversee
  - elevation: 20 m (66 ft)
- Mouth: Eider
  - location: Friedrichstadt
  - coordinates: 54°22′6″N 9°5′9″E
- Length: 95 km (59 mi)
- Basin size: 797 km^{2} (308 sq mi)
- Discharge
  - average: 10.7 m^{3}/s (380 cu ft/s)

Basin features
- Progression: Eider→ North Sea

The Treene (German pronunciation: [ˈtʁeːnə]; Danish: Trenen) is a river, hydrologically 95 km (59 mi) and nominally 73.4 km (45.6 mi) long, in Southern Schleswig in the north of Schleswig-Holstein, Germany. It is a right-bank tributary of the River Eider. It starts in northern Angeln, southeast of Flensburg, and flows mainly south-south-west before joining the Eider near Friedrichstadt.

The upper course are called Bondenau (Danish: Bondeå) and Kielsau (Danish: Kilså). Its source is situated in the ground of Mohrkirch. The name 'Treene' begins at the Treßsee (Danish: Træsø) lake near Großsolt in the district of Schleswig-Flensburg. After about 73 km (45 mi) it reaches the town of Friedrichstadt (in Nordfriesland district). There it is released through valves into the estuary of the Eider, 25 km (16 mi) above the Eider Barrage. It is the most important tributary of the River Eider. Since the construction of Kiel Canal it has been even stronger than the Eider river.

== Details ==
The Bondenau, as the main headstream of the Treene, rises 15.6 km (9.7 mi) east of the Tressee on the peninsula of Angeln, bounded by the Flensburger Förde and the Schlei. So the Treene is an unusual case of a river that rises on a peninsula in the Baltic Sea but flows into the North Sea. The length of Bondenau is 20.43 km (12.69 mi). Half a kilometre before the Treßsee (Lake Tress) it is joined by a stream named Kielstau or Kielsau, by some people considered another headstream of the Treene. Between the Treßsee and Tüdal there is a natural reserve covering an area of 20 square kilometres (7.7 sq mi) called Obere Treenelandschaft that extends along the river. The lower part especially is a reserve for migratory birds ("stork village" Bergenhusen).

The middle section between Langstedt and Treia developed to be a popular canoe area and the lower section can also be used by pleasure craft. In Schwabstedt there is a public swimming site in the river.

== History ==
From antiquity to High Middle Ages, the strip of dry land between Treene wetlands and Schlei had the function of an isthmus. Here the Danevirke secured the south border of Denmark, which at that time was marked by the Eider, more than 20 km (12 mi) further south. And the route Eider - Treene - Rheider Au (tributary of the Treene) - Schlei served as a shipping route between the North Sea and Baltic Sea (see also Hedeby). Whether thereby boats were pulled between Selker Noor (an extension of Schlei inlet) and the Rheider Au 16 km (9.9 mi) on primitive rollers over the 20 m high land ridges (usual opinion), or whether the Kograben, 1 to 2 km south of and parallel to the walls of Danevirke, also served as a shipping canal, has not yet finally been clarified.

== See also ==
- Eider-Treene Depression
- Treene (municipality)
- List of rivers of Schleswig-Holstein

== Sources ==
- Gerd Quedenbaum: Vorflut. Der Eiderverband, ein Beitrag zur Geschichte des Deich- und Entwässerungswesens in der mittleren Eiderregion. Eider-Verlag, Düsseldorf 2000
- Gerd Quedenbaum: Sorge und Treene. Eider-Verlag, Düsseldorf 1984
