= Jagel =

Jagel Jagel/Hjagel
- Municipality
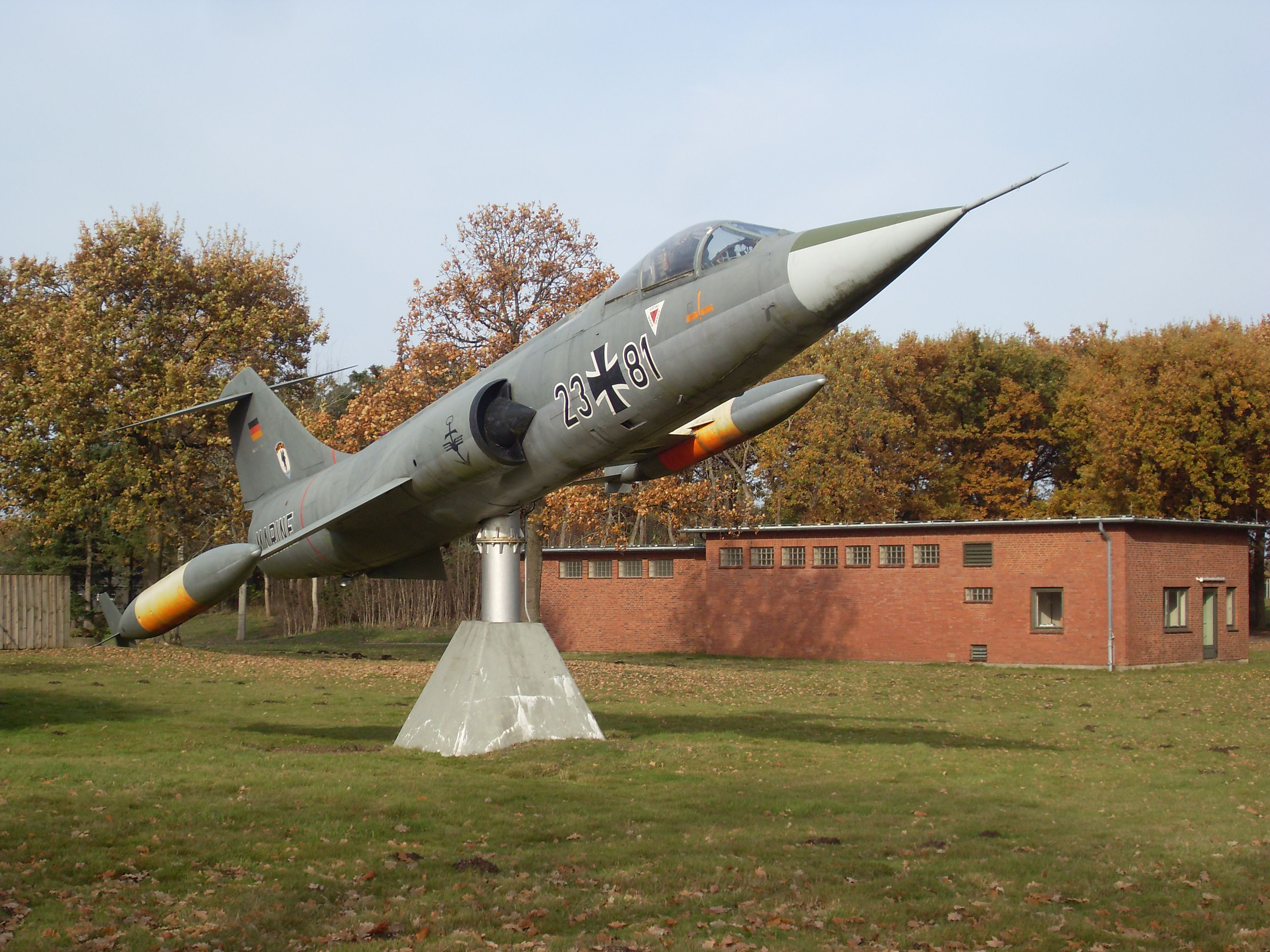
- Schleswig Air Base in Jagel

- Coat of arms

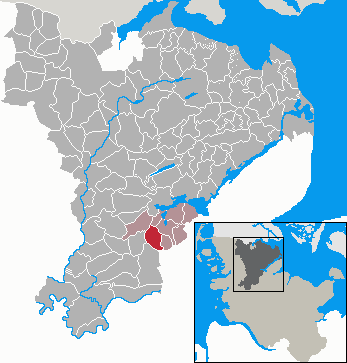
- Location of Jagel within Schleswig-Flensburg district
- Interactive map of Jagel
- Location within Germany Location within Schleswig-Holstein
- Coordinates: 54°27′N 9°31′E
- Country: Germany
- State: Schleswig-Holstein
- District: Schleswig-Flensburg
- Municipal assoc.: Haddeby

Government
  - Mayor: Jörg Meier

Area
  - Total: 11.89 km^{2} (4.59 sq mi)
- Elevation: 18 m (59 ft)

Population (2025-12-31)
  - Total: 977
  - Density: 82.2/km^{2} (213/sq mi)
- Time zone: UTC+01:00 (CET)
  - Summer (DST): UTC+02:00 (CEST)
- Postal codes: 24878
- Dialling codes: 04624
- Vehicle registration: SL
- Website: www.haddeby.de

Jagel (Danish: Hjagel) is a municipality in the district of Schleswig-Flensburg, in Schleswig-Holstein, Germany.

Jagel is also an older German name for Jogaila.
