= Danevirke =

System of Danish fortifications in Schleswig-Holstein, Germany

- Schleswig-Holstein
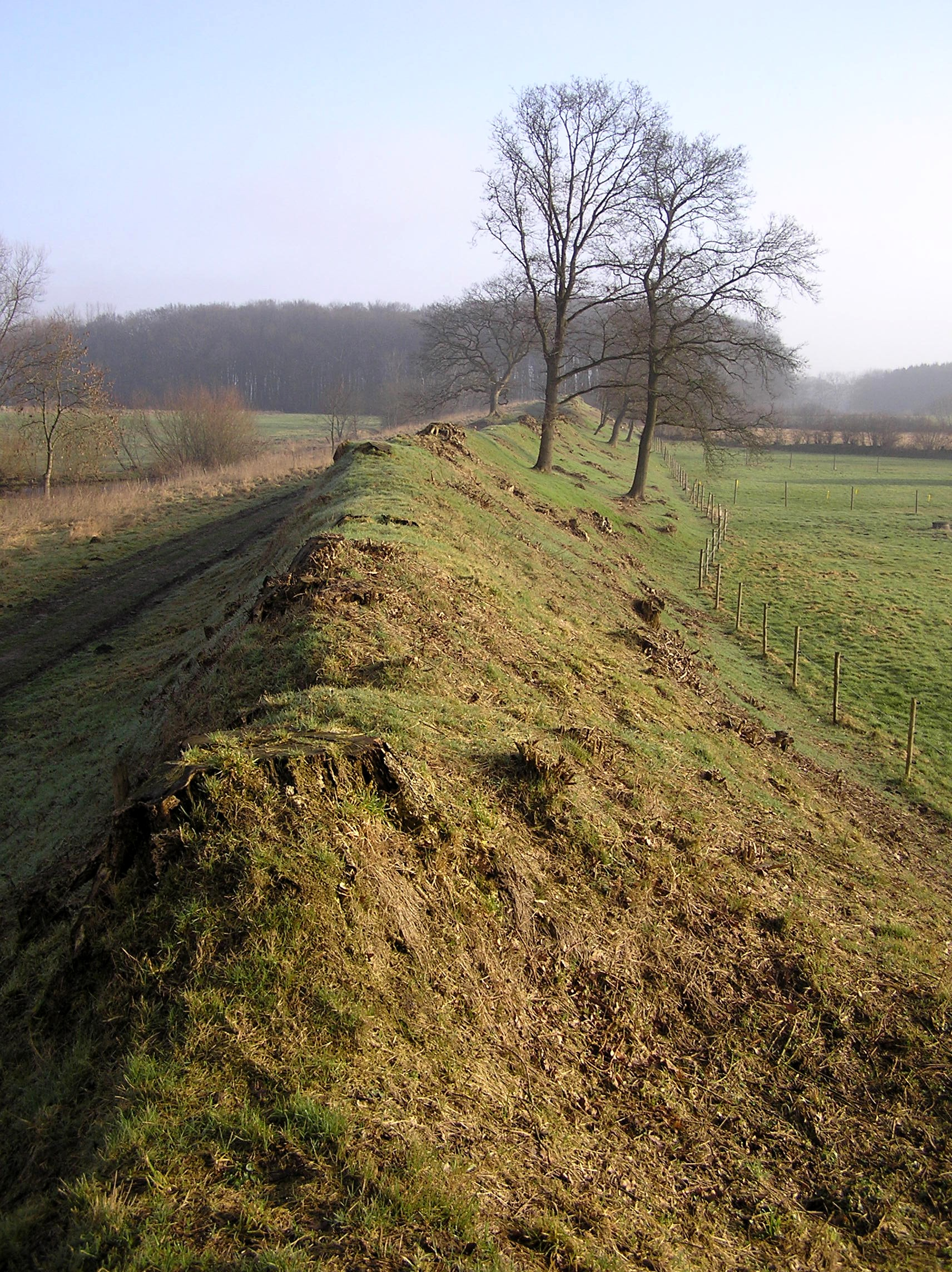
- The Danevirke today

Site information
- Type: Walls, ramparts, trenches
- Controlled by: Danes (historically the Germanic tribe)
- Open to the public: Yes
- Condition: Ruin

Location
- Location within Germany Location within Schleswig-Holstein
- Coordinates: 54°28′N 9°27′E
- Height: 3.6–6.0 m

Site history
- Built: Before 500 AD. Multiple later expansions.
- Built by: Unknown initiator. Expanded by King Gudfred, Harald Bluetooth, Canute IV, Valdemar I and others.
- In use: 974, 1848, 1864.
- Materials: Earth, timber, stone, bricks
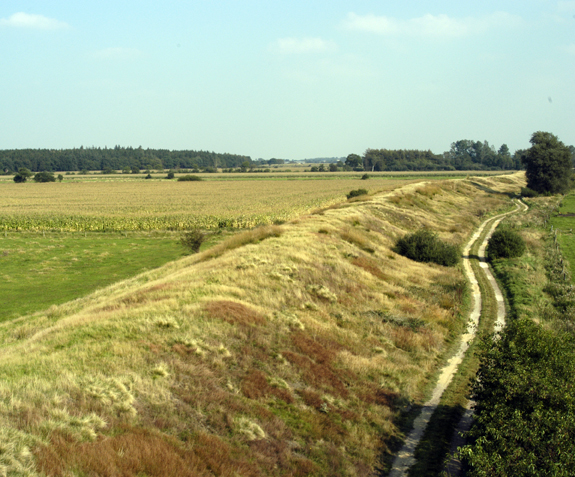
- Wall

UNESCO World Heritage Site
- Location: Schleswig, Schleswig-Holstein, Germany
- Part of: Archaeological Border Complex of Hedeby and the Danevirke
- Criteria: Cultural: (iii), (iv)
- Reference: 1553
- Inscription: 2018 (42nd Session)

The Danevirke or Danework (modern Danish spelling: Dannevirke; in Old Norse: Danavirki, in German: Danewerk, literally meaning earthwork of the Danes) is a system of Danish fortifications in Schleswig-Holstein, Germany. This historically important linear defensive earthwork across the neck of the Cimbrian peninsula was initiated by the Danes in the Nordic Iron Age about AD 650. It was later expanded multiple times during Denmark's Viking Age and High Middle Ages. The Danevirke was last used for military purposes in 1864 during the Second War of Schleswig.

The Danevirke consists of several walls, trenches and the Schlei Barrier. The walls stretch for 30 km, from the former Viking trade centre of Hedeby near Schleswig on the Baltic Sea coast in the east to the extensive marshlands in the west of the peninsula. One of the walls (named Østervolden), between the Schlei and Eckernförde inlets, defended the Schwansen peninsula.

According to written sources, work on the Danevirke was started by the Danish King Gudfred in 808. Fearing an invasion by the Franks, who had conquered heathen Frisia over the previous 100 years and Old Saxony in 772 to 804, Godfred began work on an enormous structure to defend his realm, separating the Jutland peninsula from the northern extent of the Frankish empire. However, the Danes were also in conflict with the Saxons south of Hedeby during the Nordic Iron Age, and recent archaeological excavations have revealed that the Danevirke was initiated much earlier than King Gudfred's reign, at least as far back as 500 AD and probably well before that. Because of its historical importance and testimony to the defense of trade routes in the Viking Age, the Danevirke and the nearby Viking town of Hedeby were inscribed on the UNESCO World Heritage List in 2018.

== Symbolism ==
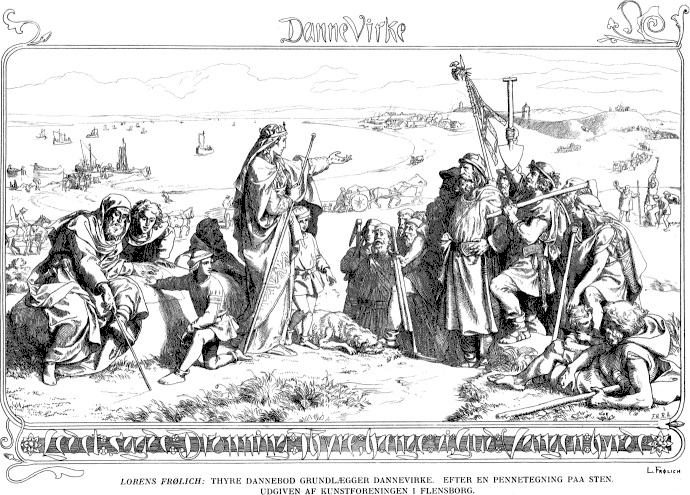
Lorenz Frølich's impression of Thyra Dannebod ordering the foundation of the Danevirke.

Legend has it that Queen Thyra ordered the Danevirke to be built. She was the wife of the first historically recognized king of Denmark, Gorm the Old (reign c. 936 – c. 958).

With the emergence of national states in Europe during the 19th Century, the Danevirke became a powerful symbol for Denmark and for the idea of a unique Danish people and Danish culture. Throughout the nineteenth century, Denmark and Germany struggled politically and militarily for possession of the territory variously known as Sønderjylland or Slesvig by the Danes and Schleswig by the Germans. Two wars were fought, the First Schleswig War (1848–1851) and the Second Schleswig War (1864), eventually resulting in a Danish defeat and subsequent German annexation. In this hostile context, the Danevirke played an important role, at first as a mental cultural barrier against Germany, but soon also as a concrete military fortification, when it was strengthened with cannon emplacements and entrenchments in 1850 and again in 1861.

In the early 19th Century Dannevirke was adopted as the title of several Danish nationalist journals dealing specifically with the question of Danish autonomy vis-à-vis Germany, the most notable of these being published by N. F. S. Grundtvig in 1816–19. In earlier times, the Danevirke had indeed defined a cultural and linguistic border between Danish and German fiefdoms, but the cultural and linguistic frontiers had gradually moved north, and by the 19th century territory as far north as Flensburg was predominantly German-speaking, but remained part of Denmark.

== Archaeological record ==
Archaeological excavations in 1969–1975 established, with the help of dendrochronology, that the main structure of the Danevirke had been built in three phases between AD 737 and 968. It is, therefore, contemporary with Offa's Dyke on the border between Wales and England, another great defensive structure of the late 8th century.

New carbon-14 dating in 2013 has revealed that the second stage started around 500 AD, and the oldest fortifications are even older than that. Previous carbon-14 dating had dated some of the early constructions to the second half of the 7th century, and dendrochronology also suggests that the examined constructions began not very long after 737, about 70 years before the reign of king Gudfred.

== Size ==
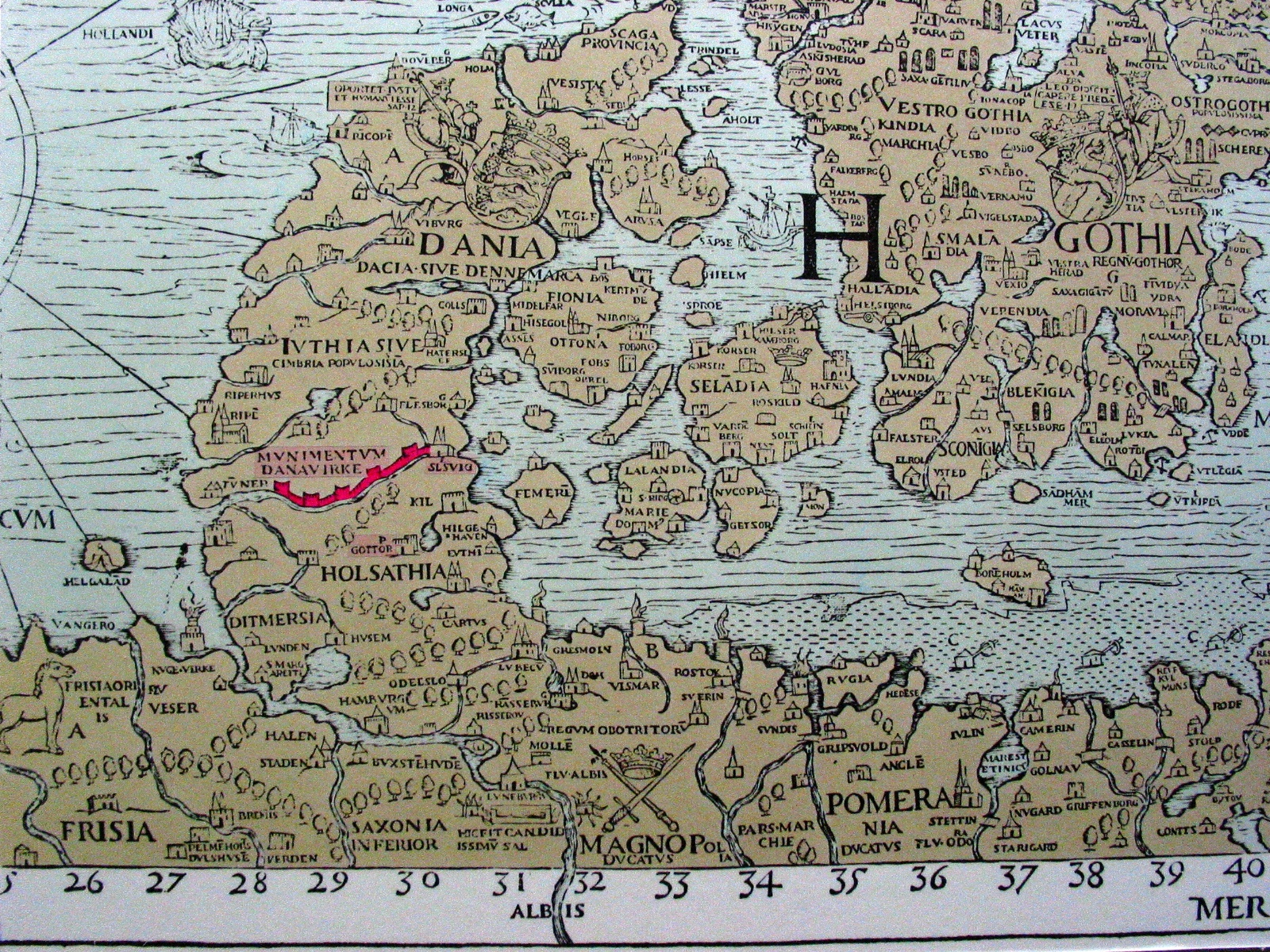
The Danevirke (shown in red) on the 16th century Carta Marina by Olaus Magnus, published in 1539.

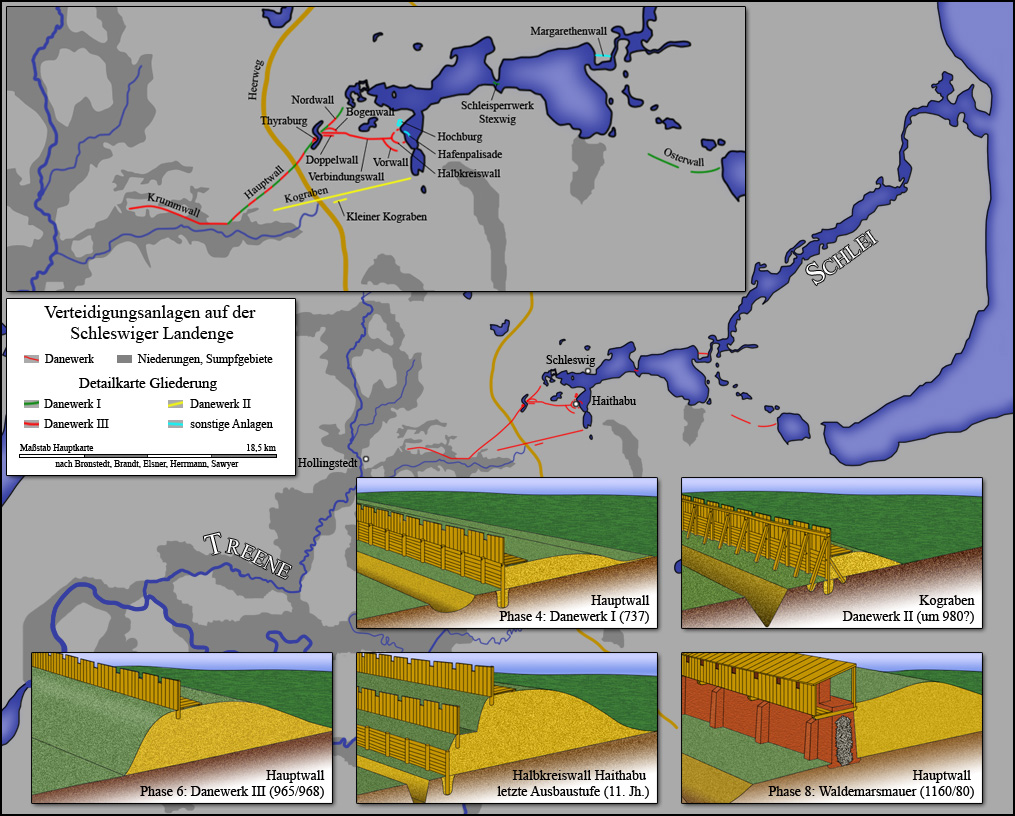
Danevirke: construction phases

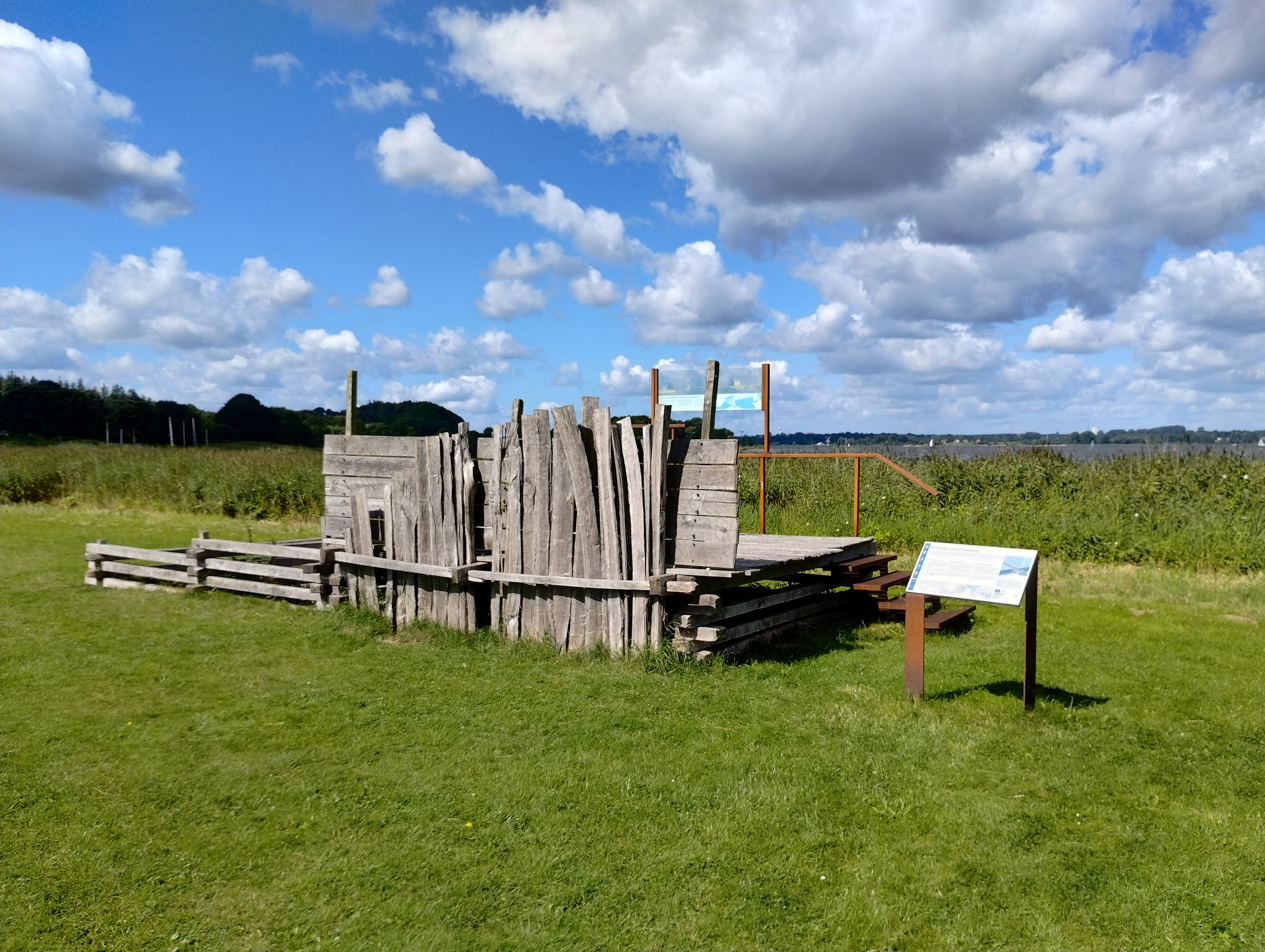
Reconstruction of the Schlei barrier in Stexwig (Danish: Stegsvig) opposite the peninsula Reesholm (Danish: Rejsholm, also: Palør)

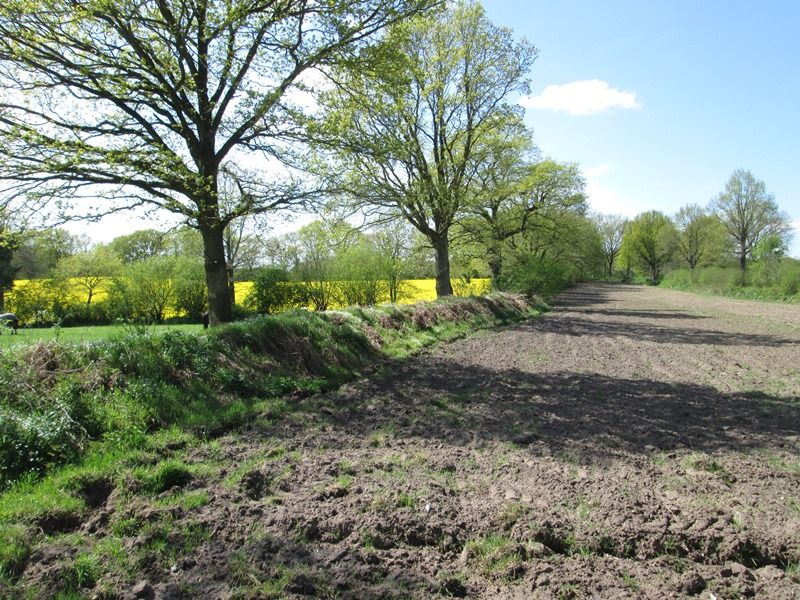
Remains of the eastern wall (Østervolden) close to the city of Eckernförde, protecting the peninsula Schwansen (Danish: Svansø)

The Danevirke is about 30 kilometres (19 mi) long overall, with a height varying between 3.6 and 6 metres (12 and 20 ft). During the Middle Ages, the structure was reinforced with palisades and masonry walls, and was used by Danish kings as a gathering point for Danish military excursions, including a series of crusader raids against the Slavs of the south Baltic. In particular, the 12th-century King Valdemar the Great reinforced parts of the Danevirke with a brick wall, which enabled a continued military use of this strategically important structure. The reinforced parts of the structure are consequently known in Danish as Valdemarsmuren (lit: Valdemar's wall).

== Stages in the building of the Danevirke ==
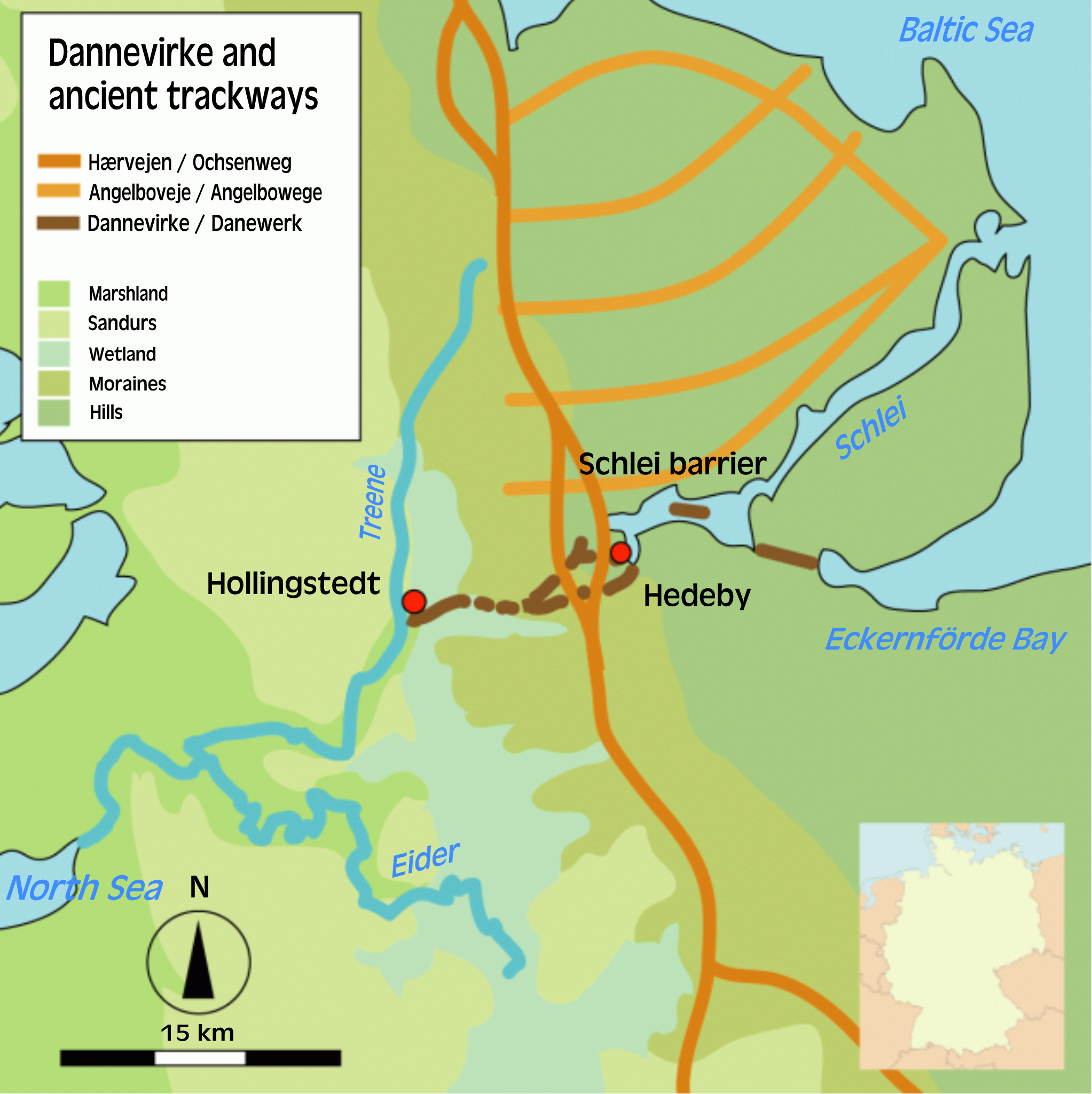
Map showing Danevirke/Danewerk and the Hærvejen/Ochsenweg.

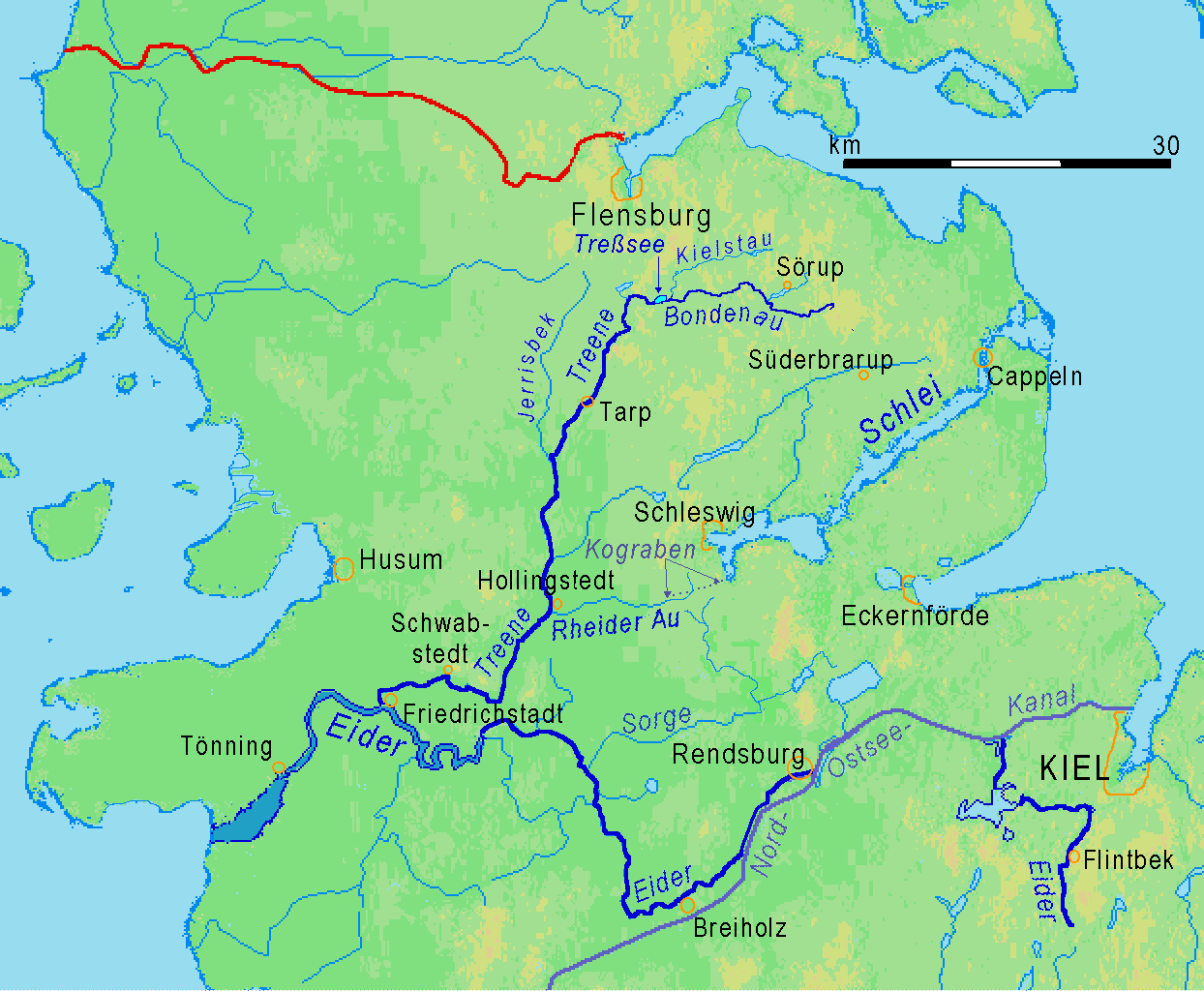
Map of the rivers Eider, Treene, and Rheider Au, and Schlei bay.

- Danevirke 1 – Hovedvolden ("the main rampart"), Nordvolden ("the north rampart"), Østervolden ("the east rampart")
  The first Danevirke was built in five stages, starting about 650, according to carbon-14 dating. The first three stages were simple ramparts of soil, and the fourth stage was a palisade rampart with heavy timber front, built in 737. In the final stages the timber palisade was reinforced with a heavy stone wall around the timber. Work is said to have been started by Angantyr, and continued by Siegfried, and ended by Guðfrið according to annales in 808.
  - Hovedvolden: From Rejde Å (now called Rheider Au) to a small lake called Dannevirke Sø. It was the main segment of the Danevirke. About 2 m high and 12 m wide.
  - Nordvolden: From the northeastern side of Dannevirke Sø, and further north about 7 km.
  - Østervolden: About 3.3 km long, and protecting Schwansen.
  - A 900 m-long (3,000 ft) submerged construction in Slien.
- Danevirke 2 – Kovirke ("cow-work")/Kograben ("cow-moat" or "district moat")
  Built either by Guðfrið or by Harald Bluetooth (if it is the work mentioned as newly made in the Frankish royal annals in 808, then Harald did not build it) it stretched from the Rheide Å about 7 km to a southern extension of the Schlei bay which is now a lake called Selker Noor. Its palisade was about 3 m high, and was a little more solid than that on the first ramparts. The bank of earth behind the palisade was about 2 m high and 7 m wide. It had a V-shaped moat, 4 m wide and 3 m deep.
  The construction period of this rampart would have been some time between 770 and 970.
- Danevirke 3 – Hovedvolden/Hauptwall/"main rampart", Krumvolden/Krummwall/"curved rampart", Buevolden/Bogenwall/"bow rampart"), Dobbeltvolden/Doppelwall/"double rampart", Forbindelsesvolden ("the connecting rampart")/Margarethenwall ("Margret's rampart")
  Hovedvolden was expanded, so that it was now about 5 m high and about 20 m wide. Krumvolden was built through the Rheide Å, and overlapped with Hovedvolden. Forbindelsesvolden closed a gap between Halvkredsvolden ("the semicircle rampart", a bank that protected Hedeby) and Hovedvolden near Dannevirke Sø. Buevolden and Dobbeltvolden protected an important road junction. This wall is connected to most of the building work is attributed to Harald Bluetooth. Arild Hvitfeldt's Danmarks Riges Krønike adds a little detail to the extension of the Danevirke in that time period. "Then summoned (Queen) Thyra (wife of Gorm the Old) Danes from all the kingdom's regions to meet at the border and under her supervision they built a wall of earth and timber from Slien over the moors to Trene. The Scanians received the western section from Karlegat to Trene. Zealanders and Funen dwellers received the section east from Slien (Schlei bay) to Karlegat. Jutlanders provided provisions to the whole army." This would place Thyra's extension sometime before 940. Forbindelsesvolden was attacked by the Saxons of the Ottonian dynasty in 974.
- Danevirke 4 – Hovedvolden/Hauptwall/"main rampart".
  Reinforcement on the Main Wall finished in 954, and a new Forbindelsevold build from 964 to 968. Harald Bluetooth is thought to be the main constructor.
- Danevirke 5 – Forbindelsesvolden, Krumvolden, and Hovedvolden
  Under Canute IV of Denmark (1080–86) Denmark was at war with the German empire. The Danevirke was strengthened at the beginning of the 12th century: the moats were deepened and the ramparts were made higher. A granite boulder palisade wall was built on a part of Hovedvolden.
- Danevirke 6 – Hovedvolden and Thyraborg
  Valdemar I fortified the rest of Hovedvolden with the famous "Valdemar-wall", a 7-m high wall of stones in mortar on a granite boulder base, propped up with buttresses and covered with tiles. This was a large reinforcement, and doubtless deterred many who tried to send an army northwards through Jutland. It was the last true reinforcement of the ramparts. Later Thyraborg castle was built.

The Danevirke began to lose its purpose in the 14th century, owing both to the expense of manning it and to the development of ballistas, trebuchets, and similar siege engines.

== First and Second Schleswig Wars ==
=== First Schleswig War ===
The First Schleswig War commenced on 31 March 1848 but Prussia did not become involved until a naval incident on 19 April. Therefore, on 23 April, General Friedrich von Wrangel marched his 12,000 Prussian troops upon weak Danish resistance at the Danevirke entrenchment and, after a short engagement near the town of Dannewerk, drove the Danish army into retreat and seized the city of Schleswig. An armistice signed on 2 August 1848 caused the Prussians to evacuate Schleswig-Holstein but did not end the war. Further engagements in the next two years saw fighting in the vicinity of the Danevirke but not directly involving it. Final peace was signed on 8 May 1852.

=== Second Schleswig War ===
The last military use of the Danevirke was during the Second Schleswig War in 1864. Due especially to the above-mentioned emotive nationalist symbolism, public opinion in Denmark and the Danish military had expected the coming battle to take place along the Danevirke. After centuries of abandonment and decay, the Danevirke fortifications were partially restored, strengthened, and equipped with artillery installations in 1850 and 1861. In the Second War of Schleswig, there was some early skirmishing to the south of the Danevirke, but no battle took place at it, as the Danish Commander in Chief, General de Meza, withdrew all soldiers to the trenches at Dybbøl, owing to an unexpected threat of being outflanked, as the Schlei and the wetlands between the Danevirke and Husum had frozen solid in a hard winter and could be crossed easily, and the territory immediately south of the Danevirke had been conquered by the advancing German army. This retreat came as a surprise to the Austro-Prussian army, and almost all of the Danish army succeeded in completing the evacuation. It resulted, however, in the abandonment of important pieces of heavy artillery, and it remains a matter of historical debate why the railway to Flensburg was never properly used for the evacuation. News of the retreat came as a great shock to Danish public opinion which had considered the Danevirke to be impregnable, and General de Meza was promptly relieved of his command. The Danevirke has remained in German possession ever since.

== In World War II ==
Following the Allied invasion of Normandy during World War II, the Wehrmacht feared that a second Allied invasion might take place through Denmark, and contemplated converting the earthen wall into an anti-tank trench to counter this threat. Had the proposal been implemented, it would have destroyed the structure.

Hearing of the plans, Danish archaeologist Søren Telling – aware that all archaeological investigation was under the ultimate jurisdiction of SS chief Heinrich Himmler – immediately telephoned both the head of the SS's archaeological department, Amt für Ahnenerbe ("Office for ancestral heritage"), and Himmler himself. Telling argued strongly against the destruction of an important remnant of "Aryan civilization" and Himmler authorized him to stop the construction of the anti-tank trench. He informed Telling that a written order would be dispatched but that it would take several days to arrive. Telling then drove to the site and ordered the commanding Wehrmacht officers to immediately stop the construction process. When the local Wehrmacht commander refused, Telling threatened him with reprisals from the SS. Construction was called off and Himmler's written order arrived two days later countering the Wehrmacht's original instructions. Telling later settled near the site and considered himself a custodian of it until his death in 1968.

== See also ==
- List of walls
- Hadrian's Wall
- Offa's Dyke
- Dannevirke (town in New Zealand)
- Götavirke (Geatish Dyke)
- History of Denmark
- History of Schleswig-Holstein
- Silesian Walls

== Sources ==
- Andersen, H. Hellmuth (2004). Til hele rigets værn (in Danish). Højbjerg: Moesgård & Wormianum. ISBN 87-89531-15-9.
