= Geltorf =

Geltorf Geltorp
- Municipality
- Coat of arms

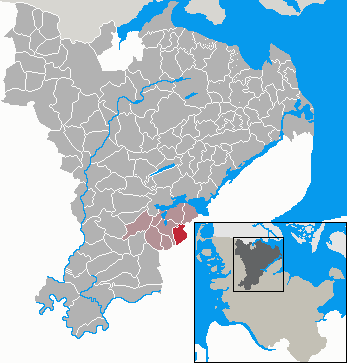
- Location of Geltorf; Geltorp within Schleswig-Flensburg district
- Interactive map of Geltorf; Geltorp
- Location within Germany Location within Schleswig-Holstein
- Coordinates: 54°28′N 9°37′E
- Country: Germany
- State: Schleswig-Holstein
- District: Schleswig-Flensburg
- Municipal assoc.: Haddeby

Government
  - Mayor: Johannes Meggers

Area
  - Total: 8.08 km^{2} (3.12 sq mi)
- Elevation: 25 m (82 ft)

Population (2025-12-31)
  - Total: 353
  - Density: 43.7/km^{2} (113/sq mi)
- Time zone: UTC+01:00 (CET)
  - Summer (DST): UTC+02:00 (CEST)
- Postal codes: 24884
- Dialling codes: 04621
- Vehicle registration: SL
- Website: www.haddeby.de

Geltorf (Danish: Geltorp) is a municipality in the district of Schleswig-Flensburg, in Schleswig-Holstein, Germany.
