= Rheider Au =

Rheider Au (Rejde å, Spangebæk)
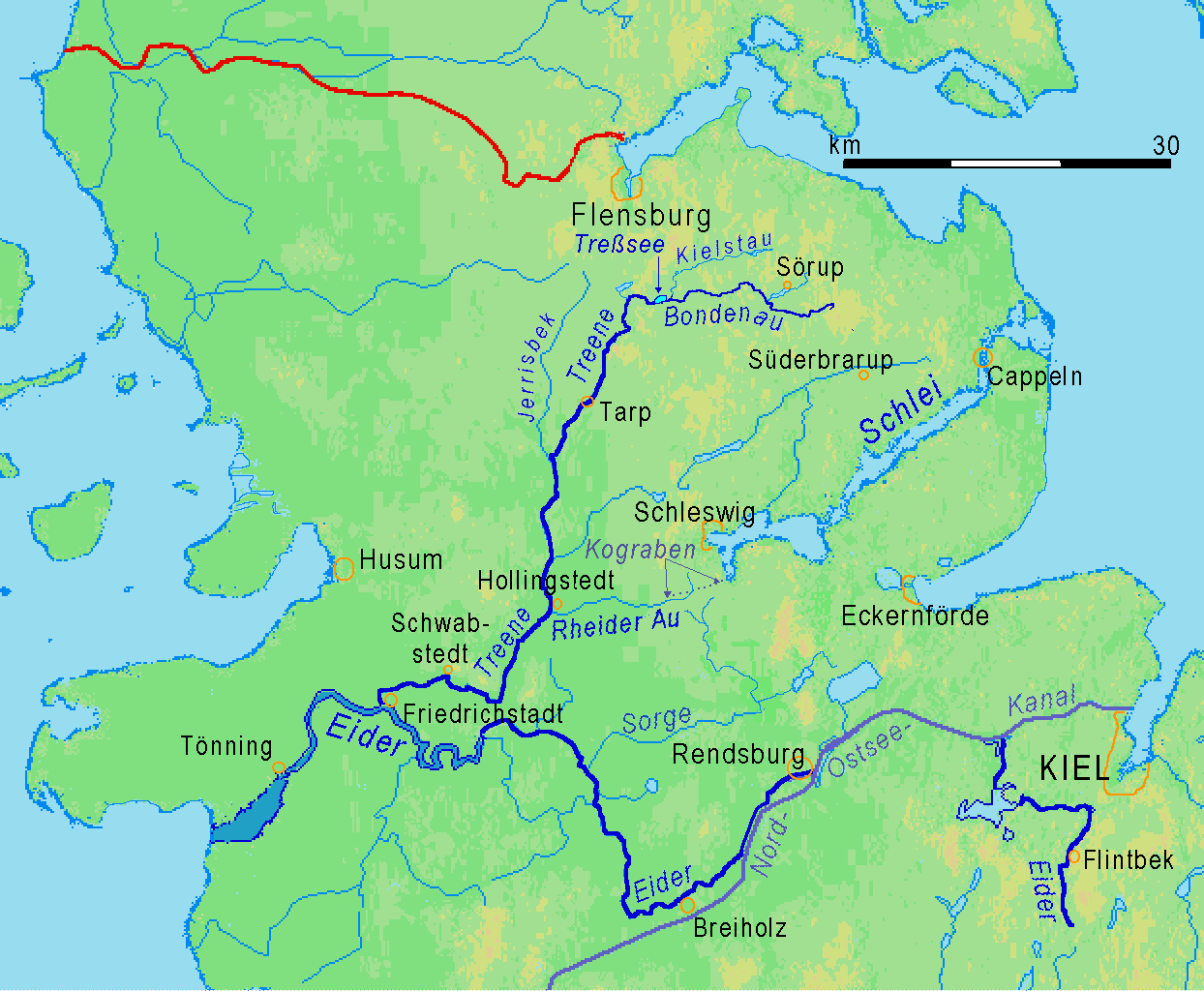

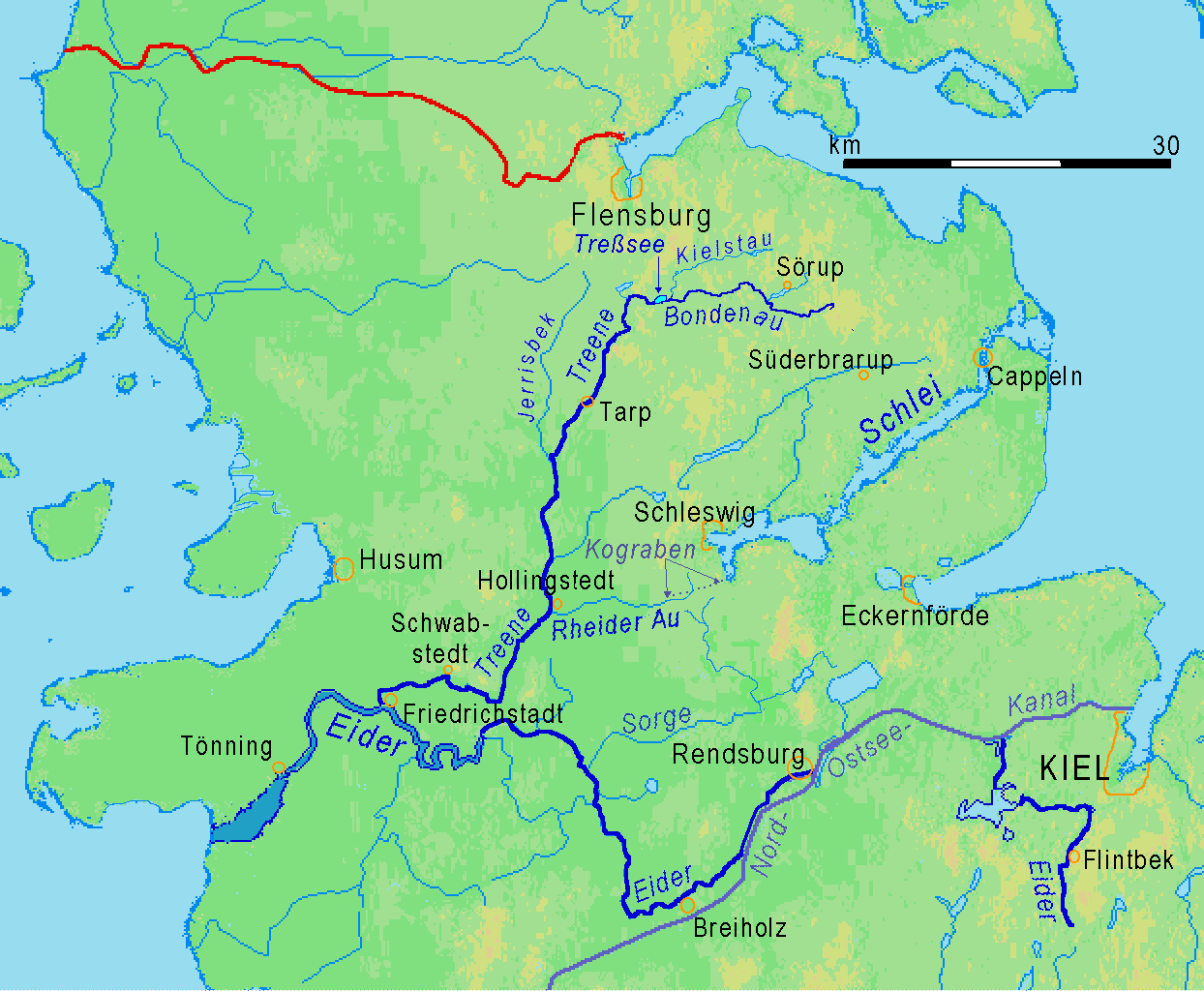
- Map of the rivers Eider and Treene, Rheider Au and Schlei.

Location
- Country: Germany
- State: Schleswig-Holstein

Physical characteristics
- Mouth
  - location: Treene
  - coordinates: 54.4467°N 9.3263°E

Basin features
- Progression: Treene→ Eider→ North Sea

The Rheider Au (Danish: Rejde Å or Spangebæk) is a river of Schleswig-Holstein, Germany.

The Rheider Au is a tributary of the Treene near Hollingstedt. Its source is on the Geest near Schleswig. In the Viking Age the route Eider - Treene - Rheider Au - Schlei served as a navigation way and/or transport or trade route between places to the north and the Baltic Sea, as commercial centres functioned (see Dorestad, Haithabu).

== See also ==
- List of rivers of Schleswig-Holstein
