= Borgwedel =

Borgwedel Borgvedel
- Municipality
- Coat of arms

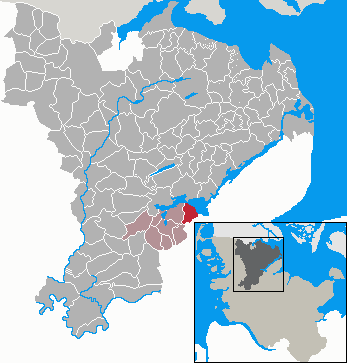
- Location of Borgwedel; Borgvedel within Schleswig-Flensburg district
- Interactive map of Borgwedel; Borgvedel
- Location within Germany Location within Schleswig-Holstein
- Coordinates: 54°30′N 9°40′E
- Country: Germany
- State: Schleswig-Holstein
- District: Schleswig-Flensburg
- Municipal assoc.: Haddeby

Government
  - Mayor: Uwe Jensen (SPD)

Area
  - Total: 9.96 km^{2} (3.85 sq mi)
- Elevation: 4 m (13 ft)

Population (2025-12-31)
  - Total: 712
  - Density: 71.5/km^{2} (185/sq mi)
- Time zone: UTC+01:00 (CET)
  - Summer (DST): UTC+02:00 (CEST)
- Postal codes: 24857
- Dialling codes: 04621, 04354
- Vehicle registration: SL
- Website: www.borgwedel.de

Borgwedel (Danish: Borgvedel) is a municipality in the district of Schleswig-Flensburg, in Schleswig-Holstein, Germany.

== Geography ==
The municipality of Borgvedel consists of the villages of Borgvedel and Stegsvig (Stexwig) with Borgvedelmark and Stegsvigmark as well as individual places such as the farm Østerled etc. Østerlede( Osterlieth). There are several summer houses down by Slien.

== History ==
The place name Borgvedel (Bordel) is first mentioned in 1388 as Borchwich . In 1575 / 76, the name is documented on a bill from the court chapter in Schleswig . The place name describes a ford belonging to the castle (Old Norse veðill or vaðill). According to another explanation, the suffix was originally called -vig (≈bugt), which later became -vedel . The meaning would then be the bay of the castle.

The place name Stegsvig was first mentioned in 1412 . The first part is derived from stege for pole, post, pole, last part -vig denotes a bay. Fortifications from the Viking Age have been found in Stegsvig . Opposite the town of Stegsvig is the corresponding promontory Palør (Palørde), which was previously fortified with piling (palisades).

The farm Østerled or Østerlede was formed in 1821 from 2 united farms and later increased with a whole farm from Stegsvig.

== Politics ==
=== Municipal Council ===
A total of nine seats were awarded in the local elections on May 14, 2023. Of these, the Active Borgwieler Wählergemeinschaft received five seats and the SPD and CDU each received two seats.

== Economy ==
Borgwedel is a residential community with a strong focus on the district town of Schleswig . In the 1970s, several weekend home areas were built for people from Hamburg. Agriculture has lost a lot of its importance in recent decades. The nearest shops are in Fahrdorf, four kilometers away . The primary school for Borgwedel children is also located there. Employers in the community are the youth hostel on the Schlei and two retirement homes .
