= Busdorf =

Busdorf Bustrup
- Municipality
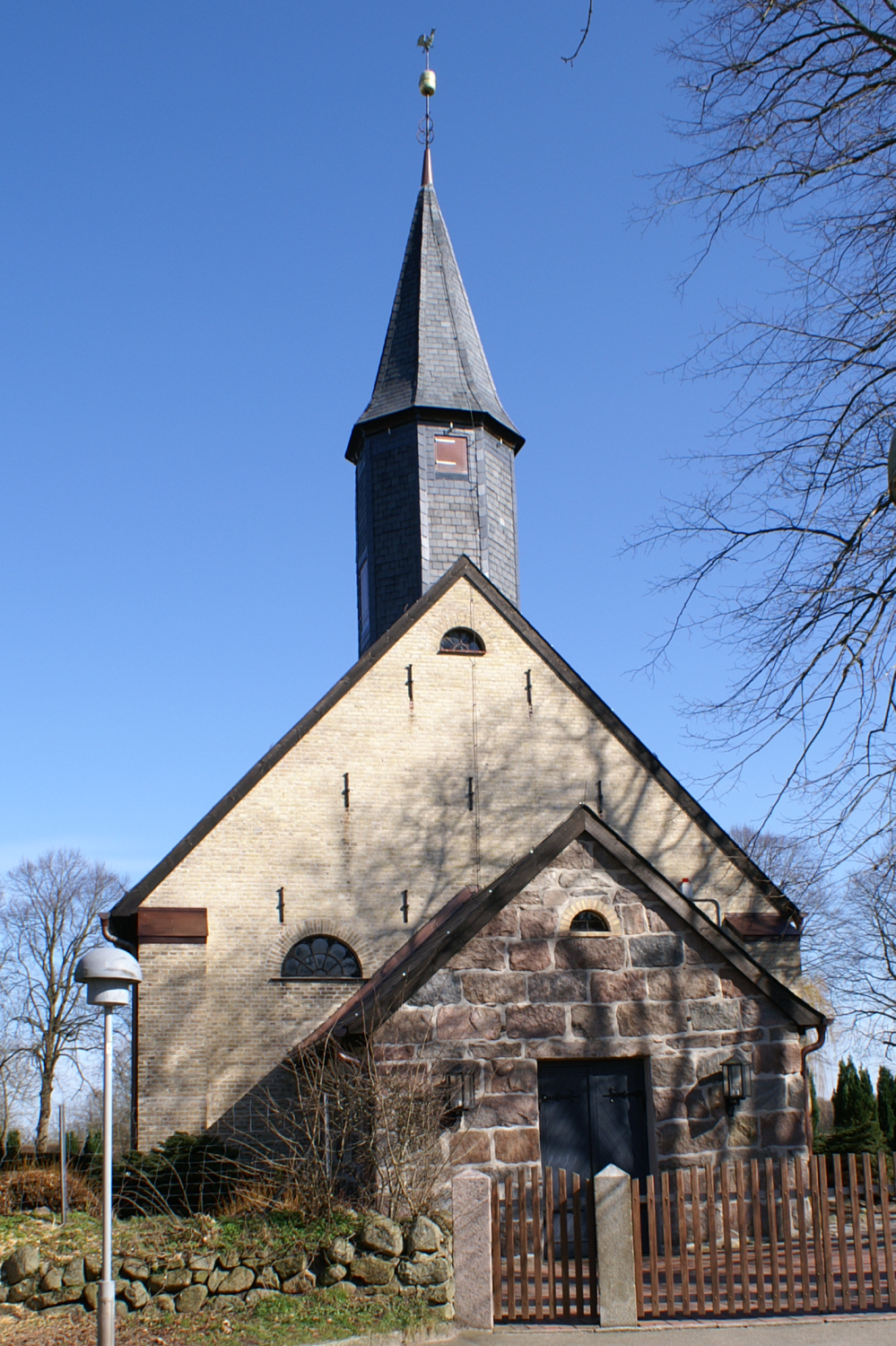
- Saint Ansgar Church

- Coat of arms

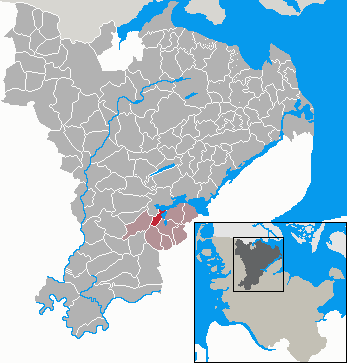
- Location of Busdorf; Bustrup within Schleswig-Flensburg district
- Interactive map of Busdorf; Bustrup
- Location within Germany Location within Schleswig-Holstein
- Coordinates: 54°30′N 9°33′E
- Country: Germany
- State: Schleswig-Holstein
- District: Schleswig-Flensburg
- Municipal assoc.: Haddeby

Government
  - Mayor: Ralf Feddersen (CDU)

Area
  - Total: 5.35 km^{2} (2.07 sq mi)
- Elevation: 18 m (59 ft)

Population (2025-12-31)
  - Total: 1,984
  - Density: 371/km^{2} (960/sq mi)
- Time zone: UTC+01:00 (CET)
  - Summer (DST): UTC+02:00 (CEST)
- Postal codes: 24866
- Dialling codes: 04621
- Vehicle registration: SL
- Website: www.haddeby.de

Busdorf (Danish: Bustrup) is a municipality in the district of Schleswig-Flensburg, in Schleswig-Holstein, Germany. The municipality cooperates with neighboring municipalities in the Haddeby municipal community (Amt Haddeby).

== Geography ==
Located between Bustrupdam in the west, the Schleswig River in the north and Haddeby Nor (Hedeby Nor) in the east. It borders in the northwest immediately on the Schleswig district of Frederiksberg (Kratbjerg), in the east on Farup (Fartorp). The border with Schleswig was marked through the Odderkulen until 1957/1961.

== History ==
There is archaeological evidence of Neolithic and Bronze Age settlement in the local area. The remains of the settlement of Viking Age Haithabu and the Skarthi Stone, a runestone probably erected at the beginning of the 11th century, are also located in today's municipal area.

The place name first appears in written sources in 1299. The place name is derived from the male name Bure or perhaps from a town (here the nearby Hedeby).

The municipality's main attractions are the Viking town of Hedeby, the border rampart Dannevirke and the Skardesten, found in 1857. The runestone is now displayed at the Viking Museum Hedeby. Also near the village are the Danhøjene (also Tvebjerge) burial mounds. Bustrup's city coat of arms shows the stone, together with the two South Jutland lions, on a blue background.

The town's church is located a little outside the town at Haddeby Nor, was built around 1200 in the Romanesque style and is dedicated to the Apostle Andrew. The church is said to have been built on the foundations of the first Danish church, Ansgar founded in 876 in Hedeby.

The Battle of Schleswig in 1848 took place near Bustrup.

After the Second World War and the end of the Nazi era, there was a significant influx of refugees to Schleswig-Holstein, which almost doubled the resident population. New residential areas were built.

Small and medium-sized trade, craft and service companies replaced agricultural businesses and settled like the Wikingerland business park to the south, which was opened in 1998. There, partygoers from many parts of the country organize dance nights in the large-scale discotheque Vineta, directly ff Federal Highway A7.

== Politics ==
=== Municipal Council ===
A total of 15 seats were awarded in the local elections on May 14, 2023. Of these, the CDU received six seats, the Busdorf Voters' Association four seats, the SPD three seats and the SSW two seats.

=== Coat of arms ===
Blazon : “In blue under two golden lions one behind the other the golden Busdorf runestone.”

Heraldically correct blazon: "Under a blue shield head, therein (bar by bar) two striding golden lions, in blue a rectangular, upright laid, golden stone with five linear rune columns, the right one narrower."

Explanation of the coat of arms:

The lions are the Schleswig Lions, the stone is the Busdorf Runestone.

== Notable people ==
- Anke Spoorendonk (born 1947 in Bustrup), Danish-South Lesvigian politician
- Dr. Ute Drews, The director of the Viking Museum Haithabu, was made an honorary citizen of the municipality of Busdorf in 2022.

== Notable Monuments ==
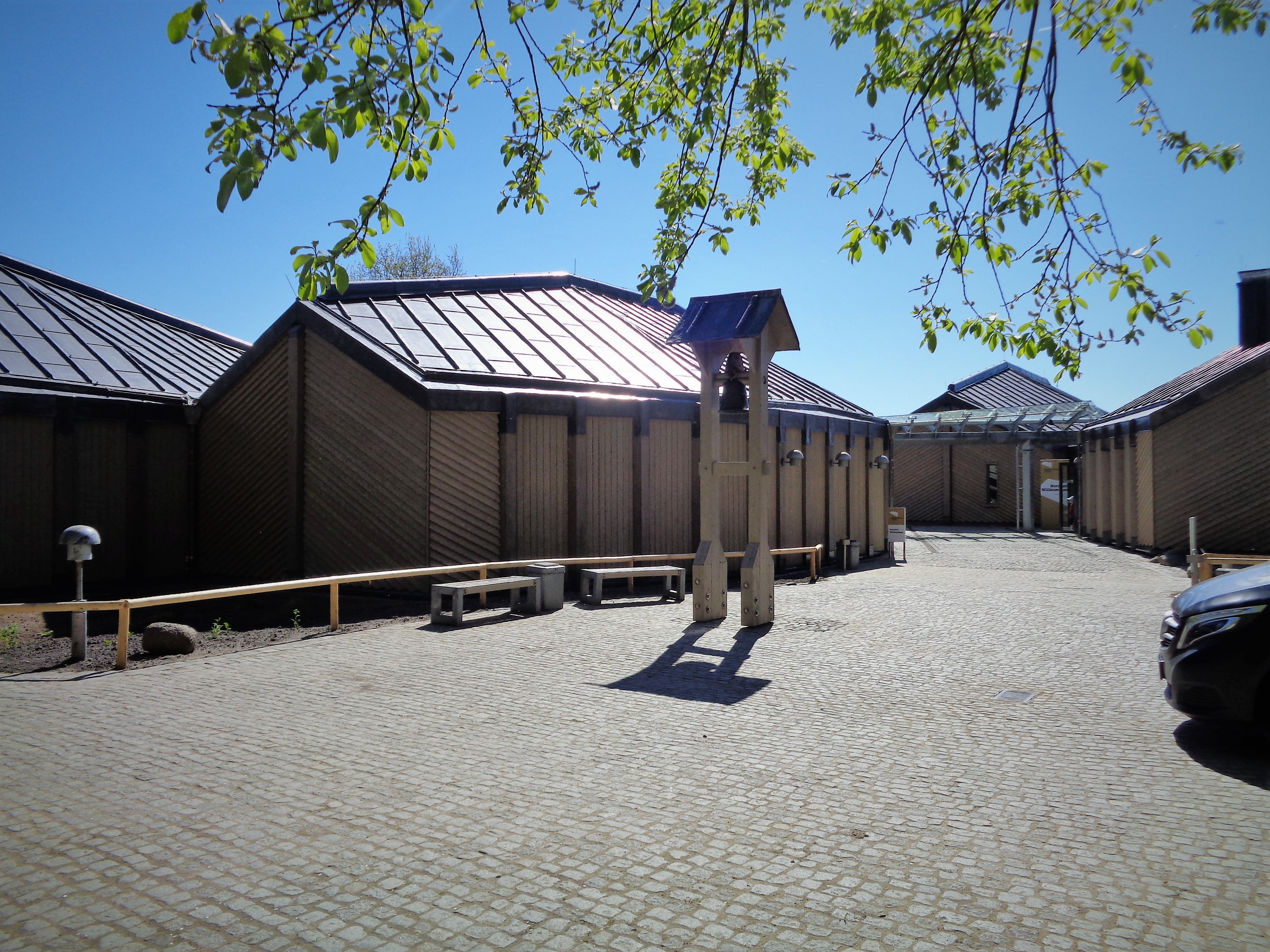
Haithabu Museum

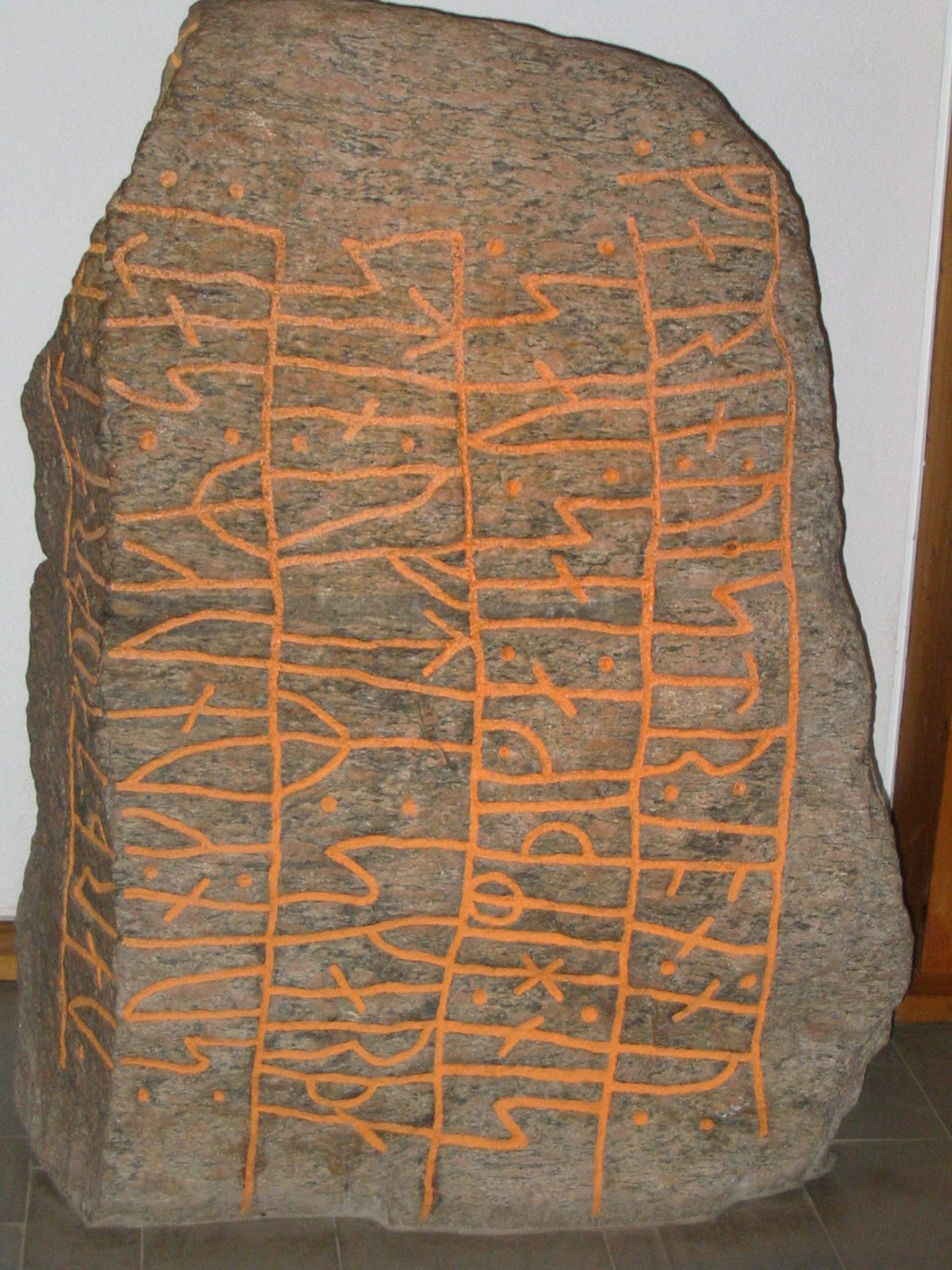
Skarthi stone front

=== Haithabu and Danewerk ===
From the 9th to the 11th century, Haithabu was located within a ring wall on Haddebyer Noor. During the Viking Age, the settlement was one of the most important economic, political and social centres in Northern Europe. After the settlement was destroyed in 1066, the inhabitants founded the town of Schleswig. A large part of the Danewerk, an old barrier wall across the Cimbrian Peninsula, comparable to the Limes or Hadrian's Wall, is also located in the municipal area.

=== Skarthi Stone ===
The Skarthi Stone, a runestone, was discovered in 1857 between two burial mounds in the municipality. It is said to commemorate a follower of King Sven Forkbeard. The inscription on the Skarthi Stone, also known as the "Runestone of Busdorf" or "Danewerk Stone", which was translated by Wolfgang Laur (1987), could refer to the shepherd of this Danish king who fell at Haithabu - Skarthi - who was apparently previously a Jomsviking in the Jomsburg in Pomerania.

=== St. Andreas Haddeby (Busdorf) ===
St. Andrew's Church is located outside the village centre. The single-nave Romanesque fieldstone church was built around 1200. It is said to be located on the foundations of the church that Ansgar had built in 849 when he wanted to evangelise the Vikings. However, the church is located outside the historic ring wall on one of the most important trade routes in the region.

== Literature ==
- Dirk Jennert: “Viking country”. In: Stephan Richter (ed.): Schleswig-Holstein Topography. Vol. 2: Boren - Ellerau. Flying-Kiwi-Verl. Junge, Flensburg 2002, ISBN 3-926055-68-5, p. 190–193.
