= Dannewerk =

Dannewerk Dannevirke
- Municipality
- Coat of arms

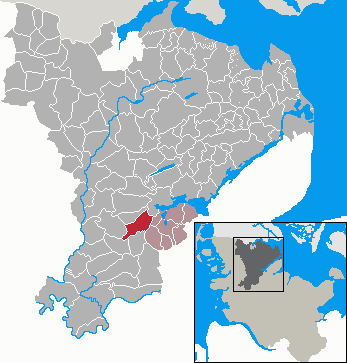
- Location of Dannewerk; Dannevirke within Schleswig-Flensburg district
- Interactive map of Dannewerk; Dannevirke
- Location within Germany Location within Schleswig-Holstein
- Coordinates: 54°28′N 9°30′E
- Country: Germany
- State: Schleswig-Holstein
- District: Schleswig-Flensburg
- Municipal assoc.: Haddeby

Government
  - Mayor: Hermann Büll

Area
  - Total: 16.65 km^{2} (6.43 sq mi)
- Elevation: 20 m (66 ft)

Population (2025-12-31)
  - Total: 1,117
  - Density: 67.09/km^{2} (173.8/sq mi)
- Time zone: UTC+01:00 (CET)
  - Summer (DST): UTC+02:00 (CEST)
- Postal codes: 24867
- Dialling codes: 04621
- Vehicle registration: SL
- Website: www.haddeby.de

Dannewerk (Danish: Dannevirke) is a municipality in Amt Haddeby in Schleswig-Flensburg District, Germany. It is named after the historic Danish Danevirke fortification.
