= Hedeby =

Danish Viking Age trading settlement

UNESCO World Heritage Site
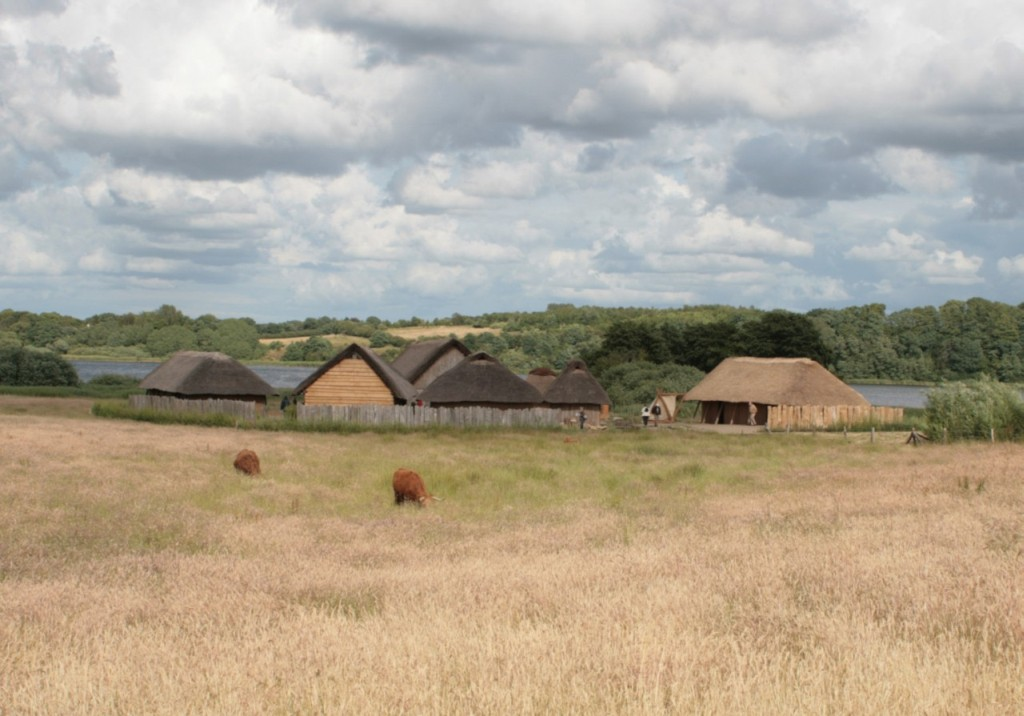
- Reconstructed houses in the area of the old settlement

- Location within Germany Location within Schleswig-Holstein
- Location: Busdorf, Schleswig-Holstein, Germany
- Part of: Archaeological Border Complex of Hedeby and the Danevirke
- Criteria: Cultural: (iii), (iv)
- Reference: 1553
- Inscription: 2018 (42nd Session)
- Coordinates: 54°29′28″N 9°33′55″E

Hedeby (Danish pronunciation: [ˈhe̝ːðəˌpyˀ], Old Norse: Heiðabýr, German: Haithabu) was an important Danish Viking Age (8th to the 11th centuries) trading settlement near the southern end of the Jutland Peninsula, now in the Schleswig-Flensburg district of Schleswig-Holstein, Germany. Around 965, chronicler Ibrahim ibn Yaqub visited Hedeby and described it as "a very large city at the very end of the world's ocean."

Due to its unique position between the Frankish Empire and the Danish Kingdom, the settlement developed as a trading centre at the head of a narrow, navigable inlet known as the Schlei, which connects to the Baltic Sea. The location was favorable because there is a short portage of less than 15 km to the Treene River, which flows into the Eider with its North Sea estuary, making it a convenient place where goods and ships could be pulled on a corduroy road overland for an almost uninterrupted seaway between the Baltic and the North Sea and avoid a dangerous and time-consuming circumnavigation of Jutland, providing Hedeby with a role similar to later Lübeck. Just a few kilometers south of Hedeby flows the Eider River, which marked Denmark's southern border from 811 to 1864. Hedeby was the second largest Nordic town during the Viking Age, after Uppåkra in present-day southern Sweden. The city of Schleswig was later founded on the other side of the Schlei. Hedeby was abandoned after its destruction in 1066.

The site was rediscovered in the late 19th century and excavations began in 1900. The Hedeby Viking Museum was opened next to the site in 1985. Because of its historical importance during the Viking Age and exceptional preservation, Hedeby and the nearby defensive earthworks of the Danevirke were inscribed on the UNESCO World Heritage List in 2018.

Hedeby is mentioned in Hans Christian Andersen's fairy tale The Marsh King's Daughter.

== Name ==
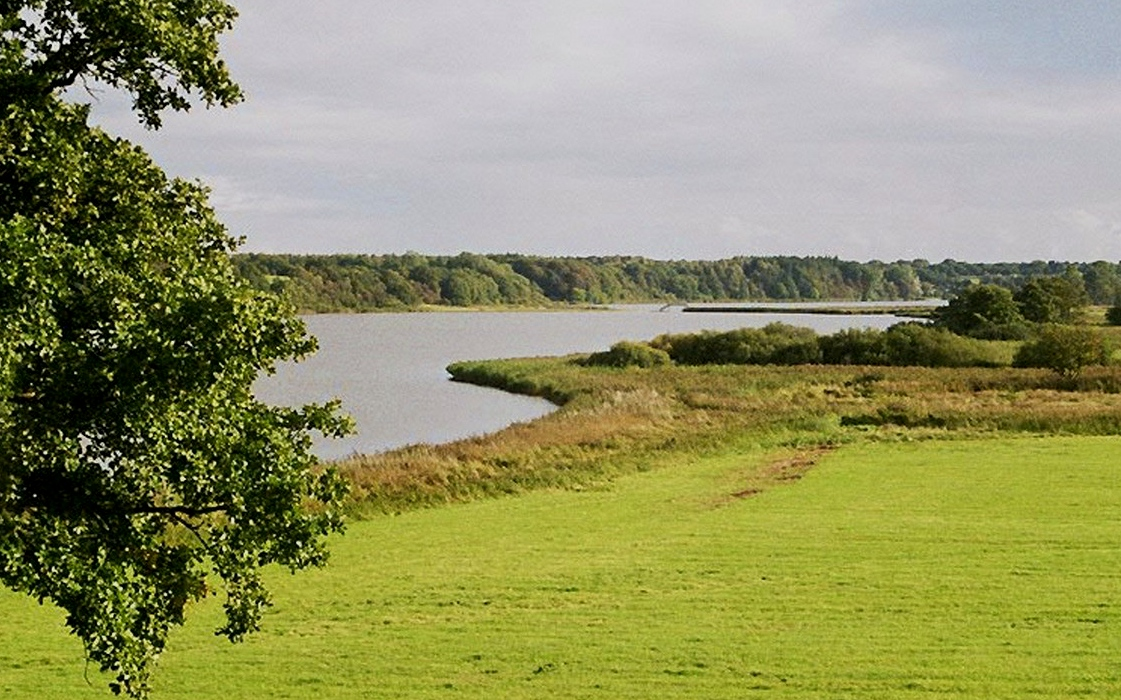
Site of the former town of Hedeby

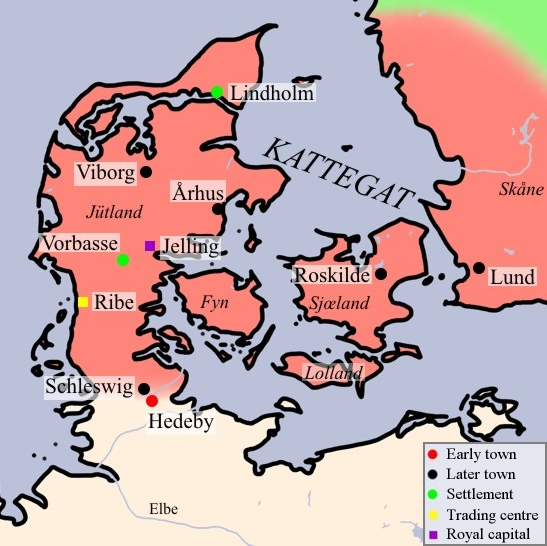
Map of Viking Denmark with Hedeby at the southern edge

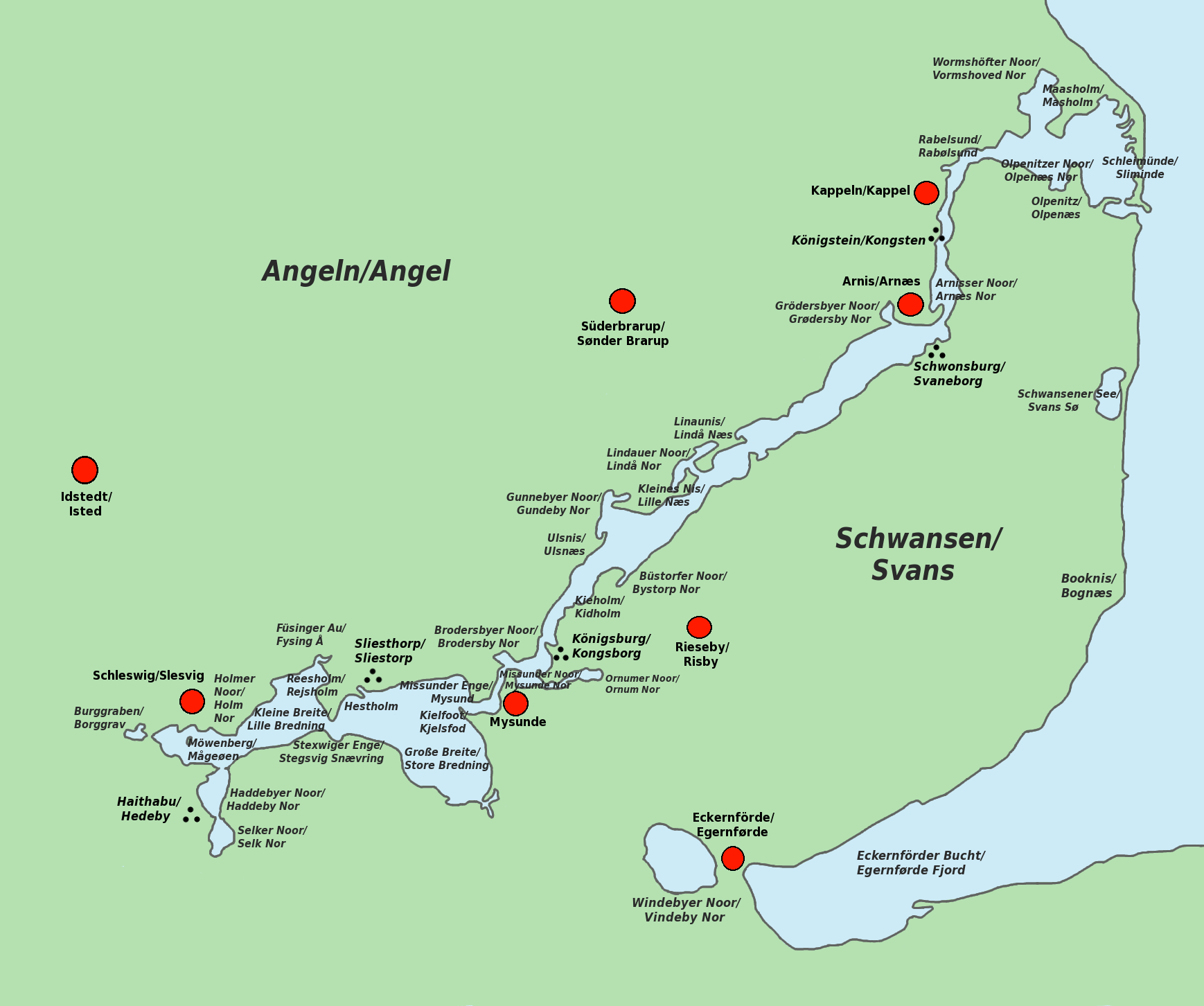
Bilingual map of the Schlei (German and Danish placenames)

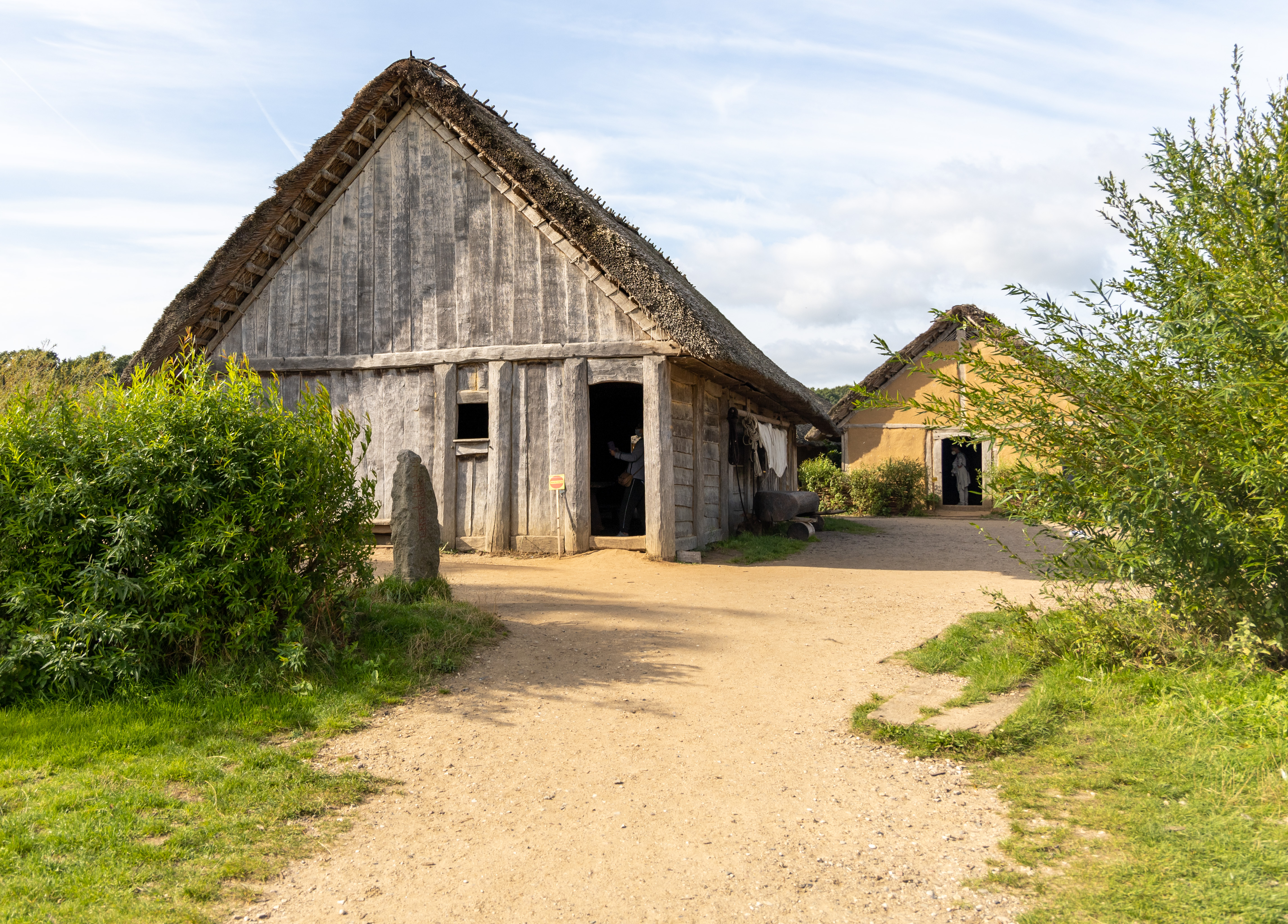
Two reconstructed houses at Hedeby

The Old Norse name Heiða-býr simply translates to "heath-settlement" (heiðr "heath" and býr = "yard; settlement, village, town"). The name is recorded in numerous spelling variants.

- Heiðabýr is the reconstructed name in standard Old Norse, also anglicized as Heithabyr.
- The Stone of Eric, a 10th-century Danish runestone with an inscription mentioning ᚼᛅᛁᚦᛅ᛭ᛒᚢ (haiþa bu), found in 1796.
- Old English æt Hæðum, from Ohtere's and Wulfstan's accounts of their travels to Alfred the Great in the Old English Orosius.
- Hedeby, the modern Danish spelling, also most commonly used in English.
- Haddeby is the Low German form, also the name of the administrative district formed in 1949 and named for the site; in 1985, the district introduced a coat of arms featuring a bell with a runic inscription reading ᚼᛁᚦᛅ᛬ᛒᚢ (hiþa:bu).
- Haithabu is the modern German spelling used when referring to the historical settlement; this spelling represents the transliteration of the name as found in the Stone of Eric inscription; it was introduced among other variants in antiquarian literature in the 19th century and has since become the standard German name of the settlement.

Sources from the 9th and 10th century AD also attest to the names Sliesthorp and Sliaswich (cf. -thorp vs. -wich), and the town of Schleswig still exists 3 km north of Hedeby. However, Æthelweard claimed in his Latin translation of the Anglo-Saxon Chronicle that the Saxons used Slesuuic and the Danes Haithaby to refer to the same town.

== History ==
=== Origins ===
Hedeby is first mentioned in the Frankish chronicles of Einhard (804), who was in the service of Charlemagne, as a place Charlemagne stayed in the summer of 804, at the end of the Saxon Wars. In 808 the Danish king Godfred (Lat. Godofredus) destroyed a competing Slav trade centre named Reric, and it is recorded in the Frankish chronicles that he resettled the merchants from there to Hedeby. This may have provided the initial impetus for the town to further develop.

The same sources record that Godfred strengthened the Danevirke, an earthen wall that stretched across the south of the Jutland peninsula. The Danevirke joined the defensive walls of Hedeby to form an east–west barrier across the peninsula, from the marshes in the west to the Schlei inlet leading into the Baltic in the east.

The town itself was surrounded on its three landward sides (north, west, and south) by earthworks. At the end of the 9th century the northern and southern parts of the town were abandoned for the central section. Later a 9-metre (29-ft) high semi-circular wall was erected to guard the western approaches to the town. On the eastern side, the town was bordered by the innermost part of the Schlei inlet and the bay of Haddebyer Noor.

=== Timeline ===
based on Elsner
| 793 | Viking raid on Lindisfarne – traditional date for the beginning of the Viking Age. |
| 804 | First mention of Hedeby |
| 808 | Destruction of Reric and migration of tradespeople to Hedeby |
| c. 850 | Construction of a church at Hedeby |
| 886 | The Danelaw is established in England, following Viking invasion |
| 911 | The Vikings settle in Normandy |
| 948 | Hedeby becomes a bishopric |
| 965 | Visit of Al-Tartushi to Hedeby |
| 974 | Hedeby falls to the Holy Roman Empire |
| 983 | Hedeby returns to Danish control |
| c. 1000 | The Viking Leif Erikson explores Vinland, probably in Newfoundland |
| 1016–1042 | Danish kings rule in England |
| 1050 | The Norwegian King Harald Hardrada destroys Hedeby |
| 1066 | Final destruction of Hedeby by a Slavic army. |
| 1066 | Traditional end of the Viking Age |

=== Rise ===
Hedeby became a principal marketplace because of its geographical location on the major trade routes between the Frankish Empire and Scandinavia (north-south), and between the Baltic and the North Sea (east-west). Between 800 and 1000 the growing economic power of the Vikings led to its dramatic expansion as a major trading centre. Along with Birka and Schleswig, Hedeby's prominence as a major international trading hub served as a foundation of the Hanseatic League that would emerge by the 12th century.

Hedeby played an important role in the international Viking slave trade between Europe and the Byzantines as well as the Islamic world. People taken captive during the Viking raids across Eastern Europe could be sold to Moorish Spain via the Dublin slave trade or transported to Hedeby or Brännö in Scandinavia and from there via the Volga trade route to Russia, where Slavic slaves and furs were sold to Muslim merchants in exchange for Arab silver dirham and silk, which have been found in Birka, Wollin and Dublin; initially this trade route between Europe and the Abbasid Caliphate passed via the Khazar Kaghanate, but from the early 10th-century onward it went via Volga Bulgaria and from there by caravan to Khwarazm, to the Samanid slave market in Central Asia and finally via Iran to the Abbasid Caliphate.

The following indicates the importance achieved by the town:

- The town was described by visitors from England (Wulfstan – 9th century) and the Mediterranean (Al-Tartushi – 10th century).
- Hedeby became the seat of a bishop (948) and belonged to the Archbishopric of Hamburg and Bremen.
- The town minted its own coins (from 825).
- Adam of Bremen (11th century) reports that ships were sent from this portus maritimus to Slavic lands, to Sweden, Samland (Semlant) and even Greece.

A Swedish dynasty founded by Olof the Brash is said to have ruled Hedeby during the last decades of the 9th century and the first part of the 10th century. This was told to Adam of Bremen by the Danish king Sweyn Estridsson, and it is supported by three runestones found in Denmark. Two of them were raised by the mother of Olof's grandson Sigtrygg Gnupasson. The third runestone, discovered in 1796, is from Hedeby, the Stone of Eric (Swedish: Erikstenen). It is inscribed with Norwegian-Swedish runes. It is, however, possible that Danes also occasionally wrote with this version of the younger futhark.

=== Lifestyle ===
Life was short and crowded in Hedeby. The small houses were clustered tightly together in a grid, with the east–west streets leading down to jetties in the harbour.

While Hedeby primarily served as a trade emporium, archaeological evidence demonstrates that it had produced many goods locally. Discovery and analysis of excavated artifacts reveal that tools such as spindle whorls, spindle rods, loom weights, and bone needles were standardized products. The distribution of these various tools demonstrates that there was a wide range of textiles produced at Hedeby, ranging from coarse fabric for sailcloth and outer-garments, to fine worsted wool fabric for higher quality clothes. More than 340,000 pieces related to comb making, tools for working leather, remains of ironworking and goldsmithing, and mercury from fire gilding were also found. There was also evidence found for the presence of a glass furnace active in the site from the period of 850 to 900. A total of 7,700 decorative beads have been unearthed in Hedeby, although it is likely that a small percentage of those were produced in situ. The presence of these artifacts at the site indicate that Hedeby had a robust local economy that produced a wide variety of goods, likely for domestic use and for trade at the sites markets.

Analysis of some of Hedeby's burial sites provide evidence for the existence of an aristocracy. Graves that are lavishly furnished with jewelry, commodities, weapons and armor set apart from more humble inhumation sites indicate an established degree of stratification among Hedeby's society.

The trade and production of beads was tied to a robust fashion within Hedeby. Beads made of varying materials such as carnelian, rock crystal, amber, jet, silver, brass, bronze, and mosaic glass have been found in the harbor excavation sites, burials, and throughout the settlement. Dating of these finds reveals that there was a change in style roughly every 10–35 years within the settlement.

Al-Tartushi, a late 10th-century traveller from al-Andalus, provides one of the most colourful and often quoted descriptions of life in Hedeby. Al-Tartushi was from Cordoba in Spain, which had a significantly more wealthy and comfortable lifestyle than Hedeby. While Hedeby may have been significant by Scandinavian standards, Al-Tartushi was unimpressed:

"Slesvig (Hedeby) is a very large town at the extreme end of the world ocean... The inhabitants worship Sirius, except for a minority of Christians who have a church of their own there.... He who slaughters a sacrificial animal puts up poles at the door to his courtyard and impales the animal on them, be it a piece of cattle, a ram, billy goat or a pig so that his neighbours will be aware that he is making a sacrifice in honour of his god. The town is poor in goods and riches. People eat mainly fish which exist in abundance. Babies are thrown into the sea for reasons of economy. The right to divorce belongs to the women.... Artificial eye make-up is another peculiarity; when they wear it their beauty never disappears, indeed it is enhanced in both men and women. Further: Never did I hear singing fouler than that of these people, it is a rumbling emanating from their throats, similar to that of a dog but even more bestial."

=== Destruction ===
The town was sacked in 1050 by King Harald Hardrada of Norway during a conflict with King Sweyn II of Denmark. He set the town on fire by sending several burning ships into the harbour, the charred remains of which were found at the bottom of the Schlei during recent excavations. An unnamed Norwegian skald in Harald's army, quoted by Snorri Sturluson, describes the sack as follows:

All Hedeby was burned from end to end out of anger, and that one can call a valiant deed, I believe.
There is hope that we will do harm to Sveinn; I was on the rampart of the stronghold last night before dawn; high flame burst from the houses.

In 1066 the town was sacked and burned by West Slavs. Following the destruction, Hedeby was slowly abandoned. People moved across the Schlei inlet, which separates the two peninsulas of Angeln and Schwansen, to the growing town of Schleswig. Hedeby's royal tolls and levies were transferred to the town by the monarchy.

== Archaeology ==
=== 20th-century archaeology ===
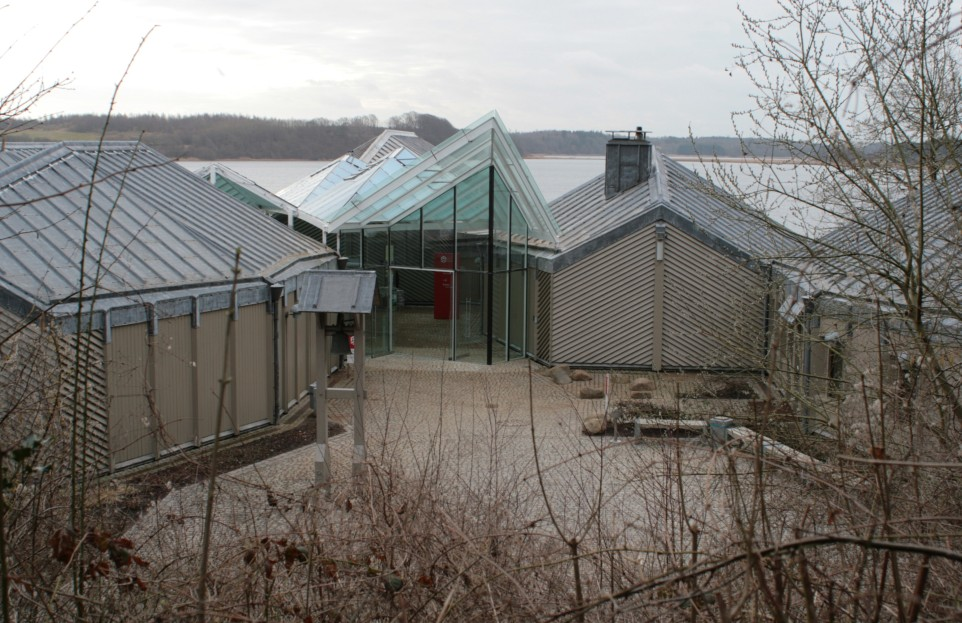
View of the Viking Museum

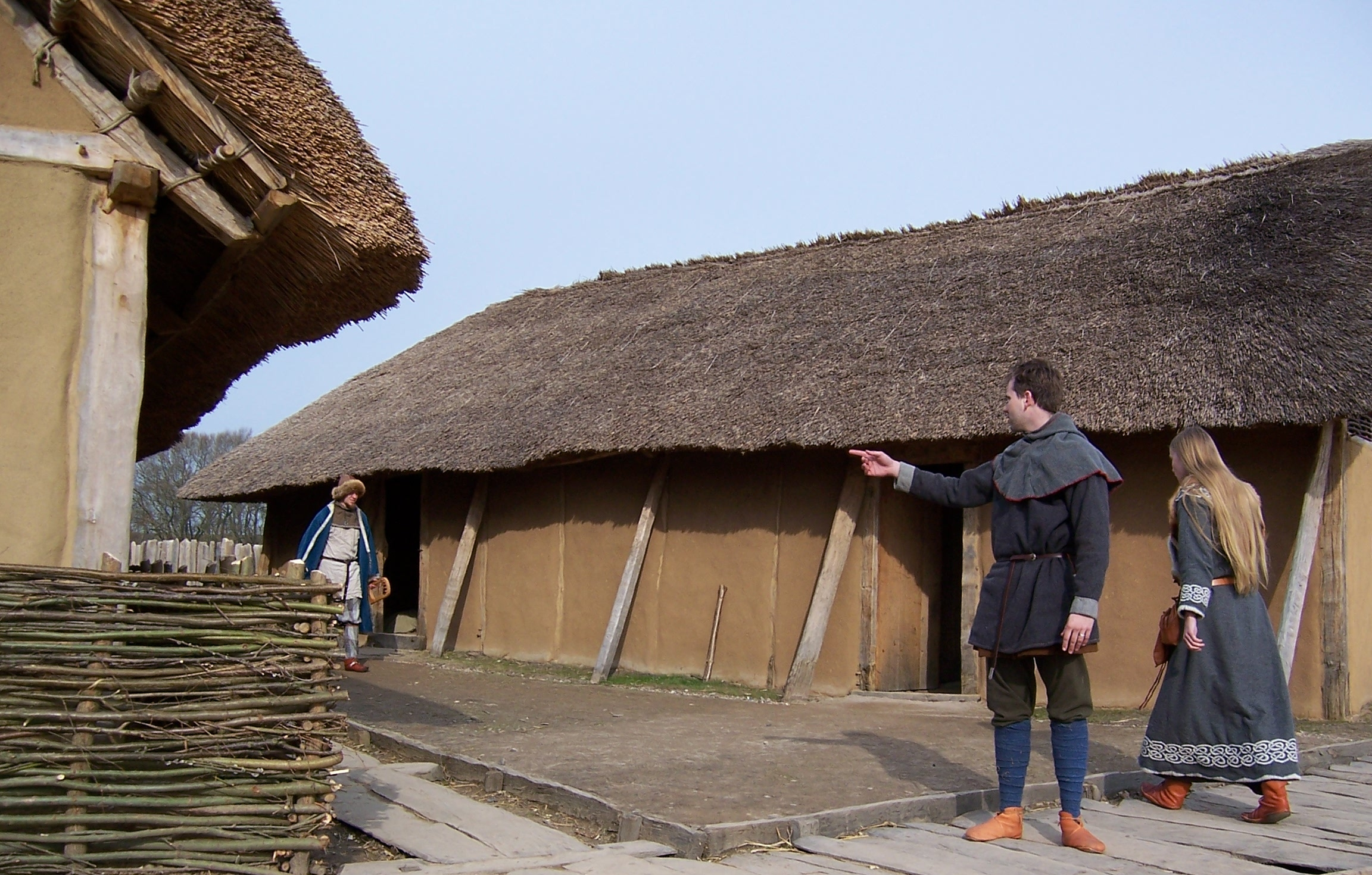
Reconstructed houses

After the settlement was abandoned, rising waters contributed to the complete disappearance of all visible structures on the site. It was even forgotten where the settlement had been. This proved to be fortunate for later archaeological work at the site.

The exact location of the site was rediscovered by Sophus Muller in 1897. Archaeological work began at the site in 1900 after the rediscovery of the settlement with small-scale excavations by Johanna Mestorf. Excavations were conducted for the next 15 years, and additionally in 1921. These early efforts would result in over 350 small trenches being dug, and the discovery of a burial site within the rampart dating from earlier in the site's history, they were led by Wilhelm Splieth and Friedrich Norr.

Further excavations were carried out between 1930 and 1939 by Nazi Germany's Ahnenerbe, the pseudoscientific organization within the SS under Herbert Jankuhn. The results of Jankuhn's discoveries were never published in detail. What has been published shows that this period saw the digging of several trial trenches, discovering a group of ten chamber burials, a cremation burial site, and two inhumation graves.

Excavation in 1956 found more inhumation and cremation burials south of the rampart, which prompted many large-scale excavations. Klaus Raddatz, Heiko Steuer, and Konrad Weidemann investigated much of the cemetery site at that time, but their findings have not been published in detail.

In 1963, Torsten Capelle and Kurt Schietzel conducted further work on the site, they were the source of the youngest find at the site, with an excavated well dated to 1020 A.D. by dendrochronology.

Archaeological work on the site was productive for two main reasons: that the site had never been built on since its destruction some 840 years earlier, and that the permanently waterlogged ground had preserved wood and other perishable materials. The embankments surrounding the settlement were excavated, and the harbour was partially dredged, during which the wrecks of multiple Viking ships were discovered, including the Hedeby 1. Despite all this work, only 5% of the settlement (and only 1% of the harbour) has as yet been investigated.

The most important finds resulting from the excavations are now on display in the adjoining Hedeby Viking Museum.

=== 21st-century archaeology ===
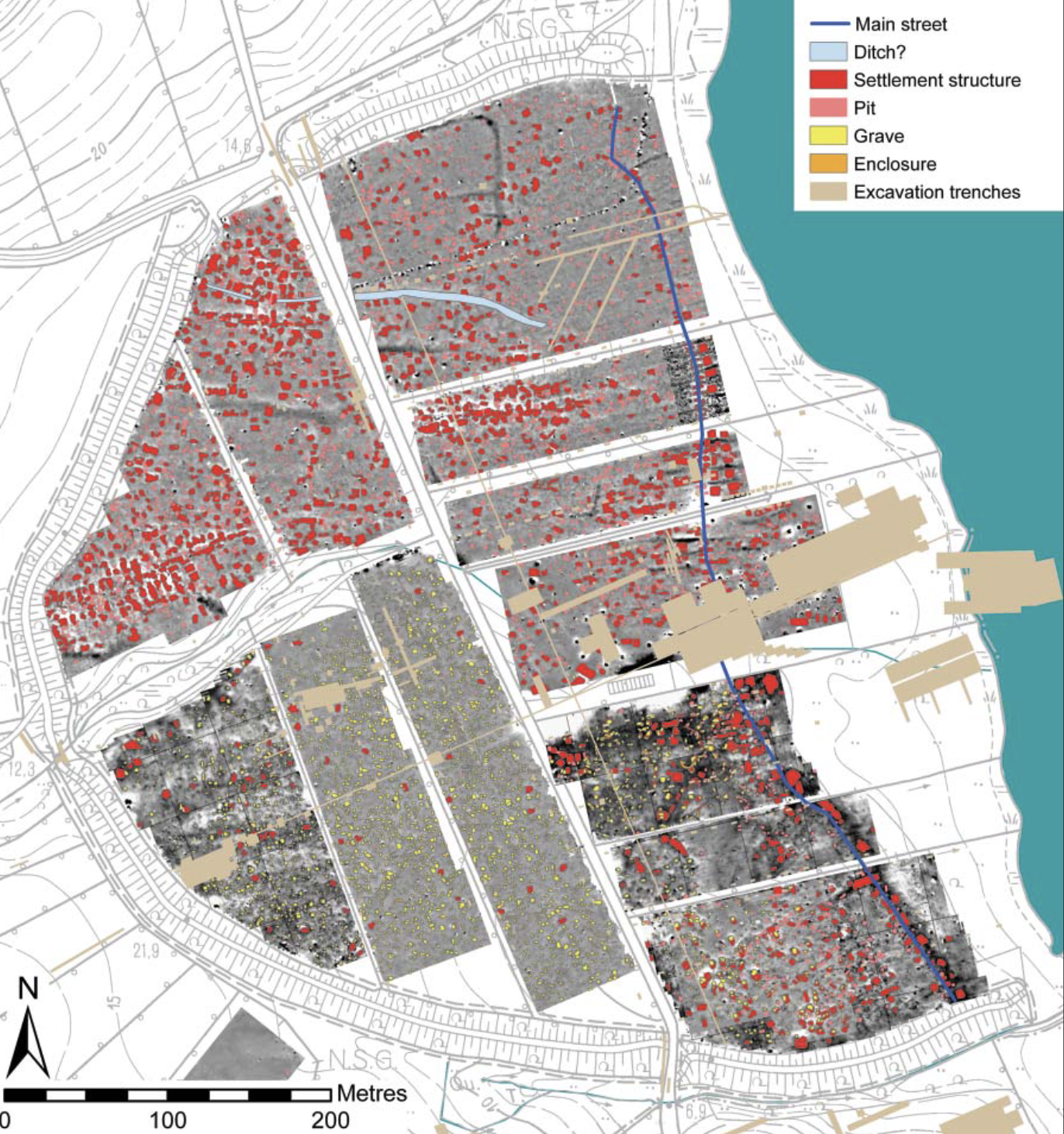
A contour map of Hedeby, overlaid on top of this is the magnetic map created by the archaeological teams at Vienna and Marburg. These images are interpreted by Volker Hilberg who color coded various features of interest.

Work has continued on the site since the earlier projects.

In 2002 a large scale geophysical project was started by teams from Marburg, Munich and Vienna. Over the course of three weeks, a total of ca 29 ha in and around the semi-circular rampart were analysed using Fluxgate, Caesium magnetometer and ground-penetrating radar.

Further work continued in 2003 when the Archäologisches Landesmuseum began a metal detector survey with the help of the Bornholmske Amatørarkaologer and a group from Schleswig-Holstein. Throughout their work, 11,500 metal finds were collected and catalogued with a D-GPS system.

In 2005 an ambitious archaeological reconstruction program was initiated on the original site. Based on the results of archaeological analyses, exact copies of some of the original Viking houses have been built.

== See also ==
- Hedeby stones
- Rurik
- Jelling
- Ribe

== Bibliography and media ==
- A number of short archaeological films relating to Hedeby and produced by researchers during the 1980s are available on DVD from the University of Kiel's Archaeological Film Project.
- Most publications on Hedeby are in German. See Wikipedia's German-language article on Hedeby.
- Crumlin-Pedersen, Ole (1997). Viking-Age Ships and Shipbuilding in Hedeby/ Haithabu and Schleswig. Ships and Boats of the North 2. Schleswig and Roskilde: Archaeologisches Landesmuseum der Christian-Albrechts-Universitat, Wikinger Museum Haithabu, The National Museum of Denmark, and The Viking Ship Museum in Roskilde.
