= Birka and Hovgården =

Archaeological complex in Sweden

UNESCO World Heritage Site
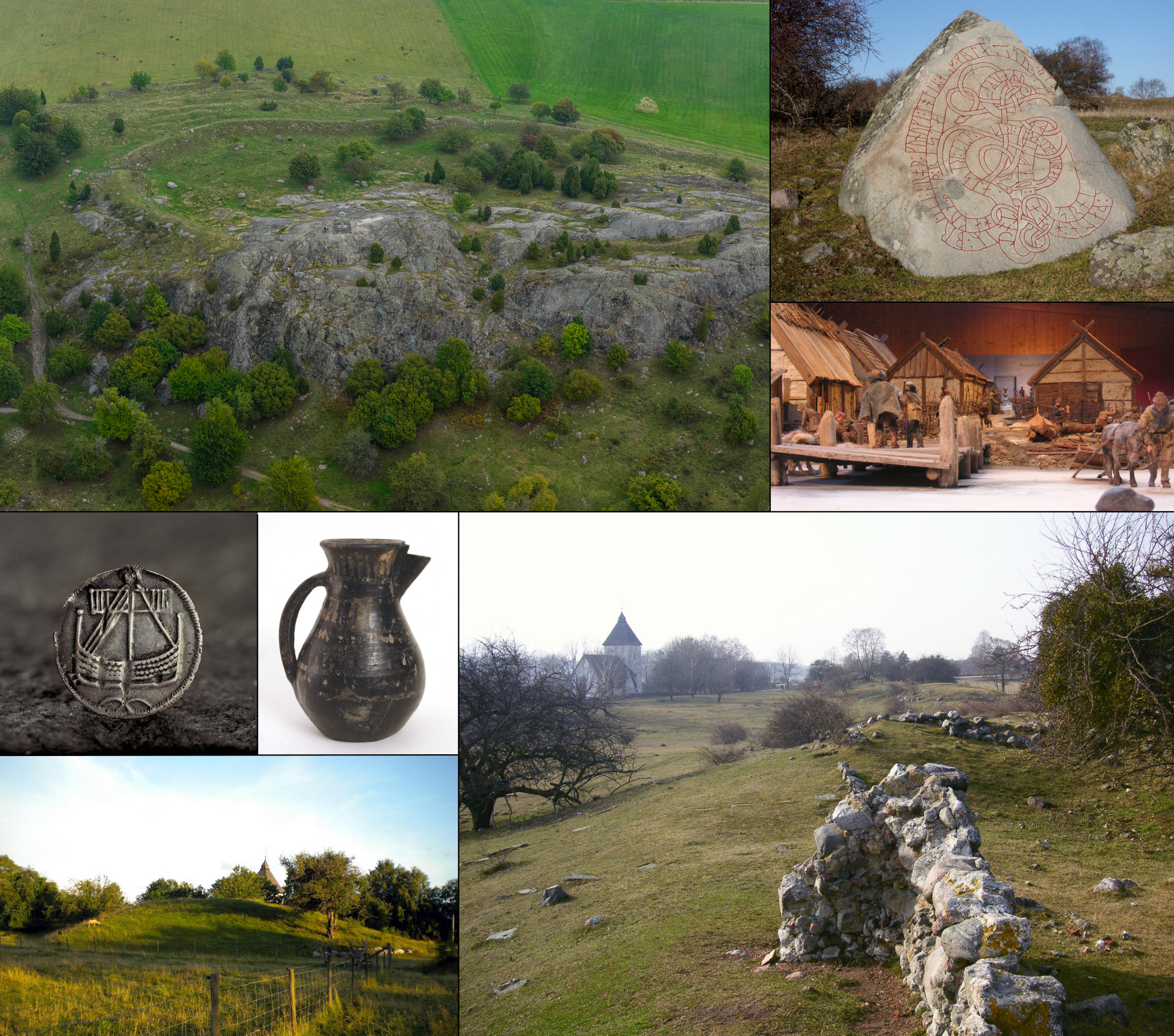

- Location within Sweden
- Criteria: (iii), (iv)
- Reference: 555
- Inscription: 1993 (17th session Session)
- Extensions: 226 ha
- Coordinates: 59°20′06.504″N 14°32′33.504″E

Birka and Hovgården are two sites in Sweden that together form an archaeological complex dating from the Viking Age, inscribed on the UNESCO World Heritage List. The sites are located on the islands of Björkö and Adelsö, respectively, in Lake Mälaren, approximately 30 kilometres west of Stockholm.

Birka was founded in the mid-8th century. At that time, Lake Mälar formed a bay of the Baltic Sea, with sea levels approximately five meters higher than today. Birka occupied a strategic position, sheltered by a network of islands and skerries and located at the intersection of several major maritime routes. It developed into a principal center of trade in Sweden, surpassing the older site of Helgö and expanding on a significantly larger scale, with an estimated peak population of 700 to 1,000 inhabitants. The settlement concentrated a wide range of craft activities that relied on raw materials sourced from Scandinavian regions, including amber, iron from Bergslagen, furs and down, antler, and ivory. Manufactured goods were distributed locally to surrounding farms and, more extensively, exported in exchange for luxury items such as pottery, silk and fine embroidery, and silver. Trade initially focused on Western Europe; however, from the late 9th century onward, with the eastward expansion of the Varangians and the development of the Volga trade route and Dnieper trade route, commercial networks increasingly shifted toward eastern regions, particularly the Muslim world.

Birka likely held a special status granted either by the king of Sweden or a local ruler. This status appears to have included its own council (Thing) led by a prefect and provided protection for all inhabitants, including foreigners. Due to its size and administrative role, Birka is sometimes regarded as the first city in Sweden and is frequently described as a proto-city. Located opposite Birka and established around the same period was the royal estate of Hovgården, which functioned as a residence for the king or one of the kings of Sweden and as the site of the council. Evidence suggests that Birka and Hovgården may have had at least partial tensions with the religious and political authorities of Gamla Uppsala. It is possible that the attack on Birka by Anund II of Uppsala in the 840s occurred within the context of these tensions.

Birka was a significant destination for Christian missionaries seeking to evangelize Sweden. The missions of Ansgar in 829 and again in 852 or 853 are documented in the Vita Anskarii, which constitutes the only contemporary source on Birka’s early history. While these missions resulted in the construction of a church and the conversion of several individuals, including the city’s prefect, they faced strong resistance from adherents of Norse religion, and some missionaries were killed.

Birka was abandoned around the year 970, with its role and population likely transferred to Sigtuna, which was founded around the same period. The reasons for Birka’s abandonment are not fully established, but it was probably influenced by multiple factors, including the silting of Lake Mälar, disruptions to eastern trade due to conflicts, and a battle that damaged part of the settlement. The nearby royal estate of Hovgården appears to have retained its status, and in the 1270s a palace was constructed there, serving as a summer residence for the king. This palace was destroyed at the end of the 14th century.

Both Birka and Hovgården were abandoned and remained largely forgotten for several centuries before being rediscovered through archaeological work, initially around 1680 and more extensively from 1871 onward with a series of major excavations. Birka is considered one of the most significant and well-preserved Viking Age sites, providing substantial information on Scandinavian society during the period. To ensure its preservation, the site was acquired by the Swedish state in the 20th century and was designated as a UNESCO World Heritage Site in 1993. Birka also functions as a public heritage site, attracting approximately 60,000 to 70,000 visitors annually. The site includes a museum, reconstructions of Viking Age buildings, and organizes thematic events during the tourist season.

== Toponymy ==
The name Birka represents the Swedish form of the Latin name Birca, which appears in contemporary sources such as the Vita Anskarii by Rimbert. The origin of the name is debated. One view is that it is a Latinization of Björkö, meaning “island (ö) of birches (björk).” From the Middle Ages onward, the term Birk was used to designate various Scandinavian locations, particularly trading towns with a special legal status under the laws of Bjarkey. It is therefore possible that the name of the trading town described by Rimbert derives from this concept. Some scholars propose the reverse possibility, suggesting that the name Birk or Bjarkey originated from Birka/Björkö, which may have been the first settlement to possess such a status, and that other trading towns later adopted similar laws, retaining the designation “laws of Bjarkey.” (Note: Peterson 2016, pp. 206–207)

The identification of Birka with the site of Björkö has been the subject of historical debate since the 18th century. Alternative locations have been proposed, including sites in Västergötland, Östergötland, and the Åland Islands. Contemporary analysis of written sources, together with extensive archaeological evidence, has established a scholarly consensus that the Birka described by Rimbert corresponds to the settlement on Björkö during the Viking Age.

The name Hovgård or Hovedgård was a common term in medieval Sweden, referring to an estate belonging to a person of high rank or to the principal estate of a large landholding. The name of the island Adelsö literally means “island of the nobility.”

== Location ==
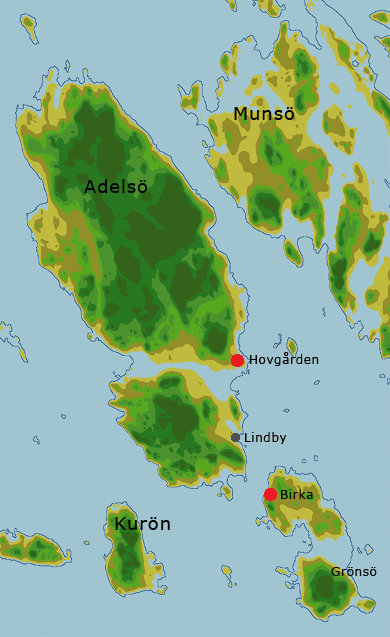
Topographic map of the archipelago around Birka and Hovgården as it would have appeared in the Viking Age. The blue line indicates the current coastline.

Birka and Hovgården are located on the islands of Björkö and Adelsö, respectively, in Lake Mälar, approximately 30 km west of Stockholm. Both islands are part of the Ekerö Municipality within Stockholm County. The islands face each other and are separated by a strait a few hundred meters wide. According to its designation as a World Heritage Site, the protected area covers 226 hectares, including the entire northern part of Björkö and the Hovgården site. A buffer zone of 2,272 hectares surrounds this area, encompassing the remainder of Björkö, a large portion of Adelsö, and part of the lake between the two islands.

Lake Mälar is geologically part of the sub-Cambrian peneplain. (Note: Olausson 2002, pp. 153–155) The region is characterized by numerous faults and fissures, resulting in a rugged landscape and a high density of islands. At the end of the Quaternary glaciations, glaciers exposed bedrock and deposited moraines, while the area that now forms Lake Mälar was submerged. Sediments, particularly clay, accumulated in the deepest parts. Post-glacial rebound gradually raised the land, leading to the emergence of these areas. On Björkö and Adelsö, this process created rocky plateaus, which are generally infertile and forested, alongside clay plains, which rank among the most fertile in Sweden after Scania.

Isostatic rebound continues at an average rate of approximately 0.5 cm per year. During the Viking Age, water levels were around five meters higher than present, and the area of the modern lake was then part of the Baltic Sea. At that time, the current island of Björkö was divided into two sections, with the northern part called Björkö and the southern part called Grönsö, while Hovgården occupied the southern tip of Adelsö.

== History ==
=== Context and foundation ===
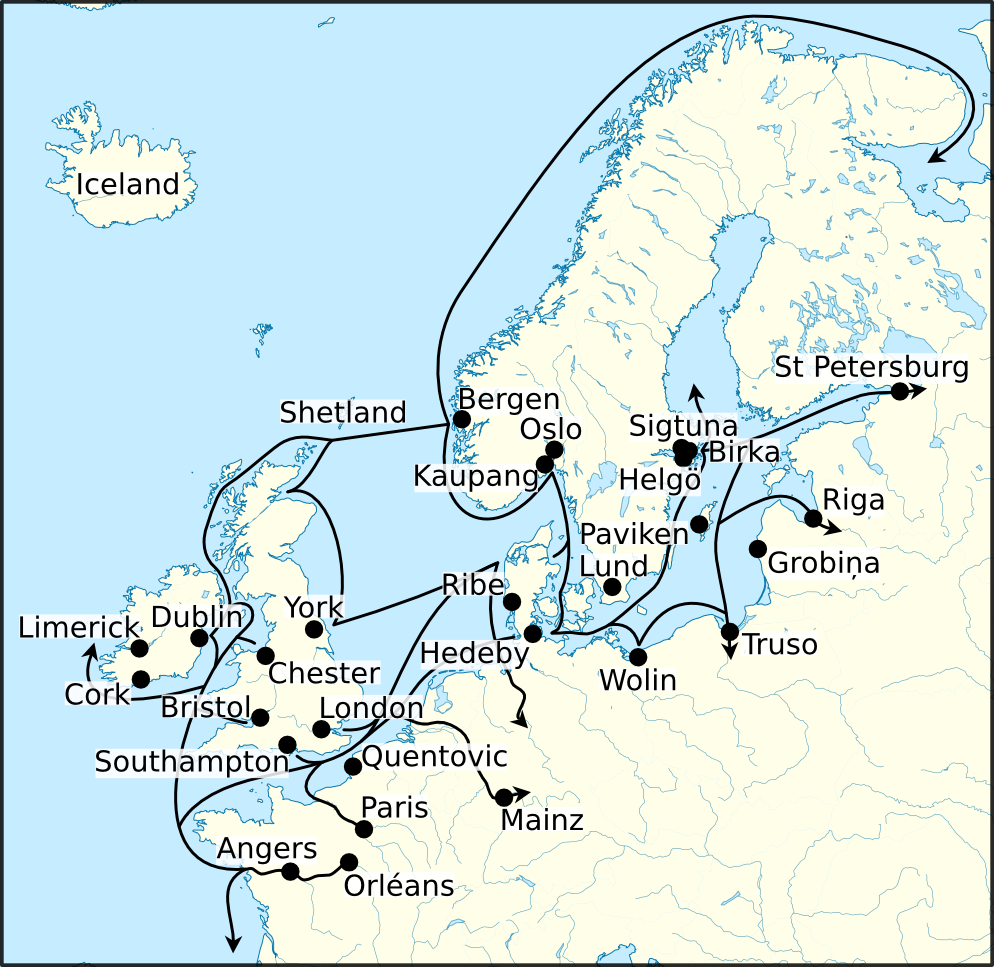
Trade routes in northwestern Europe during the Viking Age.

The earliest evidence of human activity in the area is a cemetery northwest of Hovgården, which appears to have been in use between approximately 600 and 1100. On Grönsö, which was a separate island during this period, Bronze Age cairns have also been identified. The proto-city of Birka and the adjacent royal estate of Hovgården were established in the 8th century. The precise founding date is uncertain but is generally estimated around 750. The style of the earliest artifacts at the site corresponds to the transitional period between the Vendel Age and the Viking Age, at the very end of the 8th century. These artifacts show similarities to objects found at Staraya Ladoga, which was founded around 753 according to dendrochronological analysis. The oldest building at Birka, located near the defensive wall, has been dated to the mid-8th century.

During this period, most of Sweden had an agrarian economy, with inhabitants living on largely self-sufficient farms that combined agriculture, forest resource use, hunting, and fishing. (Note: Peterson 2016, p. 176) The Viking Age saw the development of proto-urban settlements where trade and craft activities were concentrated, both in Sweden and in other regions around the Baltic Sea, with examples including Hedeby, Ribe, and Staraya Ladoga. In Sweden, a similar site existed to some degree during the Vendel period, namely Helgö, located on an island about 10 km southeast of Birka. Helgö was active approximately between 200 and 800 and is considered a predecessor of Birka, although its scale and significance were likely smaller. The site was probably linked to a royal residence at Hundhamra, located on a neighboring island, a pattern that was later repeated with Birka and the royal estate of Hovgården.

The island of Björkö was a favorable location for trade. It is situated on what is now Lake Mälar, which during the Viking Age was an extension of the Baltic Sea and formed the central region of Svealand, serving as a principal route of communication at a time when few developed land routes existed. The island occupies a strategic position at the intersection of several key lake routes: to the south, the Södertälje passage (later closed due to post-glacial rebound and redeveloped in the 19th century with the Södertälje Canal); to the north, the Fyrisleden route toward Gamla Uppsala; to the west, inland regions including access to the metal resources of Bergslagen; and to the east, the passage near present-day Stockholm. Additionally, the network of islands and channels formed by the Mälaren and Stockholm archipelagos provided a significant degree of natural protection for the island’s inhabitants.

=== A center of trade and craftsmanship ===
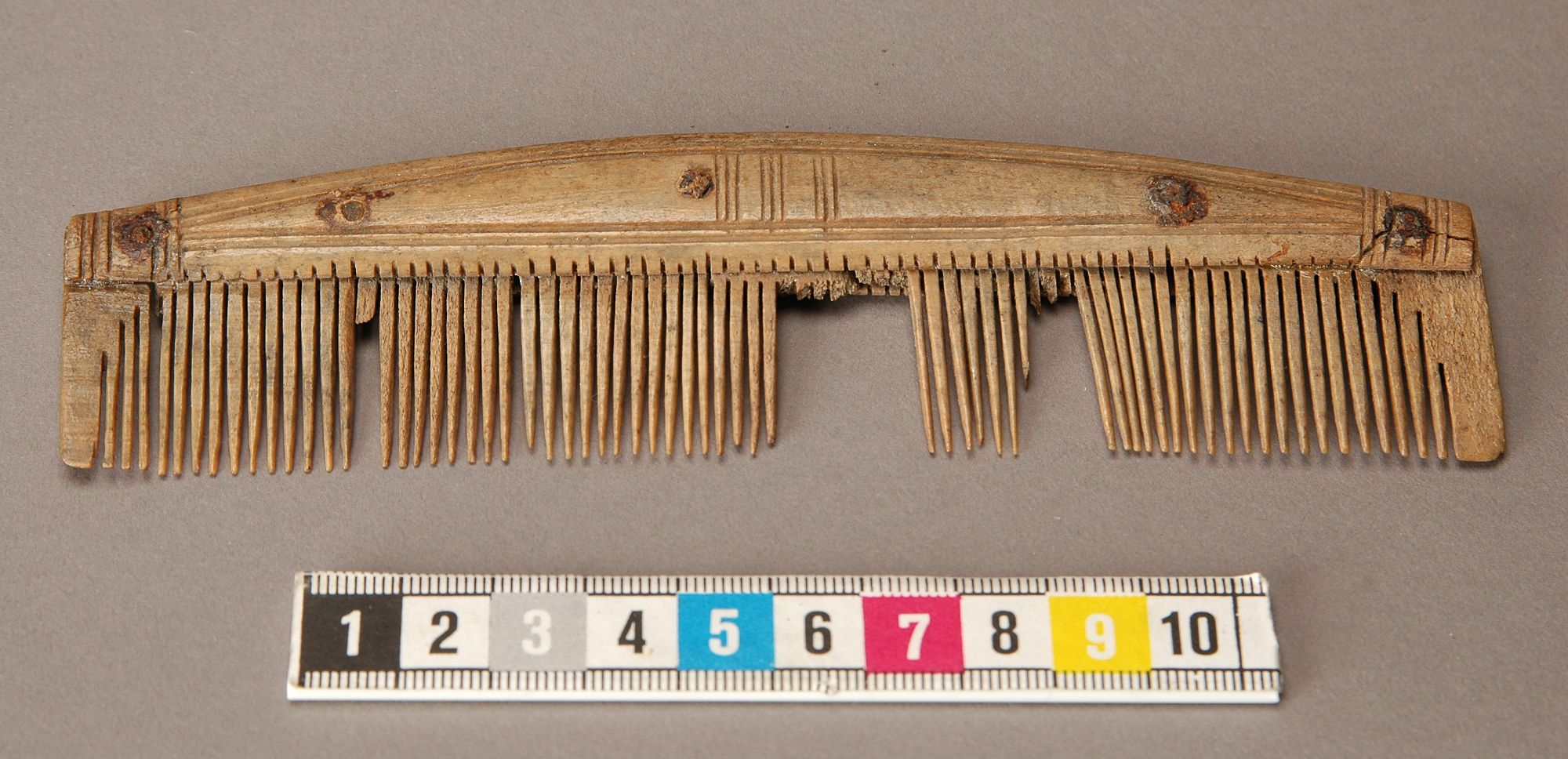
A comb made from deer antler found in the Black Lands. This type of comb was one of the city's typical handicraft products.

In contrast to the agrarian economy prevalent in most of Sweden, Birka functioned primarily as a center for trade and craft production.

The city’s commercial activity can be divided into two main phases. The first phase, from the city’s foundation until the end of the 9th century, was characterized by predominantly Western European trade, particularly with the trading towns of Dorestad and Wolin. The second phase involved increased trade with eastern regions, including present-day Russia and parts of the eastern Muslim world. This development was associated with the establishment of Kievan Rus’ by Swedish settlers (Varangians) and the opening of trade routes along the Volga trade route and Dnieper trade route. During this period, Birka experienced growth, reaching an estimated peak population of 700 to 1,000 inhabitants.

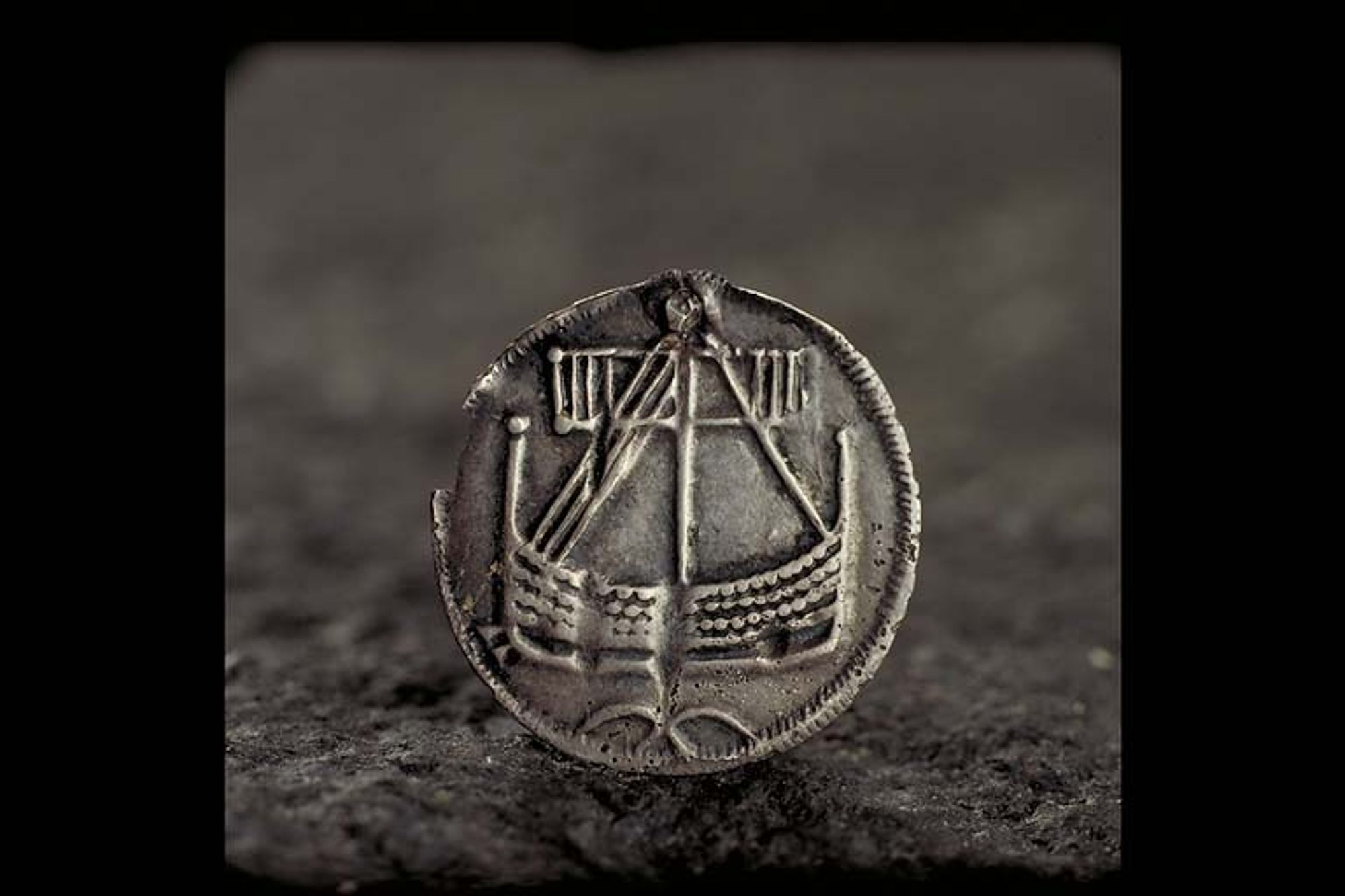
One of the coins from Hedeby, found in a grave north of the fort. There were so many of these coins in Birka that historians initially thought they had been minted in the town. In fact, they were minted in Hedeby.

The main export commodities from Birka included iron from Bergslagen, furs from locally hunted animals or obtained from Sami and Finnic peoples, reindeer or elk antlers, walrus ivory, amber, honey from southern Sweden, and eiderdown. Slaves were also exported to eastern markets. Many of these goods were likely transported from northern Scandinavia to Birka during winter, when snow and ice facilitated overland movement of heavy items. It is also possible that large markets were held on the frozen Baltic Sea near Birka during winter, a practice documented in the Middle Ages.

In Birka, many exported goods were processed locally before being sold. Animal antlers were carved into combs, iron was forged into tools and other items, and furs and leather were tanned. The town also produced textiles and jewelry. Not all craft production was intended for long-distance trade; a significant portion supplied farms in the surrounding region. This local distribution was necessary because Birka was not self-sufficient, and its population relied on regional farms for food, fuel, and building materials. Estimates suggest that, given the limited agricultural surplus, up to one-quarter of the Mälardalen may have been required to sustain the town.

Imported goods included pottery, glass, and luxury items such as silk, Byzantine-style embroidery, and substantial quantities of coins, particularly silver. These imports were rarely distributed to local farms and were generally retained by the town’s merchants.

=== Birka and the attempts to evangelize Sweden ===
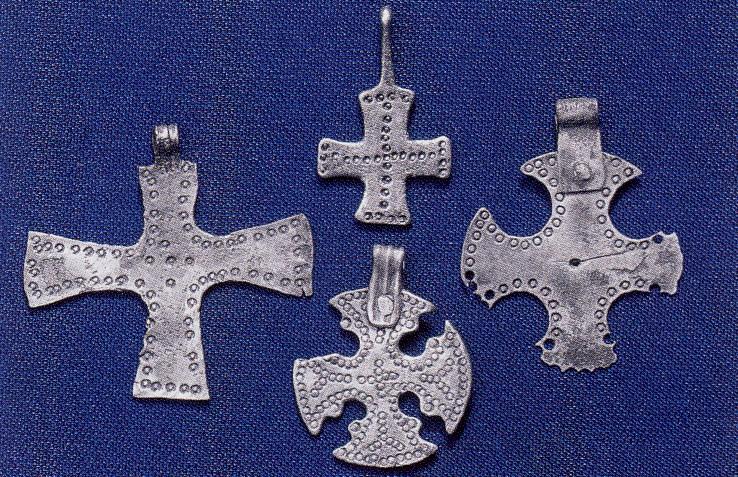
Silver crosses found in women's graves in Birka.

Much of the historical knowledge about Birka derives from two near-contemporary sources: the Vita Anskarii by Rimbert and the Gesta Hammaburgensis ecclesiae pontificum by Adam of Bremen. Both texts focus primarily on the Christian missions to Birka and the broader region of Sweden.

The Vita Anskarii is a biography of Ansgar, written by his companion and successor Rimbert between 869 and 876. Ansgar, a Frankish monk, was sent to Birka in 829 to promote the Christian faith among the Swedish population. During his journey, he encountered difficulties, including an attack by pirates on the Baltic Sea, which resulted in the loss of most of his possessions, including forty holy books. Much of the remainder of the journey was completed on foot. Upon arrival, Ansgar was received by King Björn II at Hauge, who granted him permission to preach.

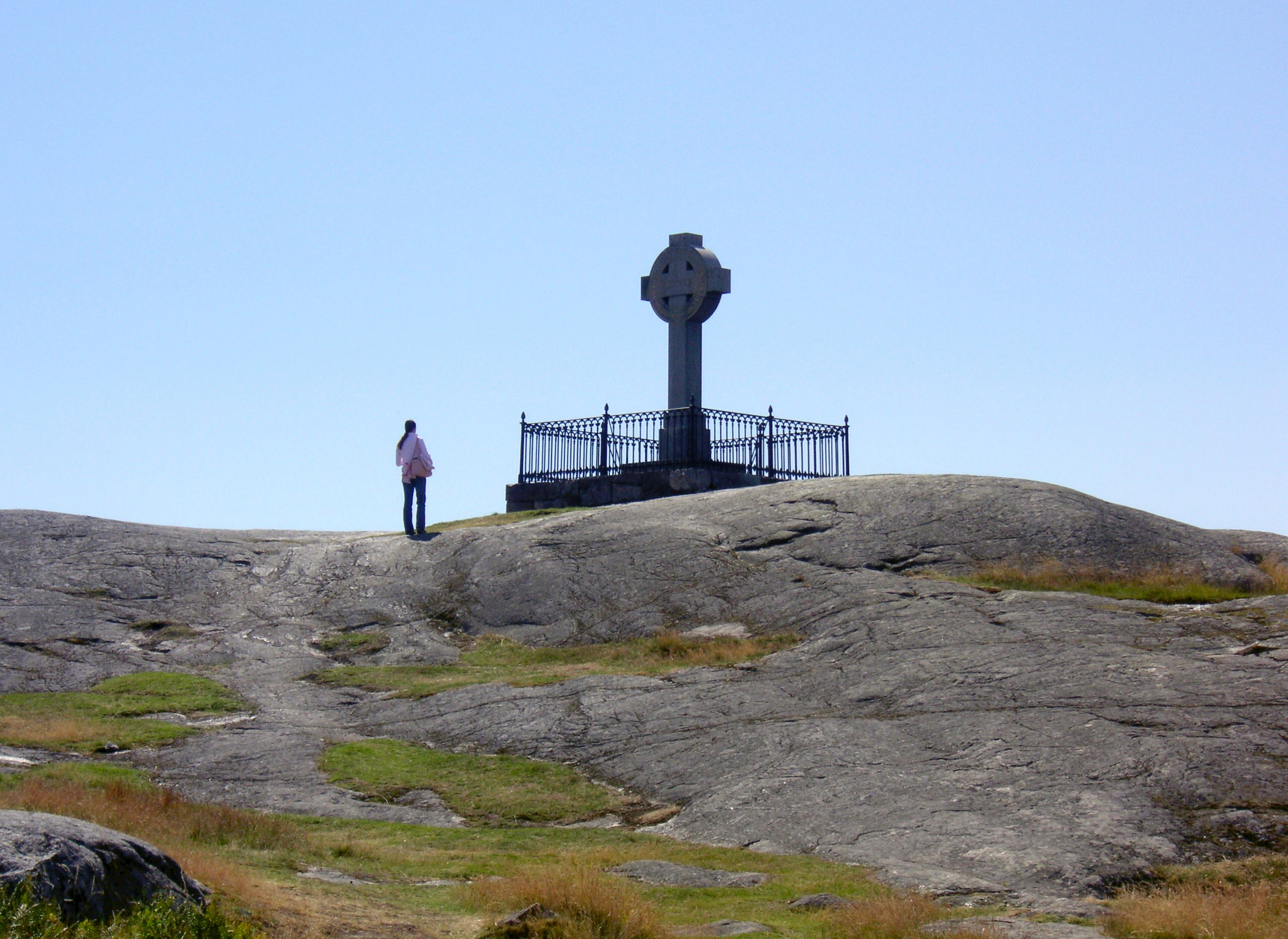
Anschaire Cross erected in 1834 in honor of Anschaire's mission, at the top of the hill where the Viking fort was located.

Ansgar did not convert King Björn II to Christianity, but he baptized the town’s prefect, Hergeir. (Note: Peterson 2016, pp. 166–169) After approximately a year and a half at Birka, Ansgar returned to Hamburg, where he became bishop, and subsequently sent Bishop Gauzbert and his companion Nithard to continue the mission in the town. Their presence was not universally accepted, and in 845, Nithard was killed, Gauzbert’s residence was burned, and he was forced into exile. That same year, a Danish fleet attacked Hamburg, disrupting Ansgar’s organization, leaving Birka without a Christian missionary until 850 or 851, when Ansgar sent the hermit Ardgar to contact Hergeir, who had maintained his faith. Ansgar visited Birka a second time in 852 or 853, accompanied by Erimbert, Gauzbert’s nephew. After negotiations with the king and the assembly, Ansgar was authorized to preach and to construct a church. Erimbert remained after Ansgar’s departure, and over subsequent years, several priests continued the Christian mission. Following Ansgar’s death in 865, the subsequent history of evangelization in Sweden is sparsely documented. However, Archbishop Unni died at Birka in 936 during a mission, indicating that the archbishopric of Hamburg–Bremen continued to maintain involvement in efforts to convert the Nordic population.

=== Political power at Birka and Hovgården ===
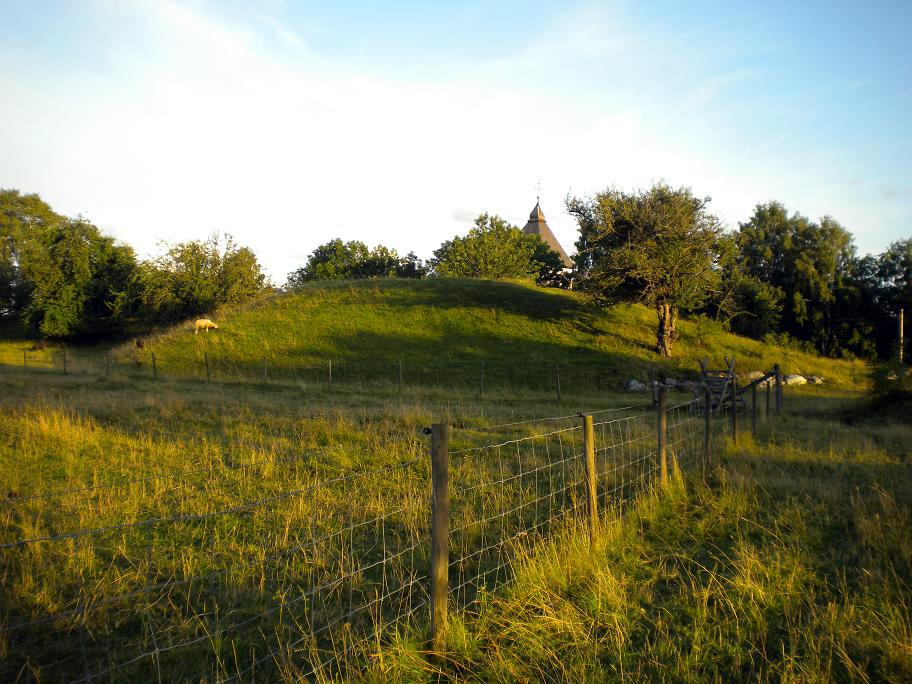
Burial mound at Hovgården, interpreted as the grave of Eric II Björnsson, father of Björn II.

Although the Vita Anskarii and Gesta Hammaburgensis ecclesiae pontificum focus primarily on religious activity in Sweden, they also provide information on the political context around Birka. During Ansgar’s first journey, the reigning king was Björn II, who is reported not to have resided at Birka. Historians generally agree that he most likely ruled from Hovgården. By the 850s, when Ansgar made his second visit, the king was Olof I of Sweden. Between the two visits, a succession dispute occurred between Björn and his brother Anund II of Uppsala, who had been exiled for unknown reasons and sought refuge in Denmark. Anund secured Danish support to reclaim the throne, offering Birka in exchange. The Danish fleet of twenty-one ships joined Anund’s eleven ships in preparation for the campaign. As King Björn was absent from Birka, Hergeir, the town’s prefect, negotiated peace, providing Anund with one hundred pounds of silver on behalf of the inhabitants. Anund subsequently attempted to dissuade the Danes from attacking the town, suggesting that the outcome be determined by drawing lots. The result of the lots indicated that Birka should be spared, and the Danish fleet instead attacked a Slavic settlement.

It is not known whether the rulers at Hovgården held authority over all of Sweden or were primarily local leaders. Before the succession conflict, Björn II likely co-ruled with his brother Anund II of Uppsala, with Björn residing at Hovgården and Anund at Gamla Uppsala. Later in the Vita Anskarii, a Swedish representative of the “pagan gods,” probably an emissary from Gamla Uppsala, referred to “your former king Erik” while visiting Birka, then ruled by Olof I of Sweden, suggesting that this king was not recognized by the emissary’s constituency. Historians propose that the Suione aristocracy may have been in tension with or cautious of the ruler of Birka. One hypothesis is that the king of Birka belonged to a new dynasty, the Munsö dynasty, of Gothic origin, while the Suione aristocracy remained centered at Gamla Uppsala. In this context, Fornsigtuna, founded around the same time as Birka, may have been established in opposition, at a strategic location on the narrow channel connecting Birka and Gamla Uppsala. This interpretation provides context for Adam of Bremen’s description of Birka as “the city of the Goths situated in the midst of the Suione territories.”

While the ruler at Hovgården exercised authority over the settlement, Birka maintained an independent political structure, with an assembly (Thing) and a prefect responsible for governance. During this period, each region (Folkland or Hundred) had its own assembly and legal code, which often prioritized the interests of local inhabitants over those of outsiders. For a trade-dependent town with a significant foreign population, and situated at the boundary of several provinces, this arrangement was impractical. Birka was therefore granted its own assembly and a distinct legal code, known as the Björkö law or Bjarkey law, which provided protection to all free men regardless of origin. This legal framework likely served as a model for other Scandinavian merchant towns during the Middle Ages, many of which were referred to as Birk and adopted their own Bjarkey laws. The Bjarkey law may also have influenced the development of municipal privileges (Stadsprivilegier) that defined the legal status of towns in Sweden from the Middle Ages onward. Consequently, Birka is sometimes regarded as the first town in Sweden.

=== Decline ===
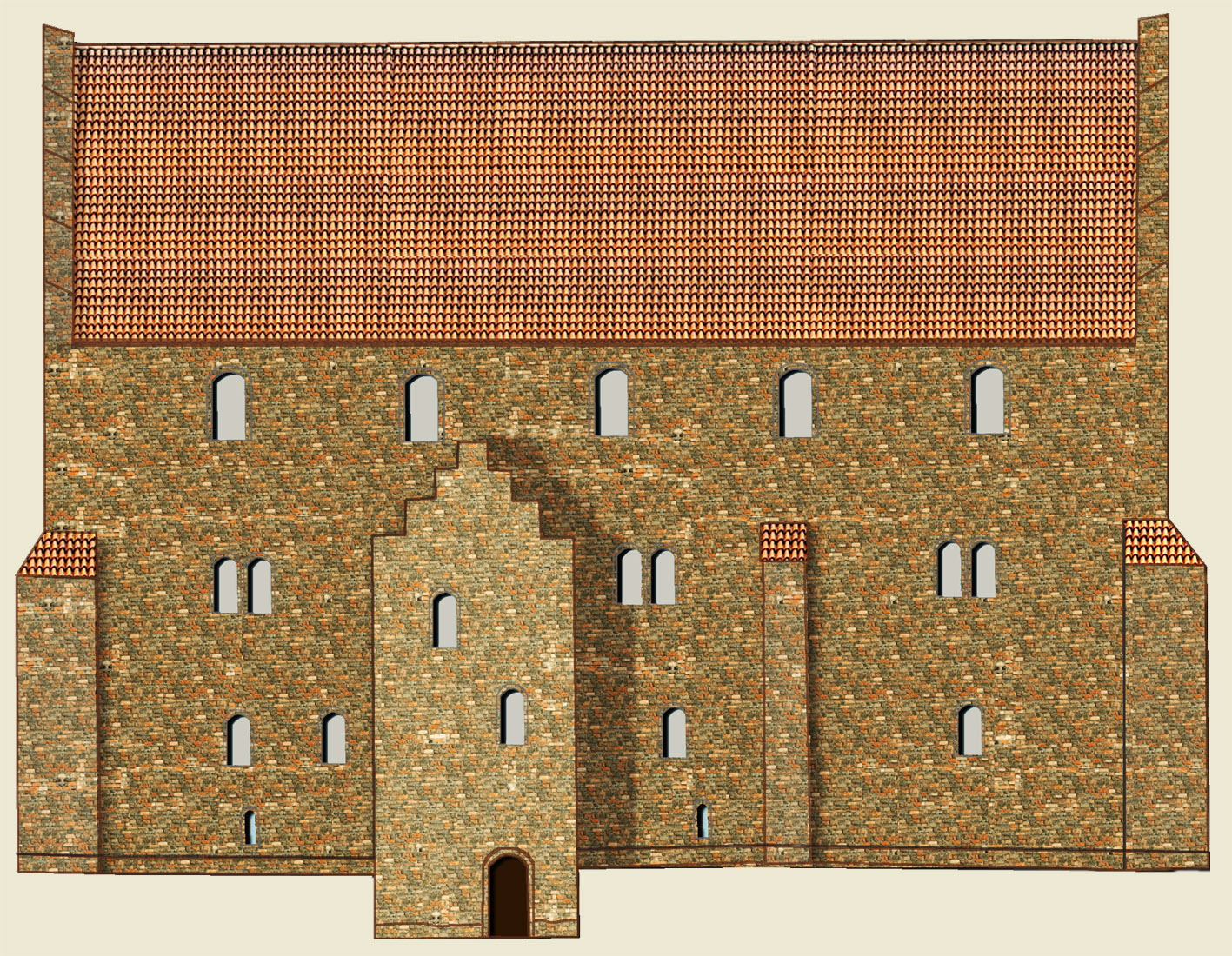
Reconstruction of Alsnö Hus palace, as it would have appeared in 1280.

Birka underwent a period of rapid decline around the year 970. Numismatic evidence indicates that coins dating to 962 have been found at the site, but no coins from the extensive Anglo-Saxon issues of the 980s have been recovered. Some inhabitants may have remained in the central part of the town into the 11th century, as suggested by archaeological finds, but the period of economic and social prosperity had ended. According to Adam of Bremen, Adalvard the Younger passed through Birka in the 1060s on his way to Sigtuna to locate the tomb of Archbishop Unni, and reported the site as completely abandoned.

The reasons for the abandonment of Birka are not definitively established and were likely the result of multiple factors. One possible factor is post-glacial rebound, which altered the morphology of the Baltic Sea and closed certain navigation channels important for Birka, particularly the Södertälje passage. A reduction in trade with eastern regions, possibly linked to the campaigns of Sviatoslav I in the Volga area, may also have contributed. Archaeological evidence from the Garrison site south of the town indicates that a major battle occurred around the time of the estimated abandonment, resulting in the destruction of several buildings. It is additionally possible that the settlement’s population and functions were gradually transferred to Sigtuna, founded around 980, which subsequently became the principal trade center in the Lake Mälar region.

In contrast, Hovgården appears to have retained its significance as a royal estate after the abandonment of Birka, as indicated by the Hovgården runestone, erected around 1070. The church of Adelsö was constructed nearby in the 12th century, and the estate is referenced in a document from 1200 as a royal domain (Mansionem Regiam Alsnu). Magnus III of Sweden commissioned the construction of the palace Alsnö hus around 1270, likely as a summer residence. This brick building, a novel construction material in the region at the time, was erected on the site of the former Viking stronghold. Alsnö hus played a notable role in Swedish history, including the promulgation of the Ordinance of Alsnö (or Statute of Alsnö) in 1279 or 1280, which established the legal status of the Swedish nobility. The palace was destroyed at the end of the 14th century, possibly during attacks by the Victual Brothers.

=== Archaeological excavations and protection ===
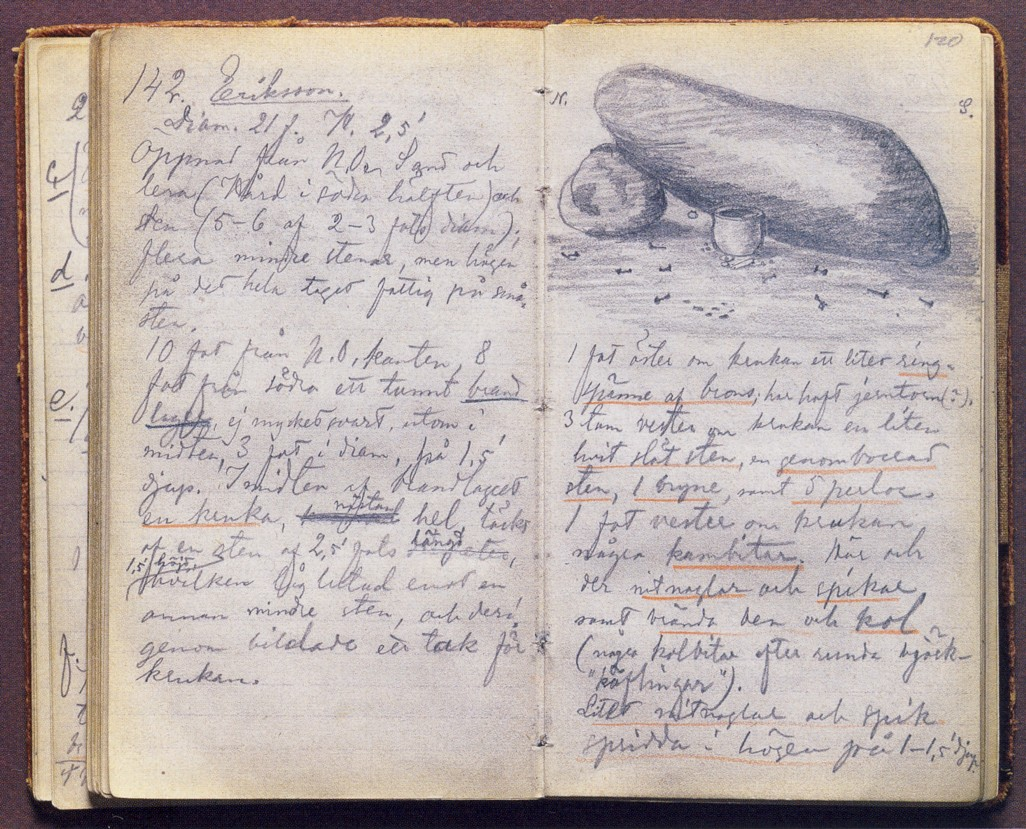
Page from Hjalmar Stolpe's journal describing the excavations in 1875.

After the abandonment of Birka and Hovgården, both sites were largely forgotten. In the 1680s, the archaeologist Johan Hadorph, while studying the Bjarkey laws, proposed that these laws were associated with Björkö. He conducted excavations, representing the first known archaeological investigations at Birka, and the objects recovered are now displayed at the Swedish History Museum. Excavations resumed in 1825 under Alexander Seton, who conducted more detailed studies of several graves at Hemlanden, east of the town. In 1834, the Ansgar Cross was erected to commemorate the archbishop’s initial visit, reflecting the contemporary historical view that Björkö corresponded to the Birka described in early sources.

The first extensive archaeological excavations at Birka were conducted under the direction of Hjalmar Stolpe, beginning in 1871. Stolpe initially visited the site in search of amber, which sometimes contains preserved insects. During his investigations, he identified the Black Earth, recognizing it as the location of the Viking settlement, and subsequently initiated systematic excavations. Stolpe conducted research at Birka for nearly twenty years, focusing on the Black Earth and the graves at Hemlanden, and introduced the site to the international community in 1874 when it hosted an archaeology congress. The excavations yielded a substantial number of artifacts, exceeding the capacity for complete analysis during his lifetime.

The conclusion of Stolpe’s research coincided with growing interest in heritage preservation in Sweden. Following the establishment of the country’s first national parks in 1909, the state acquired a substantial portion of Björkö between 1912 and 1914 to protect the site for future generations. During this period, management practices reflected contemporary ideas of minimal human intervention, resulting in extensive vegetation that made parts of the site difficult to access. Research attention during this time focused primarily on Hovgården. Between 1916 and 1920, Bengt Thordeman conducted studies of the palace Alsnö hus, which indicated the presence of a Viking settlement in the vicinity of the medieval building. Concurrently, Hanna Rydh carried out investigations of graves at the Hovgården site.

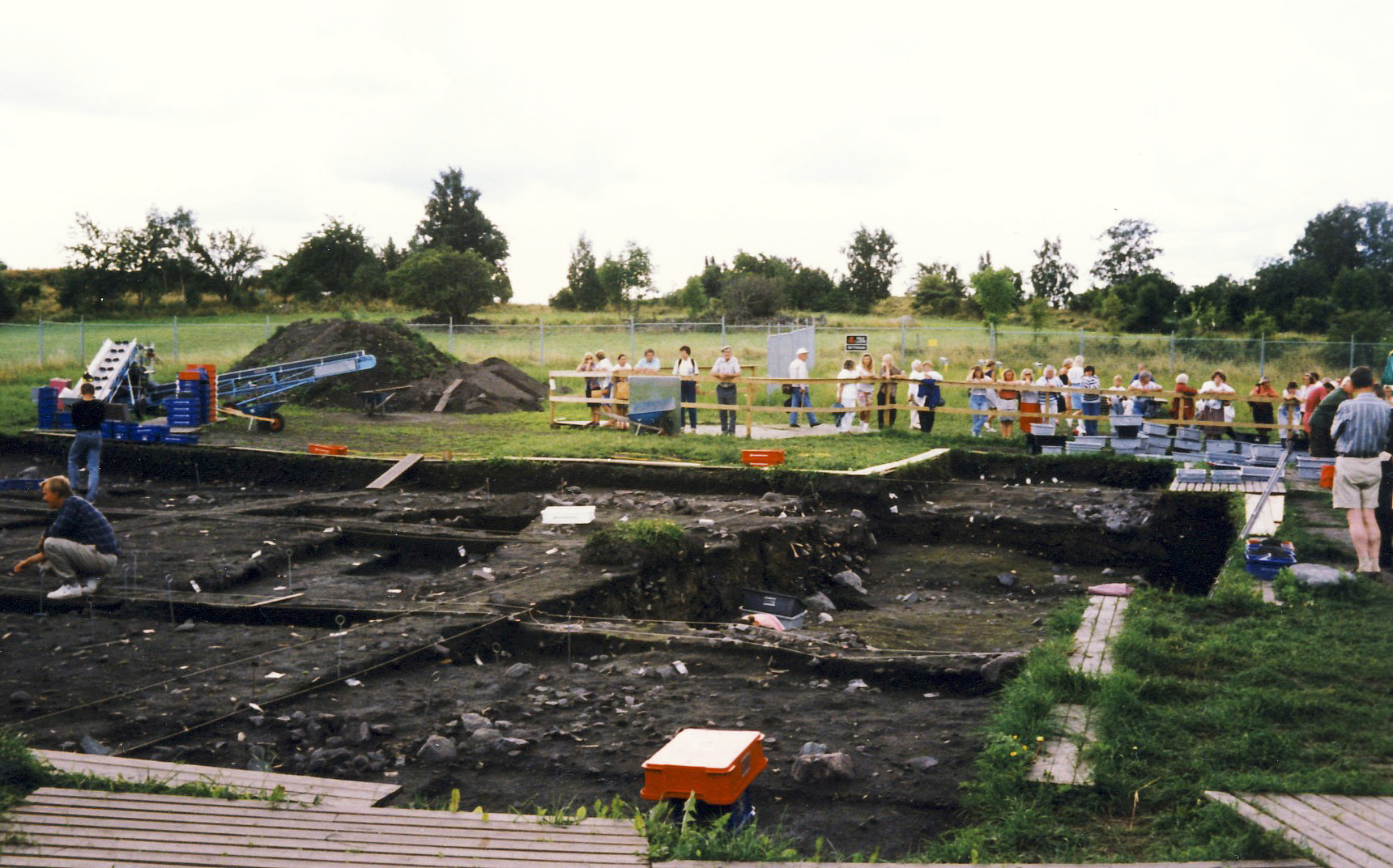
Excavations in the Black Lands in 1991.

The management and study of Birka changed in 1931 with the implementation of active site restoration, including a grazing program to control vegetation. During this period, Holger Arbman conducted excavations at the enclosure wall and the area between the Black Earth and the fort, identifying the Garrison site. He also resumed analysis of the artifacts from Hjalmar Stolpe’s excavations, publishing his findings in the early 1940s in a two-volume work titled Birka I. The complete inventory of Stolpe’s material was later finalized by his successor Greta Arwidsson, who published Birka II in three volumes between 1984 and 1988. Arbman also carried out excavations at Hovgården in 1966 to more precisely locate the remains of Viking-period structures. Minor excavations between 1969 and 1971 confirmed the presence of a Viking-age harbor. From the 1970s onward, research at Birka became more systematic, initially focusing on the Black Earth and the graves. Since 1999, investigations have expanded to include military structures, such as the fort and the Garrison. Between 1992 and 1994, further archaeological work at Hovgården identified the Viking ruins and mapped both the Viking and medieval harbor areas.

In 1993, the protection of Birka and Hovgården was reinforced through their inscription on the UNESCO World Heritage List under criteria (iii) and (iv), with the following justifications:

Criterion iii: The Birka–Hovgården ensemble provides exceptionally well-preserved testimony to the highly developed trading network of the Vikings during the two centuries of their phenomenal economic and political expansion.

Criterion iv: Birka is one of the most complete and best-preserved examples of a Viking trading town between the 8th and 10th centuries.

== Archaeological site ==
Map of Birka.

Birka was abandoned abruptly at the end of the 10th century and has subsequently experienced only limited human activity, primarily agricultural, which has contributed to the site’s well-preserved archaeological condition.

=== Black Earth ===
The central area of Birka is known as the “Dark earth” (Svarta Jorden), which corresponds to the main inhabited zone during the Viking Age. The term refers to an archaeological layer rich in organic material, resulting in a dark appearance, and indicating prolonged human occupation. At Birka, this layer reaches a thickness of up to 2 meters (Note: Olausson 2002, pp. 155–159) and covers approximately 7 hectares, bounded to the east by the enclosure wall and to the west by the contemporary coastline. Phosphorus content provides an additional indicator of extended habitation. Analyses show that the phosphorus concentration of the Black Earth is substantially higher than that of the surrounding terrain, suggesting that the inhabited area extended beyond the wall toward the northeast, encompassing approximately 13 hectares. The presence of settlements outside the enclosure may reflect changes in the town’s size or layout, with the possibility that the settlement initially extended further east before later shifting or contracting westward prior to construction of the wall. The upper layers of the Black Earth have been partially affected by agricultural activity on the island since the town’s abandonment.

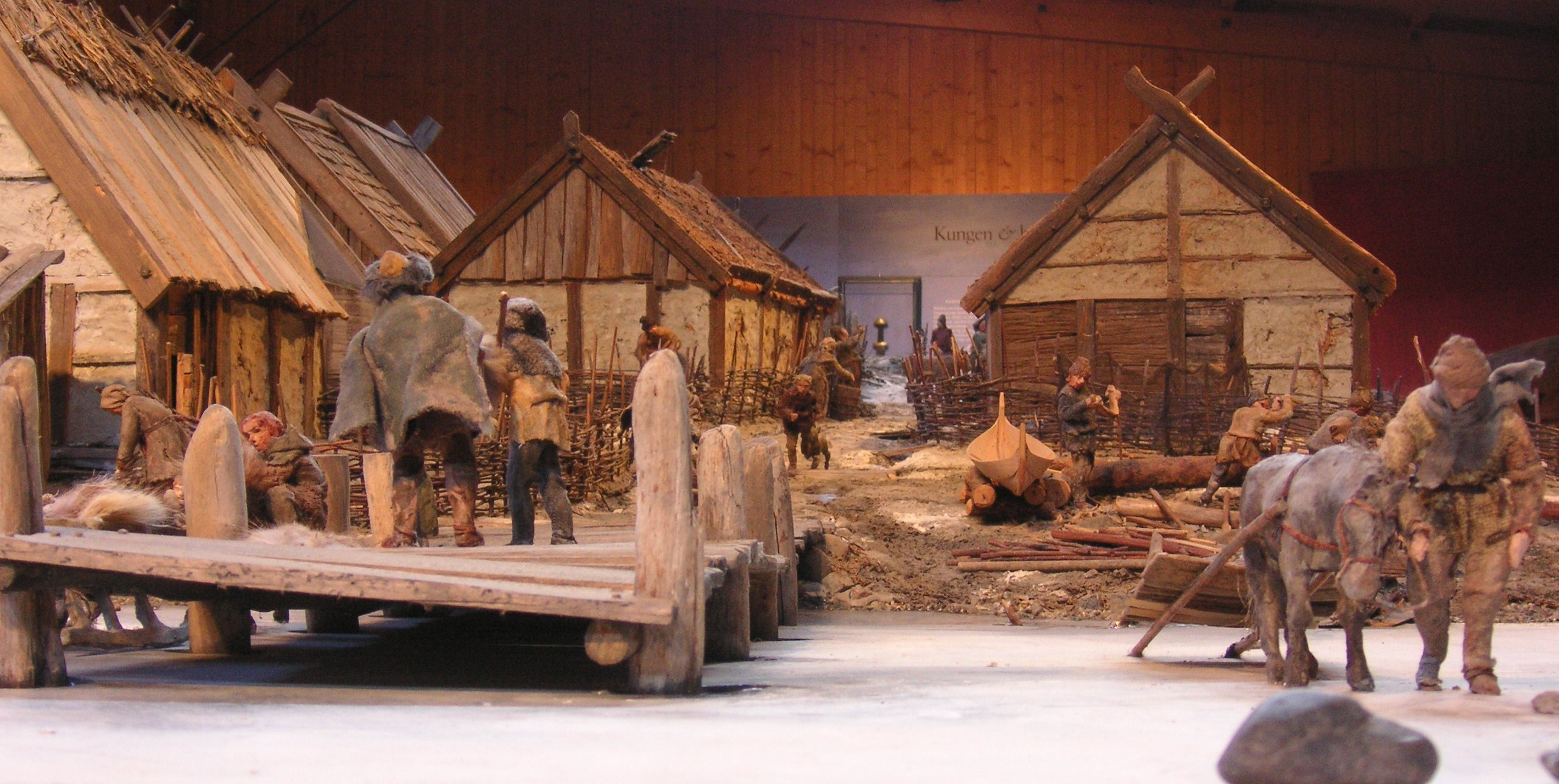
Model of Birka in the site museum.

Excavations of the Black Earth have provided extensive information on the organization of Birka and the daily life of its inhabitants. The settlement was arranged in plots delineated by streets with ditches, with each plot typically containing one or two houses and auxiliary buildings used as workshops or shops. A significant portion of the population consisted of merchants and artisans. The buildings were generally timber-framed, with wattle-and-daub walls and roofs constructed from thatch, wood, or turf.

The high pH and phosphorus content of the soil have facilitated the preservation of metals. Consequently, a large number of bronze and iron objects, as well as coins—particularly of Arabic origin—have been recovered, reflecting Birka’s trade connections with eastern regions. Excavations have also uncovered objects made of glass, ceramic, bone, and textiles, illustrating both the material culture associated with local production and trade, and everyday life in Viking Age Scandinavia. Archaeological evidence further provides insight into dietary practices, including the regular consumption of cattle, pigs, sheep, goats, various bird species, and fish, as indicated by the remains found at the site.

=== Harbors ===
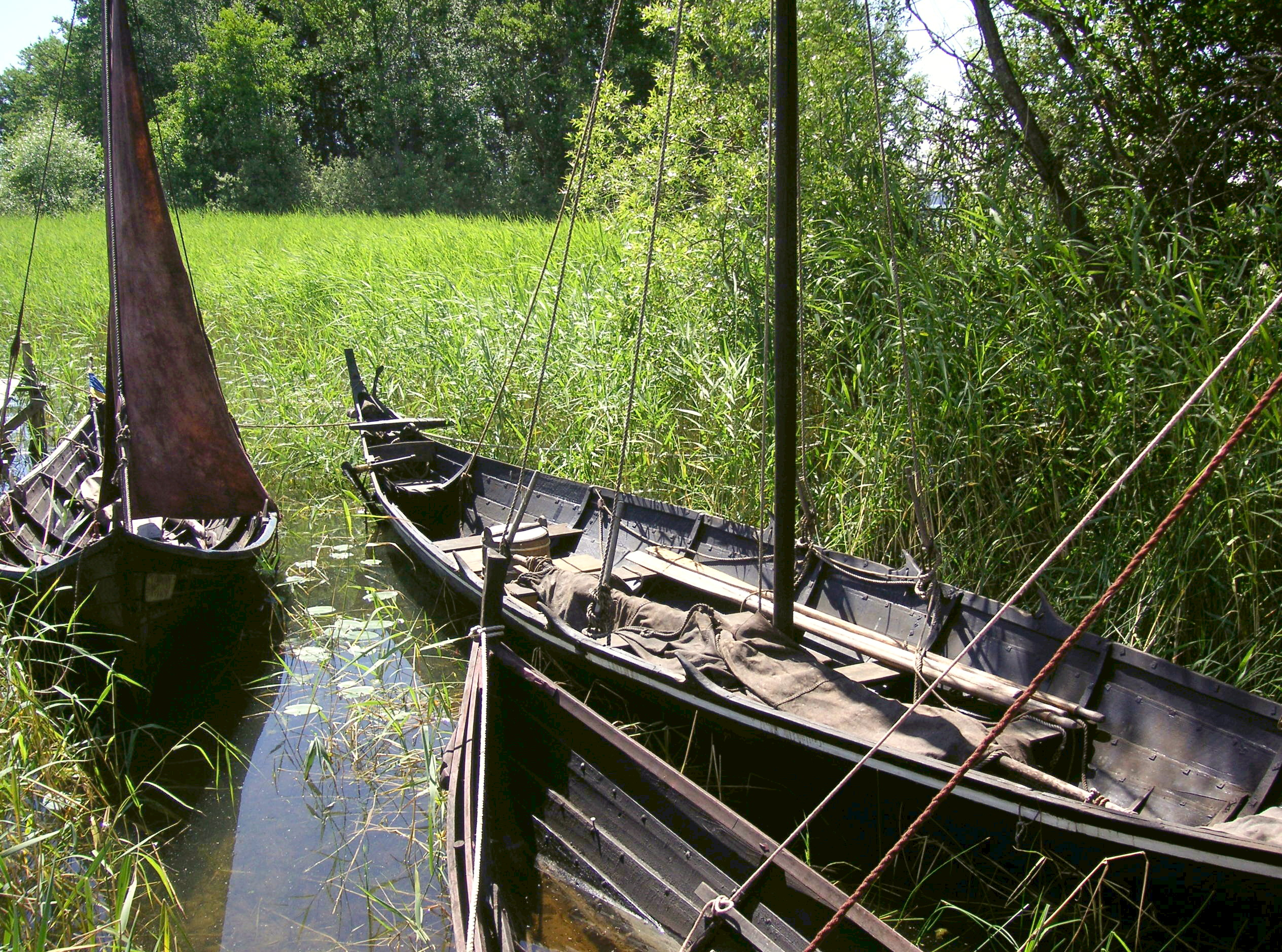
Reconstructions of Viking ships in Birka.

As a settlement situated on an island and oriented toward trade, Birka relied on harbors for maritime activity. The western side of the town was bordered by a shallow bay, which was likely used as an anchorage. Two locations retain the name hamn, indicating harbors: Kugghamn, at the northern end of the enclosure wall, and Korshamn, located slightly farther east. The name Kugghamn may refer to the cog, a type of vessel with a deeper draft than typical Viking ships, suggesting the need for a deeper harbor. It is also possible that another harbor existed in the Salviksgropen bay, farther to the east.

Due to the shallow draft of many Viking ships, it was initially assumed that quays were unnecessary. However, ships of the period varied in size, and larger vessels likely required specific docking structures. Excavations conducted between 1969 and 1971 uncovered a quay near the Black Earth, consisting of a pile of rough stones measuring approximately 3 × 10 meters, along with the remains of wooden posts. Similar quays have since been identified at other Viking Age sites in the Nordic region. Additional rectangular stone structures found at Kugghamn and Korshamn are also interpreted as quays of the same type.

=== Defensive installations ===
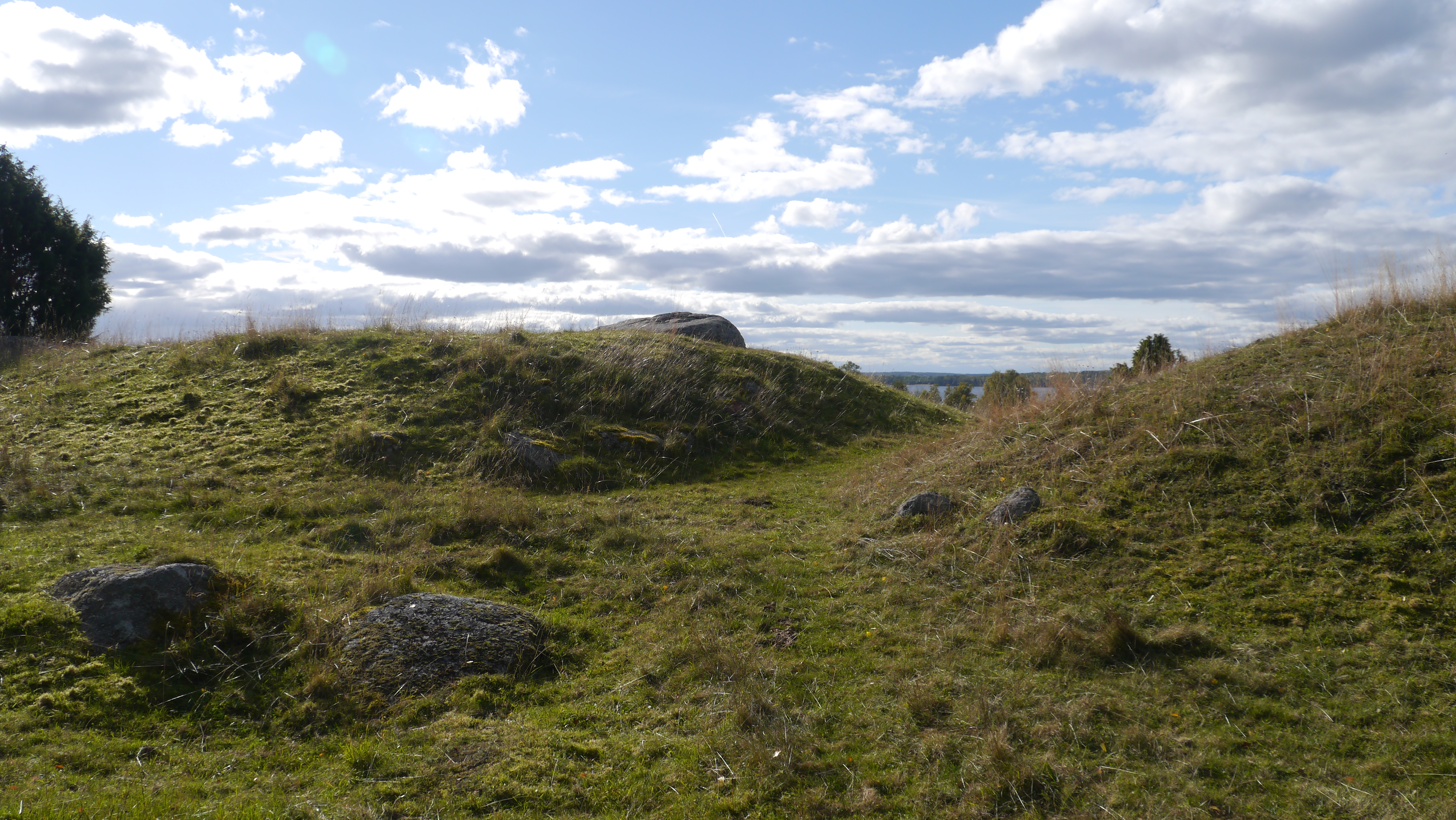
One of the “gates” in the ruins of Birka's surrounding wall.

Birka contained several defensive installations that were constructed at different periods throughout the town’s history.

The proto-town was enclosed by a semi-circular wall, with the western part of the settlement in direct contact with the Baltic Sea. Remains of this wall are still partially visible today, extending over a length of 450 meters, but it originally continued southward to the fort, for an estimated total length of 700 meters. The missing section was probably destroyed by agricultural activity. The wall was a hollow construction, composed of two parallel stone faces with a core filled with earth and turf, and it was probably topped with wooden palisades and towers at the gates. In several areas, older burial mounds were incorporated into the structure. Construction occurred in several stages, but certainly after the year 900. One section can be more precisely dated to after 925, based on a coin discovered beneath it. It is likely that an earlier wall existed prior to this, but it may have been destroyed and subsequently rebuilt to accommodate the growing size of the town. The function of the wall likely evolved over time: initially, it may have served primarily administrative purposes, while during the 10th century it became more defensive, possibly reflecting an increase in threats to the settlement.

On an island such as Birka, the primary threat was likely maritime. To address this, the enclosure wall was extended into the water with a wooden structure that protected the bay and the harbor on the western side of the town. This type of installation typically consisted of vertical wooden posts driven into the bay, which could at certain points be opened or closed using floating gates to control access to the harbor. Some of these wooden posts are still visible when the lake level is low.

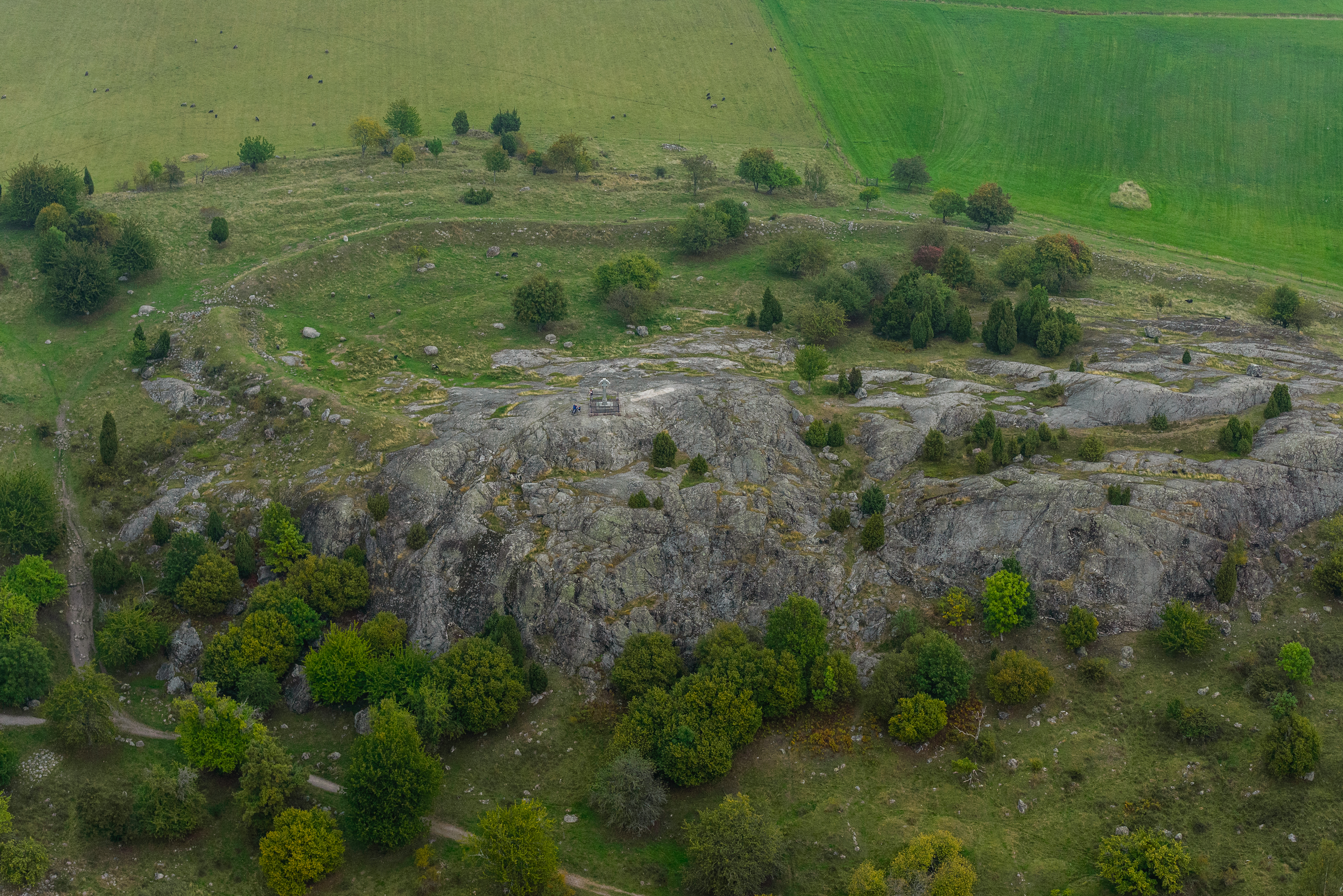
The fort seen from the west. The cliff in the foreground and the ruins of the semicircular rampart are clearly visible.

According to the Vita Anskarii, during Anund’s attack, merchants and inhabitants sought refuge in a fort located near the town. (Note: Olausson 2002, pp. 159–161) This fort is likely the structure situated south of Birka, on the island’s highest point. Known as “the fort” (Borgen), it is a hillfort—a type of fortification built on a natural promontory that was common in Europe from the Bronze Age onward. In the Lake Mälar region, approximately 500 hillforts have been identified, most dating to the Migration Period, when they provided protection during times of instability. By the Viking Age, this type of fort had become rare, and the hillfort at Birka represents a transitional form between traditional Germanic Iron Age forts and medieval castles, possibly influenced by other European defensive structures, such as ringforts. It is among the largest known buildings from this period in Sweden and remains one of the most prominent features at Birka. The fort has a semi-circular rampart approximately 350 meters long, 2–3 meters high, and 7–8 meters thick. The rampart is interrupted on the western side, where the hill forms a cliff that, during the Viking Age, directly bordered the sea, providing natural protection. A 1996 analysis of a section of the wall indicated that it is a hollow structure and was topped by a wooden parapet or battlements. Construction of the fort appears to coincide with the founding of Birka, though two construction phases can be distinguished. The initial rampart burned at the beginning of the 9th century, while a later, more robust rampart endured several fires between the late 10th century and early 11th century. Similar to the town’s enclosure wall, the later rampart was built over several burial mounds, including a particularly large grave containing a man and his horse, dated to the mid-8th century, near the estimated foundation of Birka. This grave likely belonged to a person of high status, possibly associated with the families that established the town.

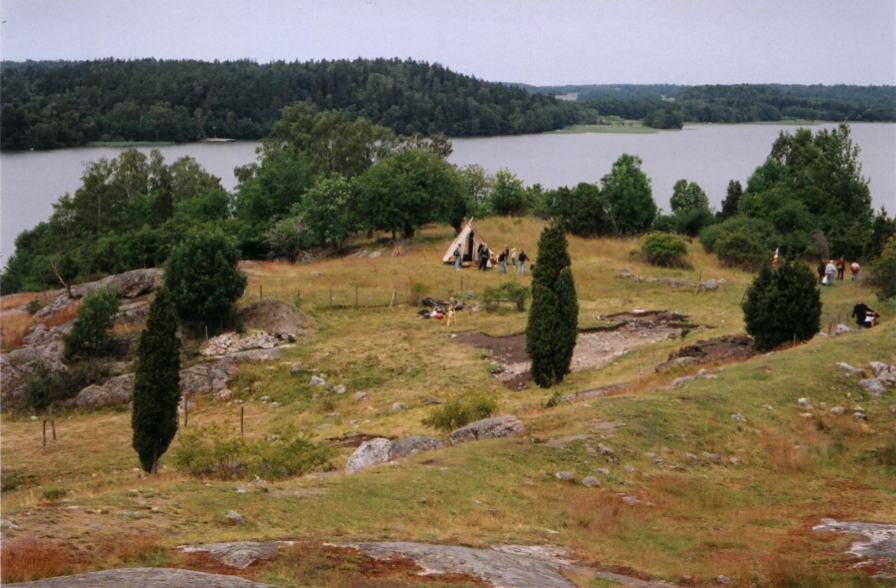
Excavations of the Garrison in 2004.

The northern section of the town’s wall contains two openings, likely serving as access gates. The northwestern gate leads to a series of four terraces, which were constructed to compensate for the steep slope between the fort and the lake. (Note: Olausson 2002, pp. 161–163) This area may have represented a potential weak point in the town’s defenses, as it forms a valley between two hills, providing access from the sea. During the excavations of the 1930s, this area was referred to as “the Garrison” (Garnisonen) because of the large quantity of weapons found and the relative absence of artifacts typically associated with female activity. More recent excavations indicate that the terraces included several buildings dating from the early 9th century to the end of the town’s occupation, enclosed by palisades. Some of these structures were likely dwellings or workshops, including a forge, while the most prominent building, known as “the warriors’ hall” (Krigarnas hus), dates from the second half of the 10th century. Located on the largest terrace, the hall measured approximately 19 meters in length and 9.5 meters in width, comparable in scale to the great hall at Gamla Uppsala. The exterior walls were double, consisting of an outer timber-framed wall and an inner wattle-and-daub wall, providing insulation. The roof was supported by two rows of pillars, and the interior was probably divided into two rooms, each containing a hearth. The northwestern section of the hall may have functioned as a place of honor, as indicated by high-status artifacts discovered in this area. Evidence also suggests that the hall was used for animal or object sacrifices, possibly in honor of Odin. Excavations uncovered a large number of chests, locks, and a wide range of weapons and armor, many showing eastern influences. The hall and other structures in the Garrison appear to have been burned toward the end of the 10th century, and weapons scattered across the site suggest that a violent confrontation occurred, possibly involving attackers arriving by sea. This event may have contributed to the eventual abandonment of Birka, although the connection is not definitively established.

=== Burials ===
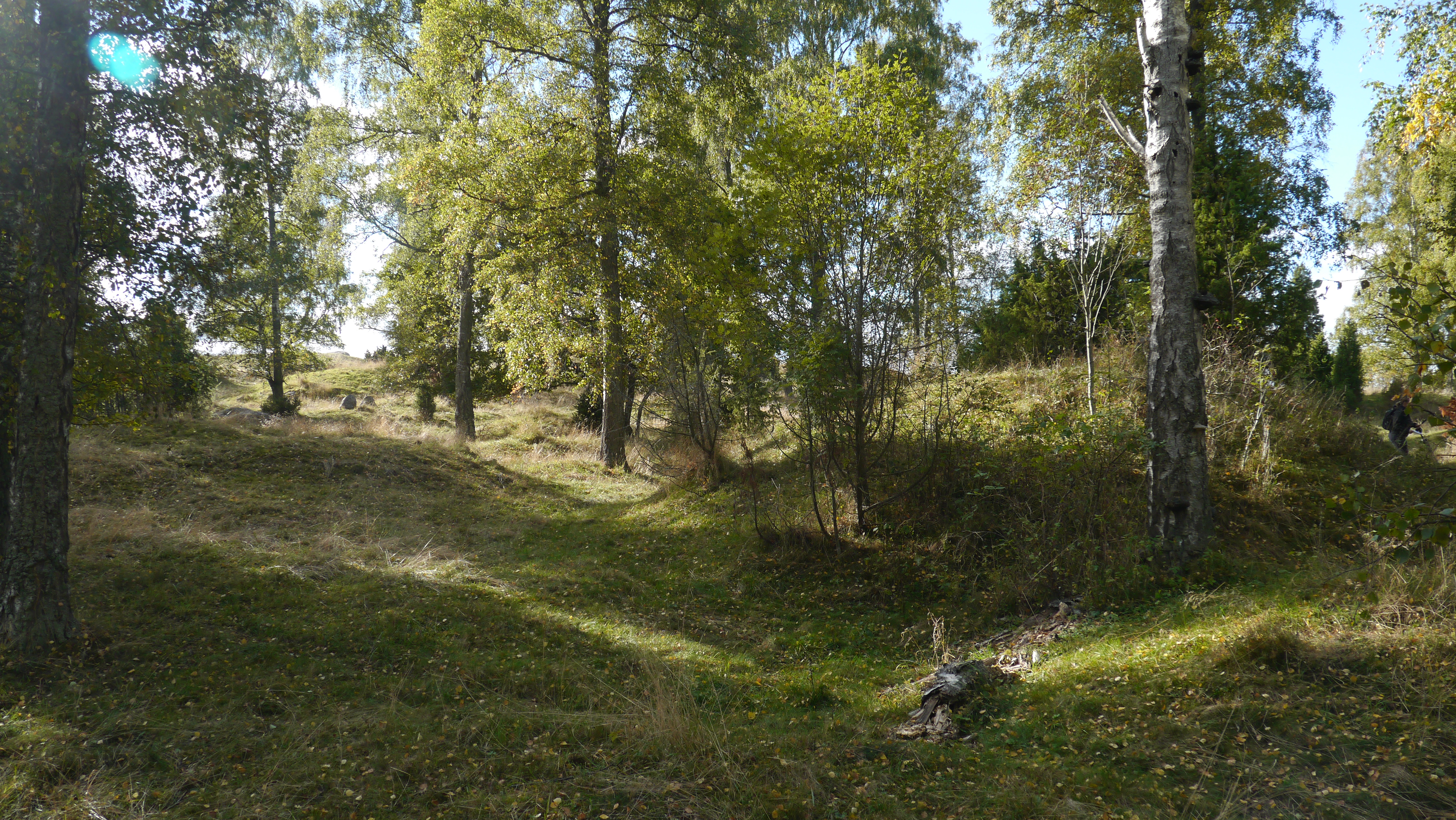
The burial mounds at Hemlanden are often very close to each other.

The island of Björkö contains at least 2,500 graves distributed across multiple sites. The largest cemetery is the Hemlanden site, located northeast of the Black Earth area, with approximately 1,600 burials, making it one of the most significant protohistoric cemeteries in Scandinavia. Other notable cemeteries include a site south of the fort at Bjorgs Hage and Kvarnbacka, with around 400 graves, and a smaller cemetery located between the fort and the Black Earth area. Only about 1,100 graves have been systematically studied, and some contain multiple individuals, complicating efforts to determine the exact number of people buried on the island.

The graves on Björkö exhibit considerable variation and provide extensive information about the society and inhabitants of Birka. The most common burial practice among Scandinavian populations during the Viking Age, associated with pre-Christian Scandinavian religion, was cremation, with ashes placed under burial mounds or, less frequently, under stone structures such as stone ships or triangular cairns (treudd). A significant proportion of the graves contain complete skeletons, which may indicate either a local population that had converted to Christianity or foreign individuals buried according to their own customs. In addition, several chamber graves have been identified, in which the body and associated objects were placed within a wooden chamber, often covered by a large burial mound. This form of burial was likely reserved for wealthy individuals or those of high social status. A total of 111 chamber graves have been discovered and excavated, representing a notably high concentration for Sweden and suggesting influence from broader European practices. Many of these graves contain couples, and the overall distribution of sexes across the cemeteries appears to be relatively balanced.

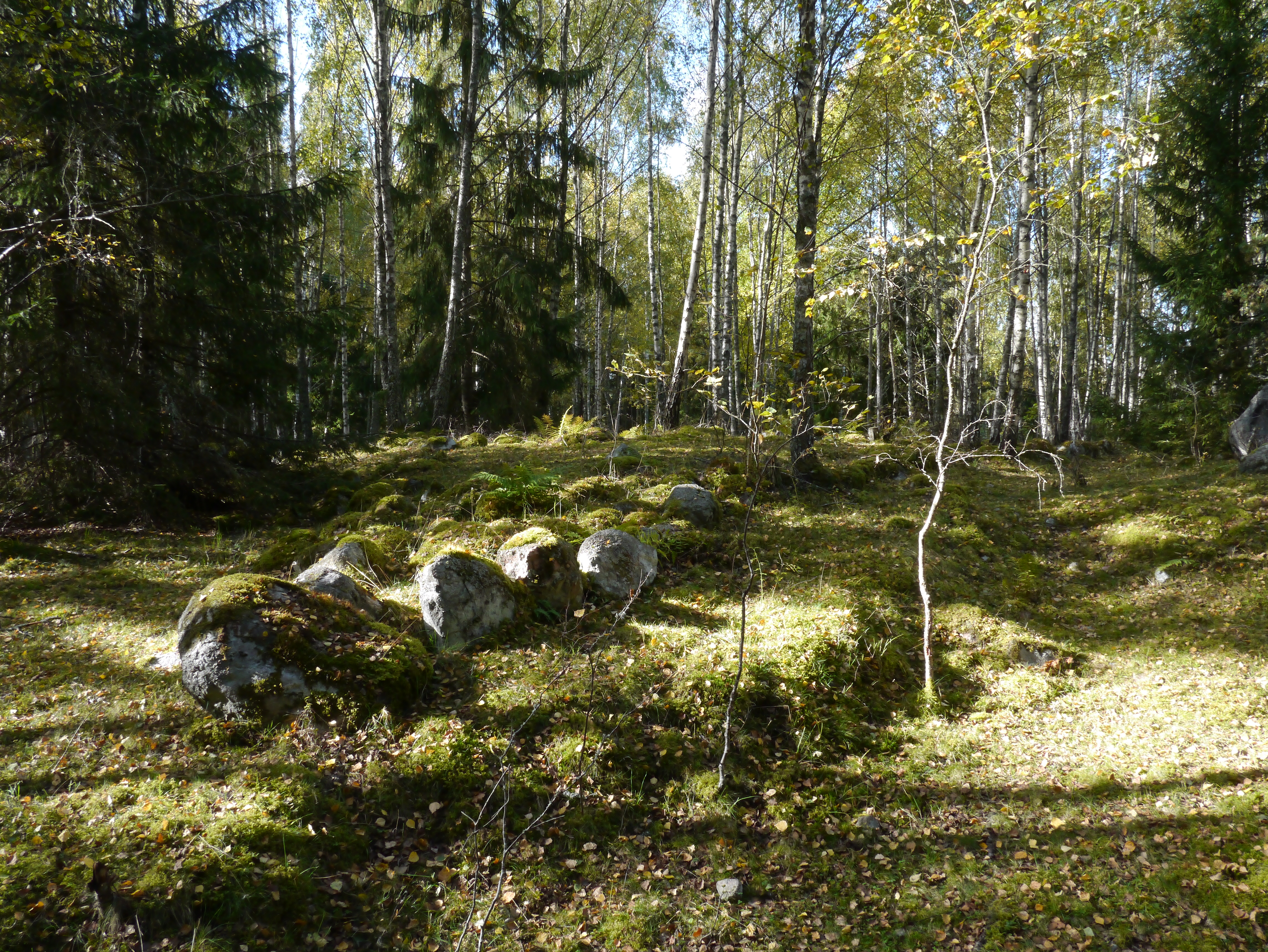
Stone boat in the cemetery at Kärrbacka, southeast of Björkö by.

The different types of graves on Björkö are not evenly distributed across the various sites. Cremation burials are concentrated mainly at Hemlanden and south of the fort, whereas inhumations and chamber graves are primarily located near the enclosure wall at Hemlanden and between the fort and the Black Earth area. The chronology of the burials also varies, with the oldest graves generally situated south of the fort and the most recent burials, dating to the 10th century, primarily found at Hemlanden.

The contents of graves on Björkö provide significant information about the religion, social status, and activities of the deceased. In inhumation burials, traces of clothing are often preserved. The garments found are primarily made of wool or linen, frequently fastened with bronze brooches. Some graves also contain fragments of silk, making Birka one of the Viking Age sites with the highest concentrations of silk in Scandinavia. Grave goods frequently reflect the status or profession of the individual. This is particularly evident in chamber graves, which constitute about 10% of the excavated graves but account for over half of the total value of the objects recovered. These graves often contain weapons, jewelry, and other luxury items, and in some cases, horses were interred alongside the deceased. In chamber grave Bj 581, genetic analysis conducted in 2017 confirmed that the skeleton was female, providing evidence that high-ranking Viking women could be buried with military equipment. The grave had previously been examined by Hjalmar Stolpe; although the skeleton exhibited a feminine physique, the presence of weapons and objects associated with military strategy had led earlier researchers to assume the individual was male.

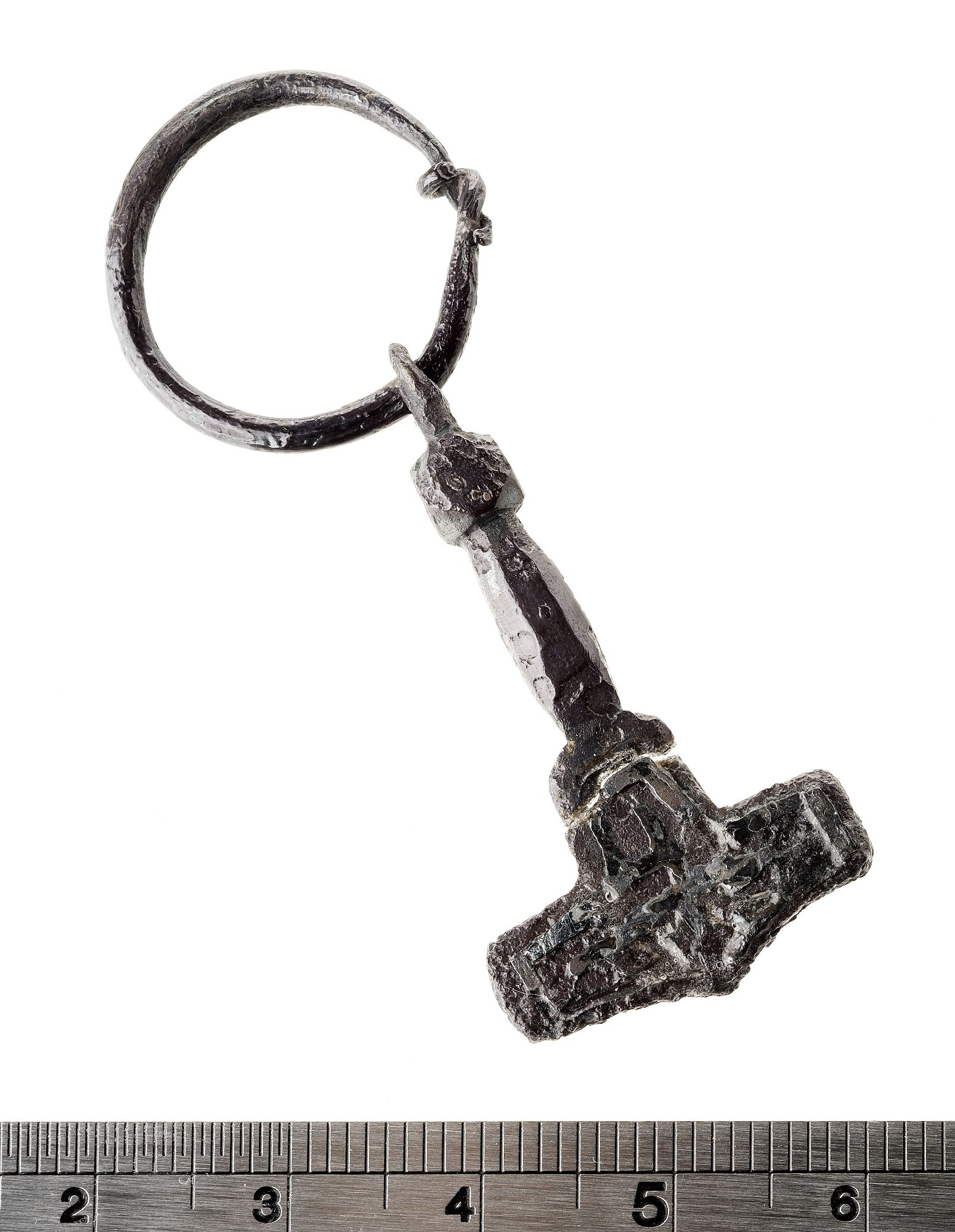
Mjöllnir pendant found in a chamber tomb in Hemlanden.

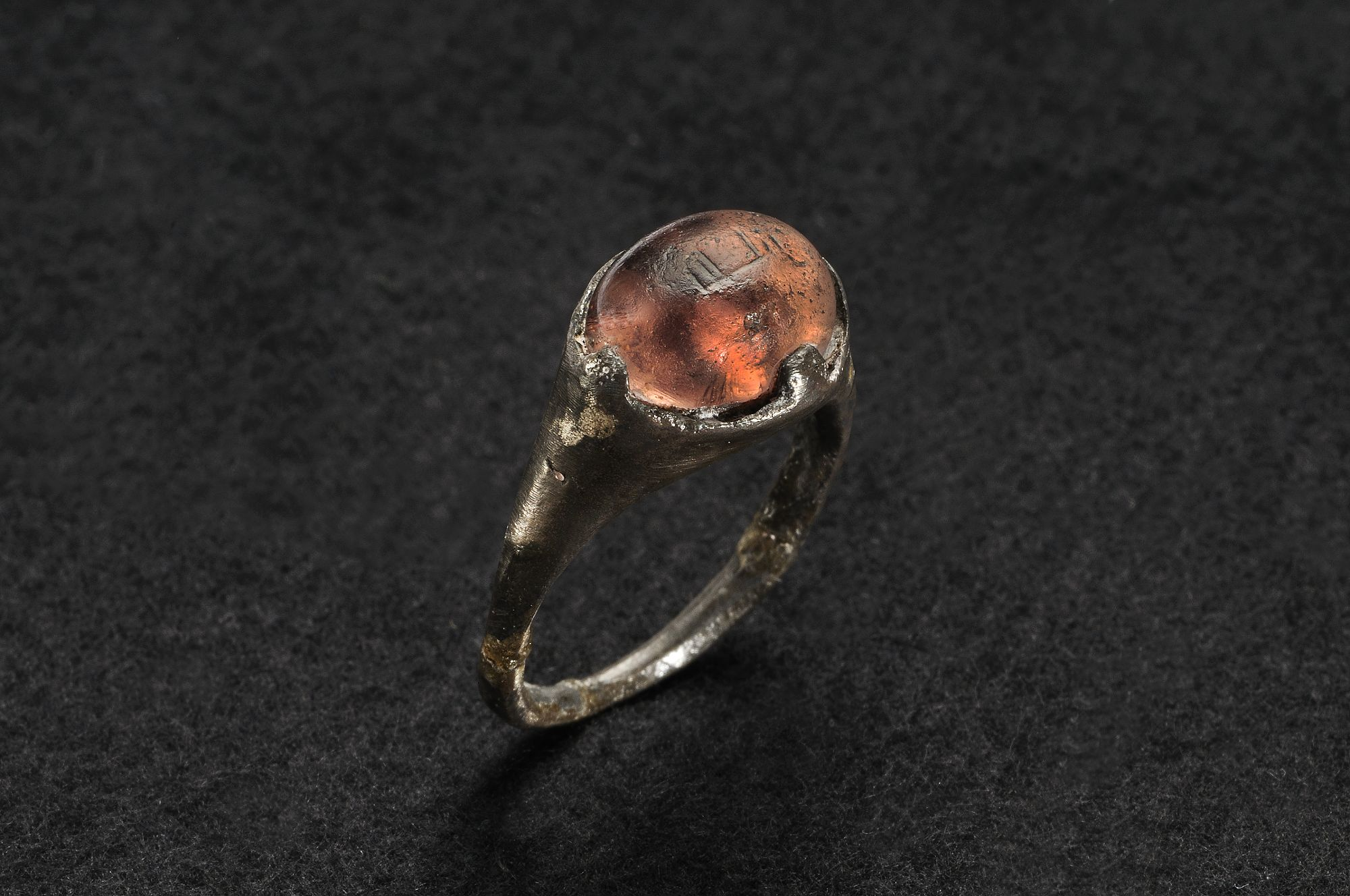
Ring with a Kufic inscription meaning “Allah,” found in a tomb north of the Fort, showing Birka's contacts with Muslim civilization.

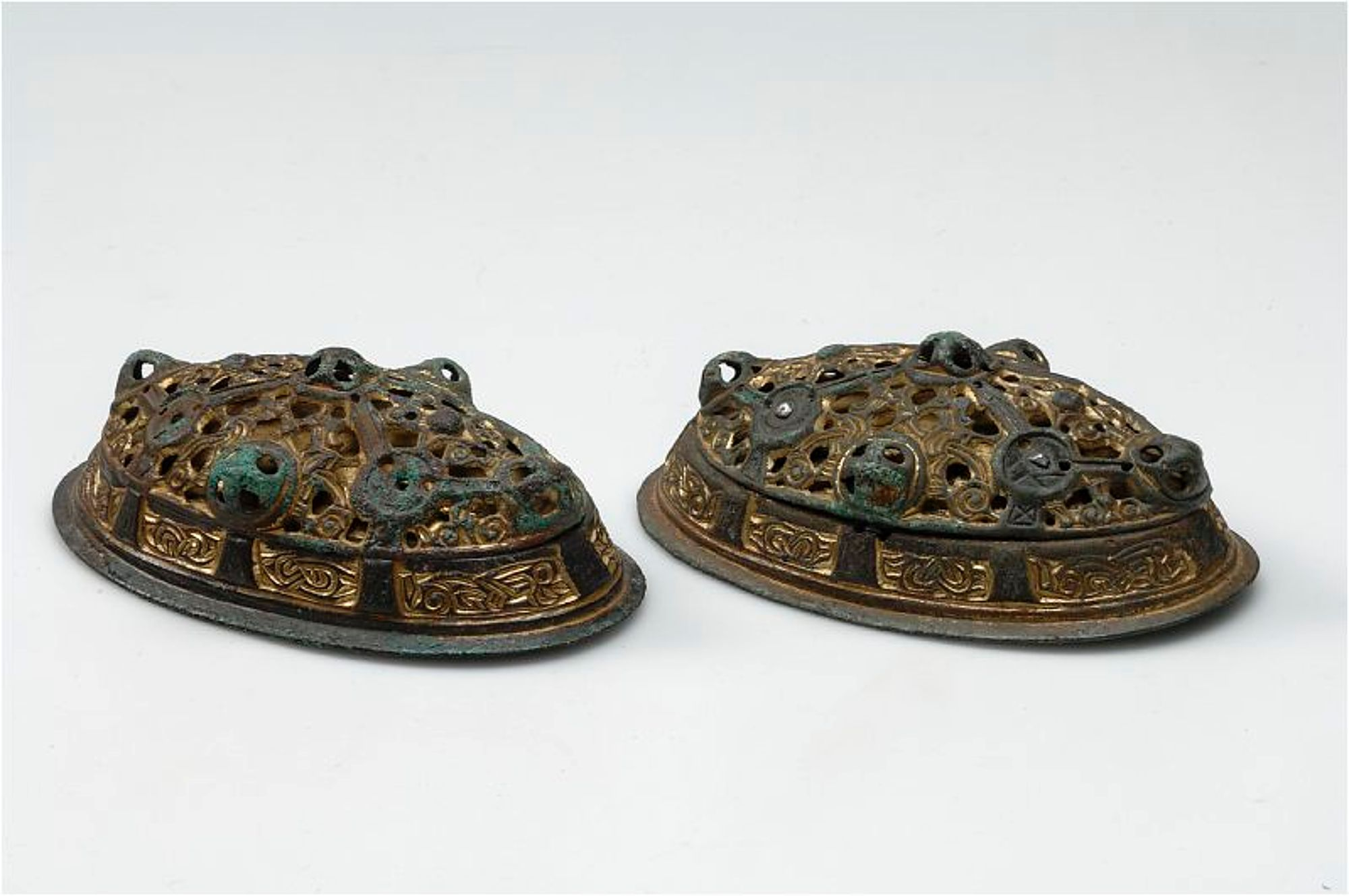
Turtle brooches, found in a grave in Hemlanden.

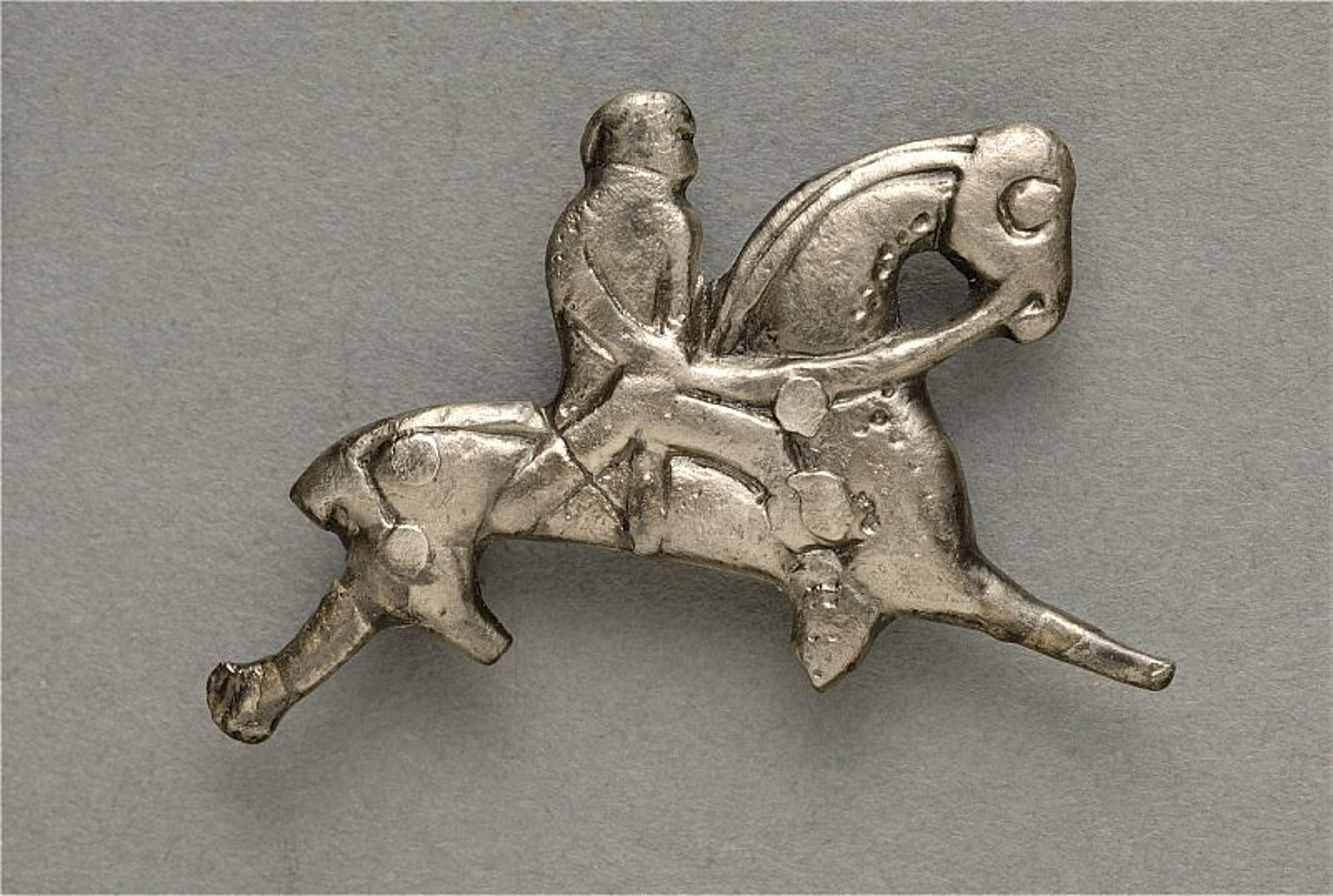
Silver clothing fasteners in the shape of a rider found in a chamber grave under the wall of Birka.

=== Hovgården ===
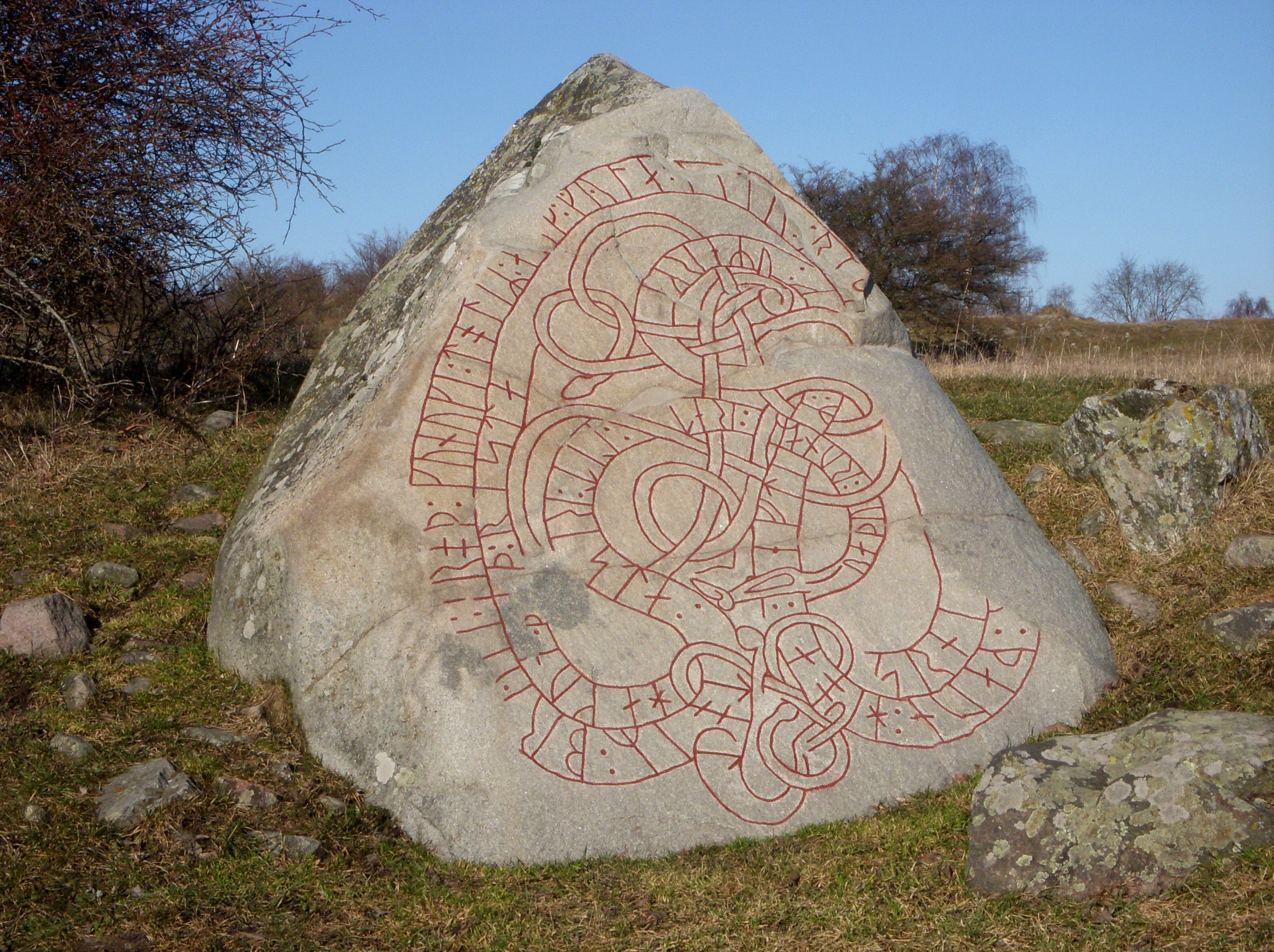
Hovgården runestone. This stone was badly damaged, the original paint had disappeared, and the inscriptions were barely visible. Red paint was added for visibility.

Unlike Birka, which retained much of its Viking Age features due to its abandonment in the tenth century, Hovgården continued to be occupied during the Middle Ages. Archaeological research at Hovgården has been relatively limited, with three main excavation campaigns conducted in 1916–1920, 1966, and 1992–1994.

The history of Hovgården spans several centuries. The oldest remains consist of a group of graves to the northwest, some dating back to the twelfth century, indicating occupation prior to the foundation of Birka. The site underwent a significant transformation in the eighth century, becoming a center of regional royal authority. The most prominent Viking Age features are the large burial mounds located north of the church. Three of these, known as the “royal mounds” (kungshögar), resemble those at Gamla Uppsala, with the largest measuring approximately 45 meters in diameter and 5 to 6 meters in height. These mounds are traditionally considered to be the graves of Birka’s kings; however, their construction dates are uncertain, and some historians suggest they may be older. Slightly west of these is another large, flatter mound, approximately 25 meters in diameter, believed to have been the site of the local assembly (Thing), hence its designation as the “assembly mound” (tingshög). Further north is the Skopintull mound, the only mound at Hovgården to have been scientifically analyzed, in 1917. It has been dated to the early tenth century and contained the cremated remains of a man and a woman in a boat, accompanied by several animals, including dogs and horses, as well as numerous valuable objects, indicating high social status and considerable wealth.

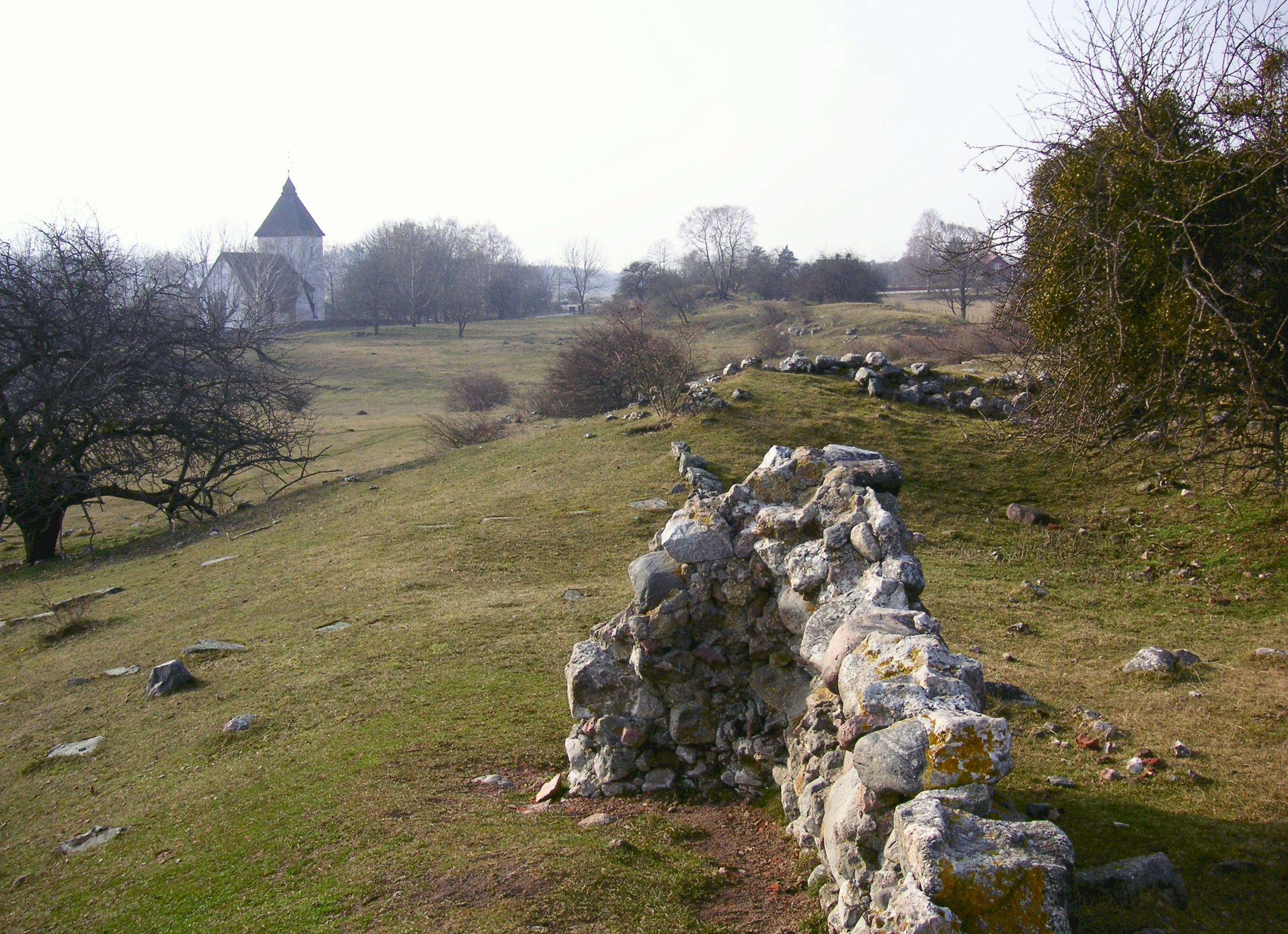
The ruins of Alsnö Hus in the foreground, with Adelsö Church in the background.

As Hovgården is assumed to have been the royal estate associated with Birka, a significant portion of archaeological research focused on identifying the remains of the royal residence from the Viking Age. Excavations conducted between 1991 and 1994 revealed traces of a Viking building immediately east of, and partially overlain by, the ruins of Alsnö Hus. The structure displays notable similarities with the great hall of the Garrison and was situated on a small hill overlooking the bay, providing a direct view of Birka. Between the church and Alsnö Hus, a depression that formed a bay during the Viking Age was also investigated. Excavations indicated that this area functioned as the Viking harbor, featuring a stone quay approximately 30 to 40 meters in length on its eastern side and a nearby building interpreted as a workshop, potentially used by a goldsmith. In proximity to the harbor stands the Hovgården runestone, dated to the 1070s, which references a king and has been interpreted as evidence that the royal residence continued to be in use following the abandonment of Birka.

Most of the structures visible at the site today date from the Middle Ages. These include the church of Adelsö, dating from the twelfth century, and the remains of the palace of Alsnö Hus, dating from the thirteenth century. The palace was a rectangular building measuring 30 × 13.5 meters, with a partially subterranean stone level and an above-ground portion constructed of brick. The above-ground structure likely had two stories: the ground floor contained a kitchen and an additional room, while the upper floor was a large hall, probably used for receiving guests. Remains of two smaller buildings were also found near the palace, one likely contemporary with it and the other somewhat older. The site of the medieval harbor was identified just downstream from the Viking-age harbor, and it still forms a bay.

== Management and protection ==
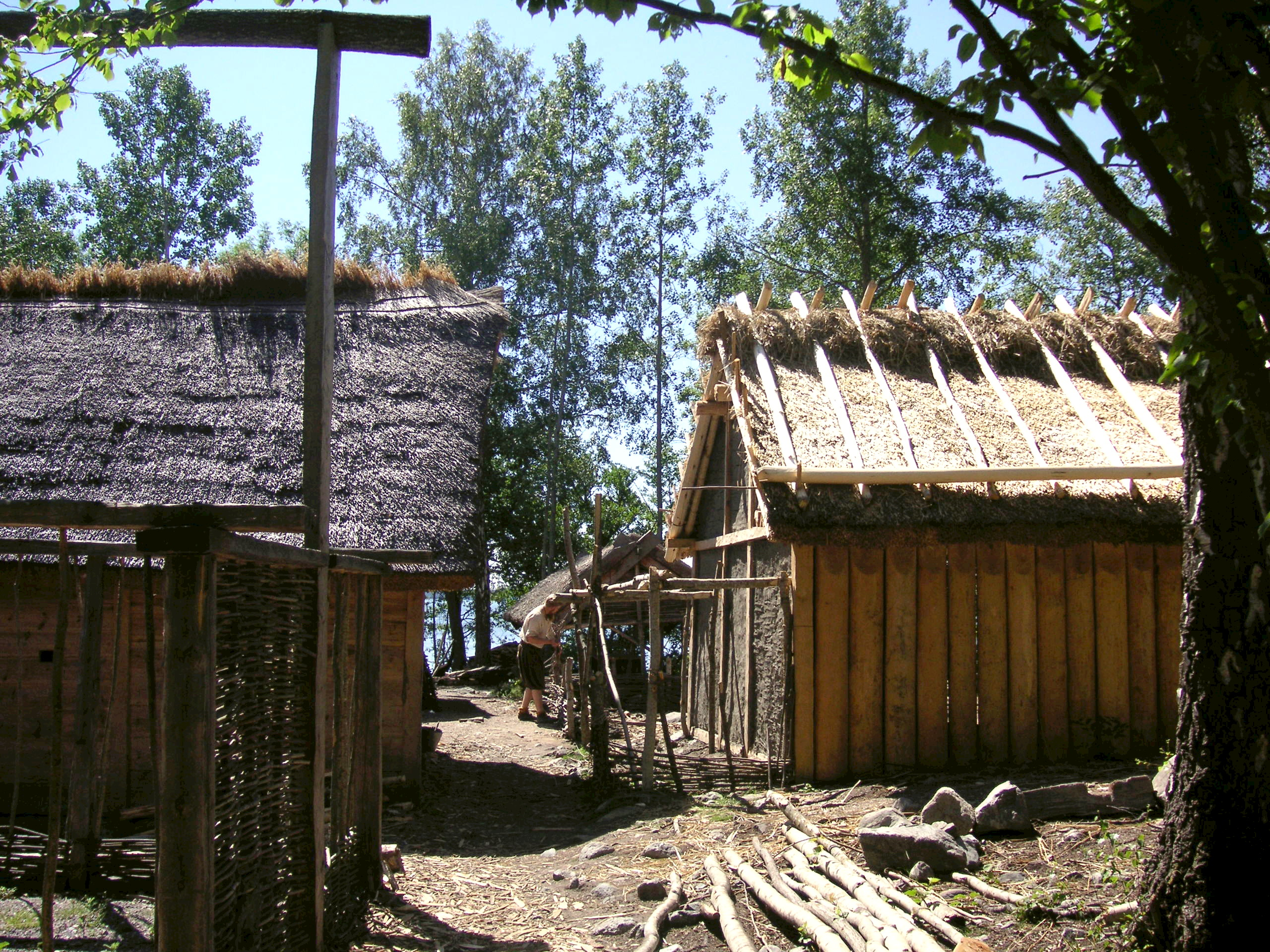
Some reconstructions of Viking houses in Birka.

The archaeological site of Birka was acquired by the Swedish state between 1912 and 1914 through the Royal Swedish Academy of Sciences. At the end of the 1920s, management of the site was transferred to the Royal Swedish Academy of Letters, History and Antiquities, a branch of the Swedish National Heritage Board. Since 2015, Birka and Hovgården have been administered by the Swedish State Property Board (Statens fastighetsverk). Site protection is overseen by a council (förvaltningsråd) comprising representatives from Statens fastighetsverk, Stockholm County administrative board, and the municipality of Ekerö. The council prepares a plan every six years setting out the main guidelines and objectives for the protection and management of the site.

The site is organized into several management zones to facilitate its administration. The entrance zone encompasses the outskirts of Hovgården and the Ångholmen peninsula, which was below sea level during the Viking Age and thus of limited archaeological value. This area includes the Birka museum and reconstructions of Viking houses, with a primary focus on accommodating visitors; construction regulations in this zone are relatively flexible. The central zone covers most of the archaeological sites at Hovgården and the area around the fort of Birka. This zone contains key archaeological features and receives the highest concentration of visitors, making it the area most vulnerable to damage. Management in this zone emphasizes visitor guidance and heritage preservation. The remainder of the site is divided into an intermediate zone and an outer zone, corresponding to areas with progressively fewer visitors, the outer zone being largely remote from tourist activity. The designation of Birka and Hovgården as a World Heritage Site also establishes a buffer zone, which includes the remainder of Björkö and a substantial central portion of Adelsö.

The site of Birka and Hovgården encompasses both cultural and natural heritage. It includes a small nature reserve located south of Grönsö, within the buffer zone, as well as several protected sections of coastline.

== Tourism ==
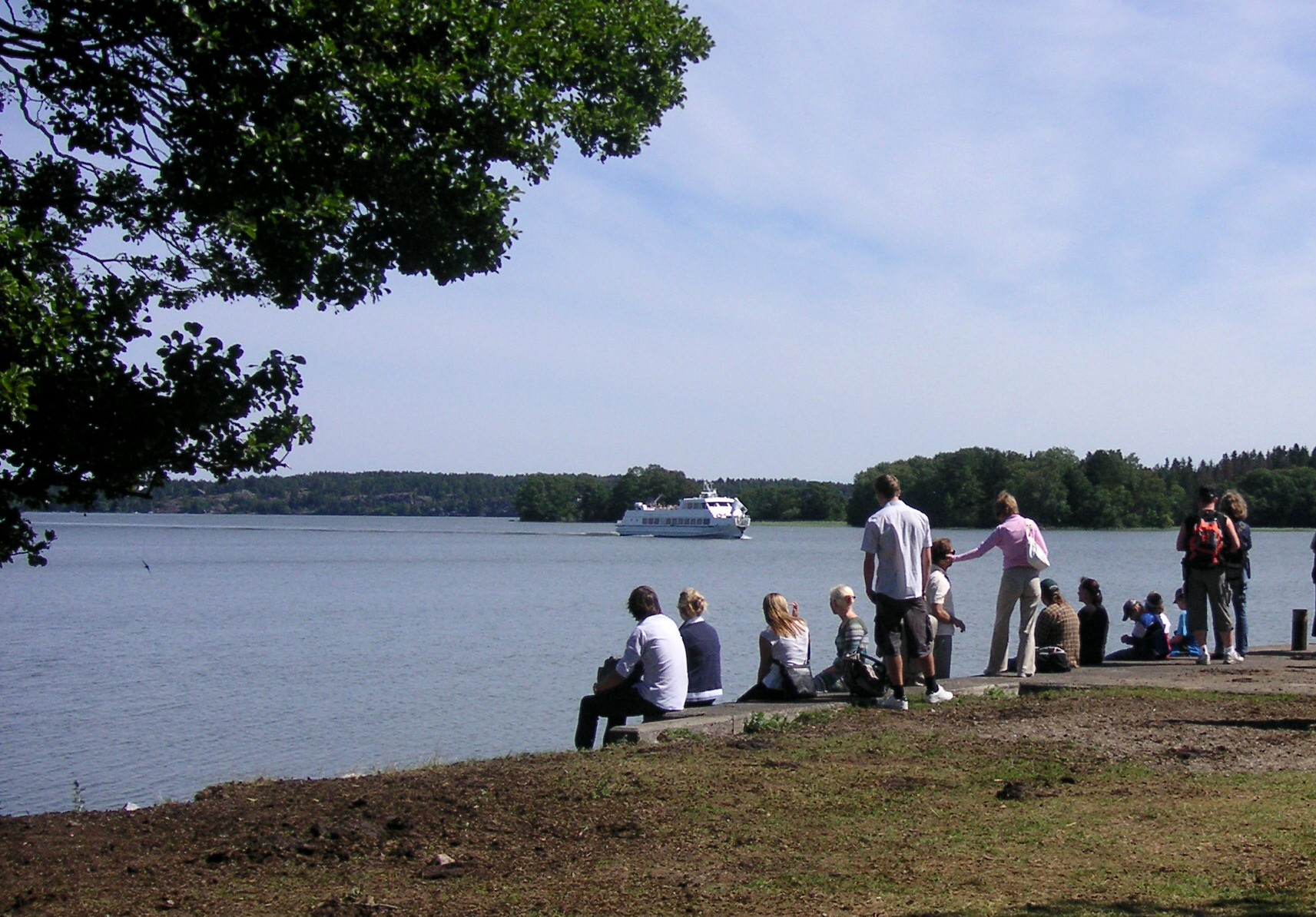
Tourists waiting for the boat at the Hovgården pier.

Birka and Hovgården constitute a notable tourist destination, attracting approximately 60,000 to 70,000 visitors annually. The majority of visitors are Swedish, while around 30% come from other countries, particularly Germany, the United Kingdom, the United States, and Italy. Birka is accessible by private boat, as the island has a small marina, and seasonally through companies offering regular tours from ports on Lake Mälar, including Strömma Kanalbolaget, which connects Birka to Stockholm in approximately two hours. Hovgården can be reached by car and bus via a ferry between the islands of Munsö and Adelsö, and Birka can be reached from Hovgården in around 15 minutes by boat operated by Strömma.

Most of Birka’s tourist infrastructure is located on the Ångholmen peninsula, in a complex known as Birka vikingastaden (“Birka, the Viking city”), managed by Strömma Turism & Sjöfart since 2007. Until 2015, Strömma collaborated closely with the National Heritage Board: the company leased the premises and managed infrastructure and visitor organization, while the National Heritage Board trained guides, who are all archaeologists, and employed the museum staff. This collaboration continues under Statens fastighetsverk. The facilities include the Birka museum, built in 1996 by the National Heritage Board and designed entirely in wood by architect Gunnar Mattsson. The museum contains a model representing Birka during the Viking Age and a selection of objects from excavations or replicas, with the majority of artifacts retained at the Historical Museum of Stockholm. Nearby is the Viking village, a reconstruction of several buildings built using period techniques. Construction began in 2006, with major development between 2007 and 2009 through a collaboration between Strömma and the University of Gotland. The peninsula also includes a café and a restaurant. During the tourist season, particularly in summer, events are organized on site, including battle reenactments, simulated archaeological excavations, and activities in the Viking village featuring artisans in period costume.

Hovgården, which receives fewer visitors, is also accessible through guided tours and includes a café and several craft shops.

== See also ==
- Proto-cities in the region during the Vendel or Viking period: Helgö, Gamla Uppsala, Signhildsberg
- Other proto-cities of the Viking Age: Hedeby, Dorestad, Ribe, Staraya Ladoga, York, Skiringssal, and Uppåkra
- Christianization of Scandinavia
- Volga trade route

== Bibliography ==
- Ambrosiani, Björn (1995). Birka (in Swedish). Uddevalla. ISBN 978-91-7209-659-2.
- Olausson, Lena Holmquist (2002). "Patterns of settlement and defence at the Proto-town of Birka, Lake Mälar, Eastern Sweden". The Scandinavians from the Vendel Period to the Tenth Century : An Ethnographic Perspective. Woodbridge: Judith Jesch. ISBN 0851158676.
- Peterson, Gary Dean (2016). Vikings and Goths : A History of Ancient and Medieval Sweden. McFarland & Company. ISBN 978-1-4766-6218-3.
