= Malmfälten =

Area of Sweden known for mining industry

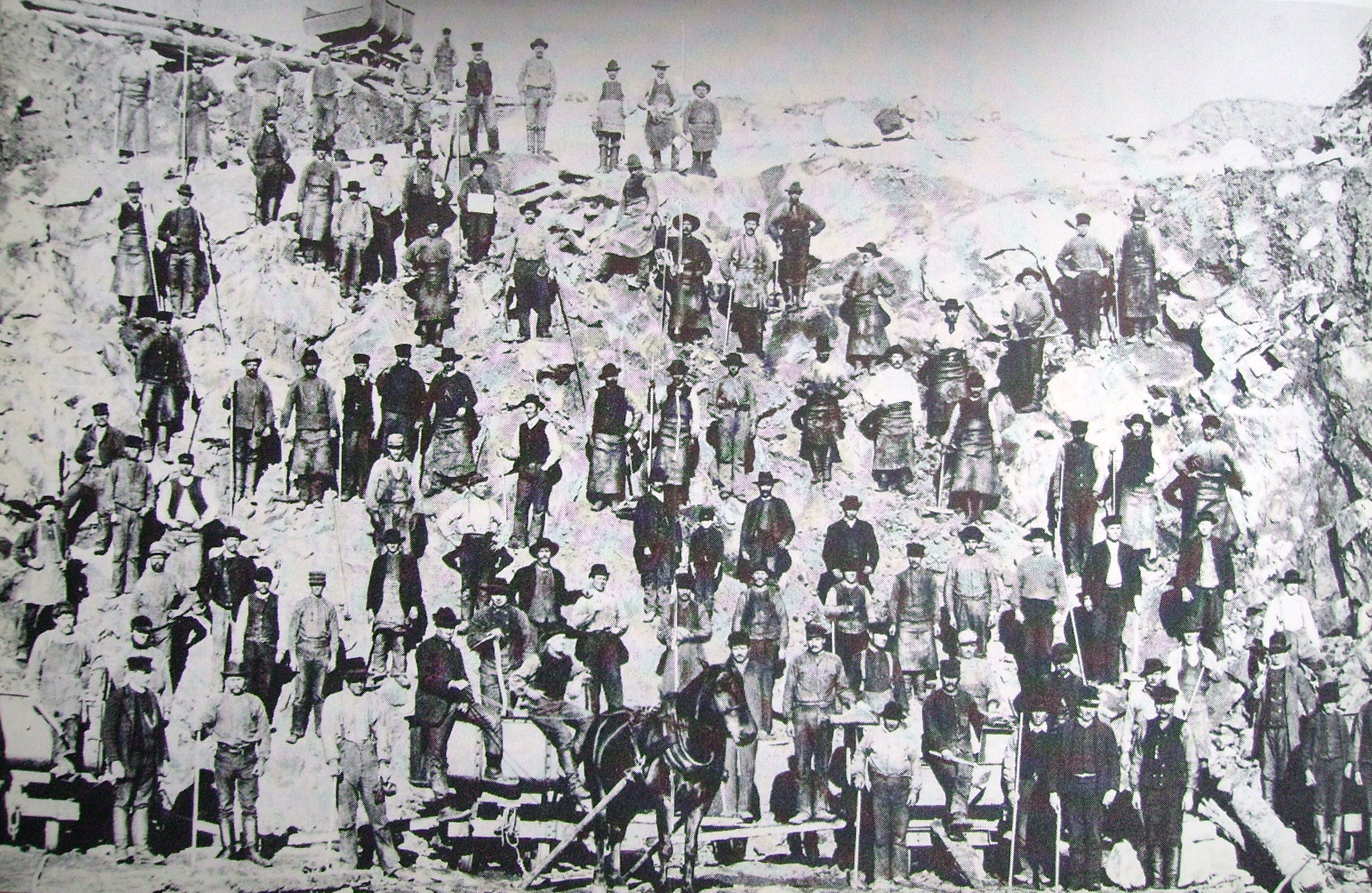
Picture of workers at Malmberget in Sweden, 1890s

Malmfälten (Swedish: the Ore Fields) is a major mining district in Sweden, centred on the northern towns of Kiruna and Malmberget.

Swedish state-owned mining company LKAB mines iron ore at Malmberget.

== See also ==
- LKAB
- Bergslagen
- Boliden
- Iron Range in Minnesota
