= Birgitta Ingvaldsdotter =

Swedish merchant

Birgitta Ingvaldsdotter (1468 – after 1527) was a Swedish merchant who through marriage, inheritance and enterprise become significantly wealthy.

== Life ==
She was the only child and heiress of the rich Stockholm merchant Ingvald Torstensson (d. 1505) and Anna Jakobsdotter (d. 1491).

=== First marriage ===
She married thrice; in 1490 to the merchant Anders Svensson Hellsing (d. 1503), in 1504 to merchant in Stockholm Gert Brüning (d. 1518), and in 1522 to merchant Hans Nagel.

On the occasion of her first wedding her uncle (Anna’s brother – who had joined the Dominican order) gave her half of his inheritance. She then inherited a significant amount when her mother died in 1491. When her father in law (Sven Hellsing) died she and her husband inherited all of his wealth and property.

When her first husband died in 1503, she inherited a substantial amount as a result of an agreement they had that ensured each inherited from the other. When her father died in 1505 she again secured a substantial inheritance.

=== Second and third marriage ===
She married her Gert Bruning, a wealthy German merchant, in 1504. As a result of their marriage he become a burgher of Stockholm. From 1505 onwards he was the highest taxpayer in Stockholm. Their business included exporting copper from Bergslagen (in south-central Sweden) to Lubeck and importing hops, saltpeter and cloth from Lubeck.

On the death of Gert Bruning, Birgitta managed the business herself and was the highest Stockholm taxpayer from 1518 to 1522.

She had inherited wealth from him as a result of an agreement that ensured the survivor benefitted at the expense of the deceased’s relatives. Her third husband, Hans Nagel, was also a German merchant.

=== Businesswoman ===
Birgitta Ingvaldsdotter managed the business of her husbands in her own name as a widow in 1503–1504 and 1518–1522, as well as during the illness of her first spouse in 1502–1503. But she was evidently active as the business partner of her husbands also during their lifetime, for example when they were away on business. It is explicitly stated that it was she who personally handled the important business transactions with the iron and copper producers in Bergslagen, whose products belonged to the most valuable things exported from Sweden to Lübeck by the family trading house. She belonged to the Swedish merchant elite of her time: in 1518–1522, she was one of the biggest taxpayers in Sweden.

She lived through a time when there was frequent violence between two competing factions in Sweden, those who - with the support of the Danish army - favoured union with Denmark and those who favoured Swedish independence. Stockholm was besieged and blockaded and in 1520, a number of nobles and burghers were executed in the Stockholm bloodbath. Swedish independence was finally declared in June 1523 and Gustav Vasa declared king. That started the process of the Reformation in Sweden, which included an Act of Parliament in 1527 that allowed the confiscation of clerical assets.

Birgitta had previously donated the rental income from some property to the Franciscan order (to maintain a priest who said a requiem mass for the family) and the St Nicolai Guild (to maintain a priest to collect money for poor relief). In 1527, she made use of the new law introduced during the Swedish Reformation which proscribed these types of donations to the Catholic church. She succeeded in recovering that income for herself, rather than it going to the Crown.

The date of her death is unknown.
