= Bergslagen =

Region in northern Svealand, Sweden

Coordinates: 59°50′N 15°45′E

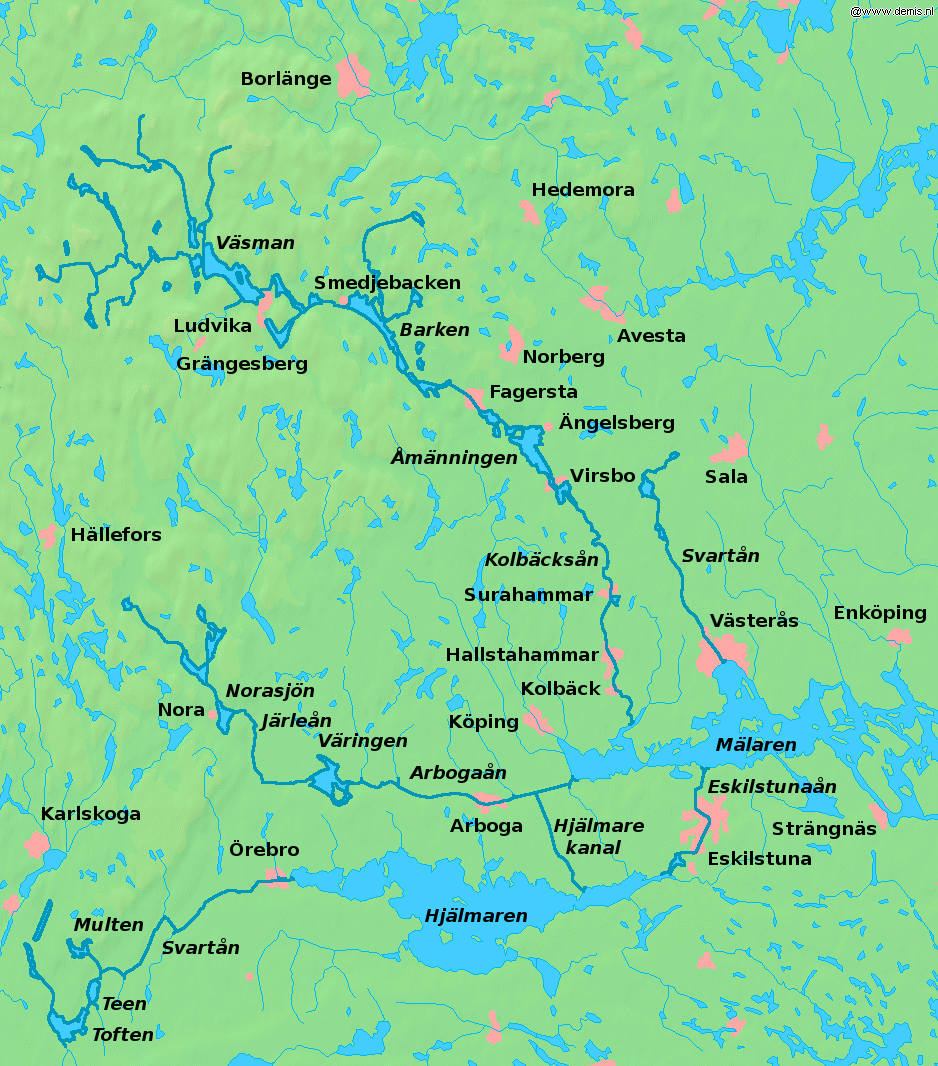
Map of Bergslagen

Bergslagen is a historical, cultural, and linguistic region located north of Lake Mälaren in northern Svealand, Sweden, traditionally known as a mining district. In Bergslagen, the mining and metallurgic industries have been important since the Middle Ages although Malmfälten ("the Ore Fields"), the mining district of northernmost Sweden centred at the towns of Kiruna and Malmberget, has been of greater importance during the 20th century.

Bergslagen is not precisely defined, but generally understood to cover part of the provinces of Västmanland, Dalarna (the southern part), and Värmland (the eastern part). Typical towns in the area include Lindesberg, Nora, Fagersta, Sala, Kristinehamn, Filipstad, Grythyttan, Ludvika and Hedemora. Also parts of northern Östergötland, around Finspång, as well as southern Närke can be included, then often referring to South Bergslagen. A wider definition of the area can include parts of Gästrikland (Hofors) and Uppland (the former iron manufacturing district centred on Dannemora) as well.

== History ==
The conflict of interests between iron exports from Bergslagen and territorial conflicts at Denmark's southern border was a chief reason behind the Engelbrekt rebellion in 1434 and the following strife that ultimately resulted in the dissolution of the Kalmar Union in 1523.

Exports from Bergslagen were a source of wealth for Swedish merchants such as Birgitta Ingvaldsdotter who traded in the early part of the 16th century.

The region was an industrial powerhouse from the 17th century, up to the Steel crisis during the 1970s.

== Minerals and mining ==
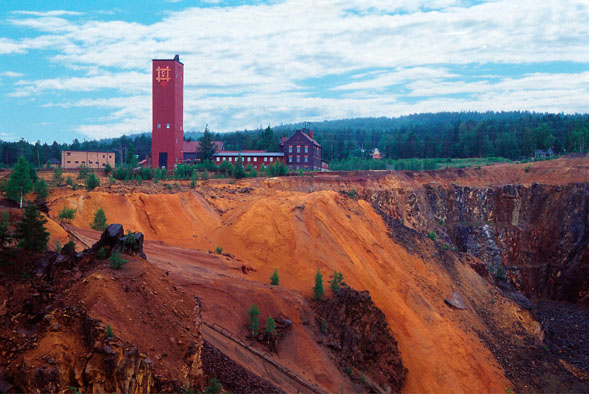
Stora stöten (the Great Pit) Falun

The area is very rich in minerals. Mining has been focused on iron ore for centuries but other ores have been mined as well. Most mines are now closed, but in the 1970s many mines were still in operation. The earliest signs of iron making date back to 400 BC while industrial-scale activities date back to the 17th century.

At Långban, where iron and manganese have been mined, 270 mineral species have been reported to date. Many of these minerals are unique to the Långban deposit, and 67 minerals were first found at this site.

== See also ==
- Ecomuseum Bergslagen
- Falu red
- Roslagen
- Mälaren Valley
