= 1864 (TV series) =

2014 Danish television historical drama series

- Genre: War drama
- Created by: Ole Bornedal
- Written by: Ole Bornedal
- Directed by: Ole Bornedal
- Starring: Pilou Asbæk; Jakob Oftebro; Marie Tourell Søderberg; Sidse Babett Knudsen; Søren Malling; Jens Sætter-Lassen; Nicolas Bro; Johannes Lassen; Sarah-Sofie Boussnina; Bent Mejding
- Composer: Marco Beltrami
- Country of origin: Denmark
- Original languages: Danish; German
- No. of seasons: 1
- No. of episodes: 8

Production
- Producers: Jonas Allen; Peter Bose
- Cinematography: Dan Laustsen
- Running time: 60 minutes

Original release
- Network: DR1
- Release: October 12 – November 30, 2014

1864 is a 2014 Danish television historical war drama series written and directed by Ole Bornedal. It is based on two books by Tom Buk-Swienty about the Second Schleswig War of 1864 between Denmark and an alliance of Prussia and Austria which ended in defeat for Denmark and the loss of a quarter of its territory to Prussia. It follows two brothers from a remote village on Funen who enlist in the Danish army just before the outbreak of war, and experience the horrors of combat in Schleswig. It also features actual historical figures such as Danish prime minister D. G. Monrad and Prussian prime minister Otto von Bismarck. It was the most expensive Danish TV series ever made at the time.

== Production ==
1864 was produced by Miso Film for DR. It was a co-production with Film Fyn, TV2 (Norway), TV4 (Sweden), SF Studios, ARTE, ZDF Enterprises and Sirena Film (Czech Republic). DR had recently produced the highly successful series The Killing, Borgen and The Bridge, and several of the stars of those series, such as Lars Mikkelsen, Sidse Babett Knudsen and Søren Malling, were among the cast. 1864 was filmed on location at Dybbøl, scene of the climactic battle of the war, in the Svanninge Hills on Funen, and at Hagenskov, Egebjerggård and Hvidkilde Manors, also on Funen. The battle scenes were filmed in the Czech Republic over a period of seven weeks. Tom Buk-Swienty, on whose books the series was based, was a historical consultant on the series. It was the most expensive television series ever made in Denmark, with a projected cost of 173 million kroner (about $25 million).

The director, Ole Bornedal, described it as "a classic story about power and the abuse of power...of people getting separated." The BBC's John Wilson said it had "the sense of the epic in scale" but with "a great undertone of tragedy."

The background to the opening credits is the painting Fra forposterne 1864 (From the outposts, 1864) by Vilhelm Rosenstand.

== Plot summary ==
=== 1850s ===
In 1851, the people of a Danish village await the return of the victorious soldiers from the First Schleswig War. Among the soldiers is farmer Thøger Jensen, who has incurred a severe leg wound and returns to his wife Karen and sons 12-year-old Laust and 11-year-old Peter. Also returning is Didrich, son of the local landowner, the Baron, who served as a captain. Didrich has been severely damaged psychologically by the war and has also been tainted by cowardice; his father reveals that he bribed his fellow officers not to report him to the military authorities. Didrich's mother died giving birth to him, and his father (Waage Sandø) has never forgiven him; while kind to his tenants, he treats his son with scorn.

Overjoyed to have their father home, Laust and Peter also befriend Inge Juel, the spirited daughter of the Baron's new estate manager. Didrich, too, who is increasingly becoming a dissolute alcoholic, has feelings for Inge, although she is only a child. At the harvest festival celebrations he propositions her, but she slaps his face and runs away. Later, Thøger, whose wound has never really healed, dies suddenly while working in the fields. Laust goes to work for the Baron as a stable boy.

In Copenhagen, the leader of the National Liberal Party, D. G. Monrad, meets famous actress Johanne Luise Heiberg, who begins to encourage him in his nationalist ideas.

=== 1860s ===
In the 1860s, Monrad is now Council President (prime minister), and has become a convinced nationalist. He actively tries to provoke a war with Prussia over the Schleswig-Holstein Question, still encouraged by Mrs Heiberg. Monrad tries to persuade the new king, Christian IX, that declaring war would show the people that Christian, who was born in Schleswig and grew up speaking German, is a true Dane. In Berlin, King Wilhelm, his minister-president, Otto von Bismarck, and his chief of the general staff, General Helmuth von Moltke, greet Denmark's sabre-rattling with disbelief but also relief as such a war would fit perfectly into Bismarck's plan of placing Prussia as the dominant power in the German Confederation.

In the village, Laust and Peter have grown into young men, now both in love with Inge. A group of gypsies led by Ignazio arrives in the village and ask for work. Although Inge's father says they need help with the harvest, Didrich orders them to leave. Later, he and his dissolute friends catch Ignazio's son, Djargo, poaching pheasant on the Baron's land and severely flog him. He is found by Laust, Peter and Inge, who take him to the Baron. The Baron chastises his son and gives the gypsies work in the harvest. He also persuades Laust and Peter and their friend Einar to join the army.

The brothers complete their basic training and return to the village on leave, arriving at the harvest festival celebrations. They leave with Inge and both end up kissing her. However, after they leave her, Laust, on the pretext of going to search for his lost knife, returns to her without Peter's knowledge and they make love. Later, Didrich, drunk as usual and unable to find Inge, rapes Ignazio's beautiful, mute daughter Sofia, who keeps the attack to herself.

The brothers return to the army, where they and Einar are assigned to a company of the 8th Brigade. There they befriend Alfred, a naive young man from Skagen, Erasmus, a cheerful bearded giant who is a miller in civilian life, and Johan Larsen, a middle-aged veteran who has a reputation for being psychic and is soon promoted to corporal. They also form good relations with the company's second-in-command, the young Second Lieutenant Wilhelm Dinesen, and with their senior NCO, Sergeant Jespersen.

Monrad's plans are finally realised when he announces that Denmark has fully annexed Schleswig and Prussia decides to declare war. The 8th Brigade is sent south to occupy the Danevirke, a line of fortifications which has always been regarded as the country's southern border and which is regarded in Danish mythology as impregnable. However, when they arrive they find the Danevirke dilapidated, with no barracks accommodation. They are also assigned a new company commander to replace the former ancient and senile officer, who has died en route; it is Didrich, who has been recalled to the colours.

The company is ordered to Mysunde, where they witness the devastation of the Battle of Mysunde, the first battle of the war giving the Danes an early victory, although Didrich keeps them well behind the action. Laust and Peter have both been writing to Inge and she to them, but she and Laust have also been exchanging further secret letters. Peter receives one of these by mistake and realises that his brother has slept with Inge. Devastated, he disowns Laust. Didrich later promotes Johan to sergeant and Laust to corporal.

It becomes obvious to the Danish commander, General Christian de Meza, that he cannot hold the Danevirke because the marshes and water on which he had relied to defend its flanks have been frozen solid by the hard winter, and he asks for permission to withdraw to Dybbøl, but Monrad refuses. De Meza withdraws anyway and is replaced by the unimaginative General Georg Gerlach, who is guaranteed to do anything he is told to do. Peter, Einar and Jespersen are among a small party led by Dinesen who volunteer to remain behind at the Danevirke to spike the guns after the Danish withdrawal. They escape just before the Prussian Army arrives, but are then pursued and captured by a small unit of Totenkopf hussars. Under orders from their hideously disfigured officer, the hussar unit executes one Dane before Dinesen, who has managed to escape, reappears and surprises them; caught off guard, all the hussars are killed by the Danish POWs, an event that traumatizes Peter for the remainder of his life. Dinesen gains a reputation for ferocity and invincibility.

Meanwhile, during the retreat to Dybbøl, Didrich orders Laust to jump into a frozen pond to retrieve a cannon that has fallen in. After his friends pull him out he develops severe hypothermia and he and his friends, including Johan, Alfred and Erasmus, begin to fall further behind the column. They thereby miss the Battle of Sankelmark, although they come upon the bloody aftermath.

Back in the village, Inge realises she is pregnant by Laust. Her mother disowns her and she leaves with the gypsies when they head south to see whether they can make any profit from the war. During the journey she and Djargo realise Sofia too is pregnant and Djargo swears to kill Didrich, whom he correctly surmises has raped his sister. They reach Dybbøl, where Inge encounters Didrich, who tells her that both brothers are dead.

The Danish army digs in at Dybbøl. Both Laust's and Peter's groups arrive, although they do not encounter one another. Laust, now dying from pneumonia, is taken to a military hospital where Inge and Sofia are working as nurses, although they do not meet. Djargo disguises himself as a soldier to try to kill Didrich, but is caught. Didrich wants him executed, but Jespersen persuades him that this would be a crime and he instead has him locked in a dugout. Dinesen leads his group in a nighttime raid to kill the German bandsmen who have been playing marches near the Danish lines. Celebrating after the successful raid, Alfred, who has joined the group, has too much to drink and climbs onto the parapet, where he has both hands blown off by an exploding shell. He later dies of blood loss in a hospital, where Inge and Peter pass next to each other but do not notice the other. Johan mysteriously manages to cure Laust of his pneumonia and he returns to the company.

Finally, the Prussians attack, beginning with a remorseless six-hour artillery barrage. They are now commanded by the highly competent Prince Friedrich Karl, the Prussian king's nephew, who has replaced the 80-year-old and increasingly senile Field Marshal von Wrangel. Most of Didrich's company are holding the trenches, although Dinesen's men are with the main body of the brigade who are forming a reserve behind the lines. The Prussian infantry attack and Erasmus is killed. Djargo, who has escaped during the barrage, finds Didrich and stabs him in the thigh, but is killed by a stray bullet before he can finish off his sister's rapist. Didrich, terrified and cowering, tries to surrender to a group of Prussian soldiers, but they ignore him.

The 8th Brigade attacks, led by Dinesen after its commanding officer refuses to advance without orders from his superiors, and manages to push the Prussians back temporarily. A counterattack, however, destroys the brigade and kills Jespersen, and Peter, trapped behind enemy lines, finally realises that he has to find his brother. Meanwhile, Laust has discovered the wounded and frightened Didrich and begins carrying him to safety. However, he is spotted and shot dead by the Germans. Peter, arriving too late but witnessing his brother's death, falls into shock and is captured and confined to a prisoner of war hospital in Austria. Meanwhile, Inge gives birth as the battle rages. Realising his country is defeated, King Christian surrenders, although Monrad, abandoned by Mrs Heiberg, still tries to persuade him to continue fighting.

Johan infiltrates the Prussian lines the night after the battle and collects all the papers, letters and photographs from the bodies of his dead comrades. He then travels throughout Denmark handing them to their families. When he reaches Laust and Peter's village he tries to give Laust's last letter to Inge, who has been taken back in by her parents, but her mother Ingrid (Helle Fagralid) refuses to let him see her and later reads and burns the letter without giving it to her. The Baron asks Johan about Didrich, who is in a prisoner of war camp in Hamburg, and Johan bitterly tells him the truth: that his son is a coward and a deserter. As he leaves, the Baron shoots himself.

Later Didrich is released and returns to the village, to find himself the new Baron. He asks Inge to marry him, implying an estate manager's daughter would be a fool to refuse such an offer from a nobleman. Still believing both Laust and Peter to be dead, she accepts, although she becomes hysterical when her child, whom she has named Laust after his father, is taken from her; Didrich has made it clear that he does not want another man's bastard.

Two years later, Peter, now sane, fit and healthy once more, is finally released and works his way back across Austria and Prussia to Denmark, encountering en route Prussian troops now marching to fight their former allies, the Austrians. He returns to the village to find Sofia and her baby, whom she has named Peter after him, living with his mother. He goes to see Inge, who, pregnant with her and Didrich's first child, breaks down when she sees him and realises Didrich lied to her. Peter knocks a typically offensive Didrich down and leaves. He finds little Laust in the orphanage in which he has been abandoned and adopts him as his own son. He falls in love with and marries Sofia, who is now capable of at least limited speech, celebrating with his family and friends, including Einar, who has also survived the war. Monrad and his family make plans to leave for New Zealand. Inge's voiceover tells us that she and Didrich had a number of children, each of whom seemed to calm him a little more, although he was never truly normal.

=== 2014 ===
A frame story takes place in the modern day. Troubled teenage tearaway Claudia and her drug dealer boyfriend Zlatko are taken on a school trip to the Dybbøl battlefield, where they are bored and smoke marijuana. Soon afterwards Claudia, whose brother was killed while serving in the army overseas (probably in Afghanistan) and whose parents have retreated into depression, leaves school and is found a temporary job as carer for Baron Severin. In his nineties, nearly blind, reliant on a wheelchair and probably with dementia, Severin lives alone in his mansion, which it is soon clear is the same mansion formerly owned by Didrich. While looking for things to steal to finance her boyfriend's drug dealing, Claudia finds a handwritten journal, which turns out to be Inge's memoirs, written just before her death in 1939. Inge was Severin's grandmother and he asks Claudia to read it to him. She begins reluctantly, but soon warms to the story and to the old man, and it is this story, read by both Claudia and Inge, that forms the voiceover at various points in the series.

Later Claudia discovers that through her mother she is Sofia's great-great-great-great-granddaughter and that she and Severin are therefore distant cousins (presumably her great-great-great-grandfather was little Peter, who was Didrich's son, as was Severin's father). She tries to sell the jewellery she has stolen from Severin, but the jeweller becomes suspicious and calls the police and she flees back to the mansion. Tearfully she admits to Severin what she has done, but he says he knows and forgives her. As she reads the end of the story to him, she realises that he was with Inge at the end and wrote the whole thing down for her. Excitedly she asks him about it, but then realises that the old man has died as she was reading.

== Cast ==
Main cast members from the series:

- Esben Dalgaard Andersen as Erasmus
- Pilou Asbæk as Didrich
- Peter Benedict as Lieutenant-General Edwin von Manteuffel
- Rasmus Bjerg as Colonel Max Müller
- Sarah Boberg as Karen Jensen
- Rainer Bock as Minister President Otto von Bismarck
- Fanny Bornedal as Inge Juel (12 years old)
- Sarah-Sofie Boussnina as Claudia Henriksen
- Nicolas Bro as Bishop D. G. Monrad
- Zlatko Burić as Ignazio
- Sylvester Byder as Laust Jensen (12 years old)
- Heikko Deutschmann as Lieutenant-General Helmuth von Moltke
- Karel Dobrý as Major-General August von Goeben
- Helle Fagralid as Ingrid Juel
- Barbara Flynn as Queen Victoria
- James Fox as Lord Palmerston
- Peter Gilsfort as Inge's Father
- Jordan Haj as Djargo
- Kristian Halken as Major-General Georg Gerlach
- Stig Hoffmeyer as Hans Christian Andersen
- Olaf Johannessen as Carl Christian Hall
- Eva Josefíková as Sofia
- Sidse Babett Knudsen as Johanne Luise Heiberg
- Johannes Lassen as Wilhelm Dinesen
- Lars Lohmann as King Frederick VII of Denmark
- Jens Christian Buskov Lund as Alfred
- Søren Malling as Johan Larsen
- Bent Mejding as Baron Severin
- Barnaby Metschurat as General Prince Friedrich Karl
- Louise Mieritz as Emilie Lütthans
- Lars Mikkelsen as Thøger Jensen
- Dieter Montag as King Wilhelm of Prussia
- Benjamin Holmstrøm Nielsen as Peter Jensen (11 years old)
- Jakob Oftebro as Laust Jensen
- Søren Pilmark as Major E. A. Lundbye
- Peter Plaugborg as Sergeant Jespersen
- Henrik Prip as King Christian IX of Denmark
- Rainer Rainers as Johann Gottfried Piefke
- Hans-Michael Rehberg as Field Marshal Friedrich Graf von Wrangel
- Carl-Christian Riestra as Einar
- Adam Ild Rohweder as Lieutenant Viggo Monrad
- Waage Sandø as the Baron
- Jens Sætter-Lassen as Peter Jensen
- Søren Sætter-Lassen as General Christian de Meza
- Philip Schenker as Lieutenant-General Eduard Vogel von Falckenstein
- Roland Schreglmann as Ludwig
- Marie Tourell Søderberg as Inge Juel
- Jens Jørn Spottag as Major-General Glode du Plat
- Troels Malling Thaarup as Ernst Schau
- Ludwig Trepte as Heinz
- Besir Zeciri as Zlatko

== Broadcast ==
1864 was first broadcast on DR1 on 12 October 2014. It was broadcast in a four-week run on BBC Four in the United Kingdom, starting on 16 May 2015 with 2 episodes shown each week. The series premiered on Swedish commercial broadcaster TV4 and on the Franco-German network Arte in June 2015. It was shown on Irish public service broadcaster RTÉ2 in July 2015, and in Australia on SBS, commencing on 7 June 2016.

== Reception ==
The series divided reviewers in Denmark; some were enthusiastic, praising the lavish cinematography, while others considered the cost should have been used for other programming, especially more Scandinavian noir. Some Danish critics and historians felt that the series contained historical inaccuracies, particularly in its assertion that excessive nationalism drove Denmark into a war that was bound to end in defeat. The 1864 war had a profound effect on Denmark, setting the country's course for its modern development. As a result, Tom Buk-Swienty, the series' historical consultant, believed that that sort of debate was inevitable. On the other hand, producer Peter Bose commented that "we were expecting debates but were rather surprised by the continuous bashing".

It received a positive reception from reviewers in the United Kingdom, however. Andrew Collins of The Guardian said that "1864 really is in television's top rank", and that "the most expensive TV series in Danish history puts every krone up there on the screen." Gerard O'Donovan of the Telegraph said that DR had "taken a key moment in their nation's history and made it as compelling as any noir drama." Ellen E. Jones of the Independent said that "the scale of this series is too ambitious to grasp in a single episode, but the more you watch, the deeper you'll be sucked in."
