= Second Schleswig War =

War between Denmark, Prussia, and Austria in 1864

- Part of the unification of Germany
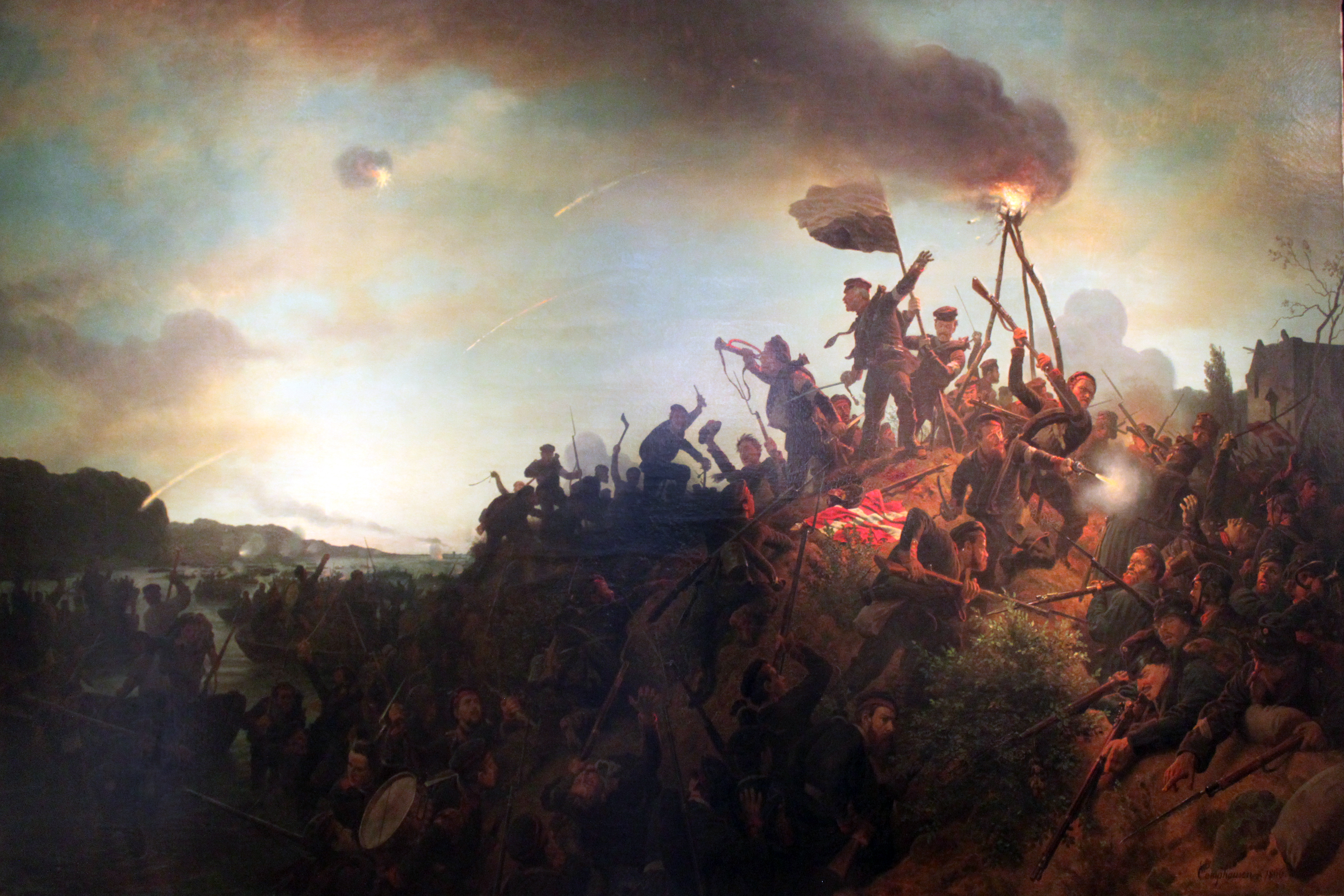
- Battle of Als, 29 June
Date	1 February – 30 October 1864 (8 months and 29 days)
Location	Schleswig and Jutland; Pre-war actions in Holstein and Lauenburg
Result	Austro-Prussian victory
Territorial changes	Denmark loses Schleswig, Holstein and Lauenburg

Belligerents
Prussia; Austria	Denmark

Commanders and leaders
(Kingdom of Prussia) Otto von Bismarck; (Kingdom of Prussia) Friedrich Graf von Wrangel	(Denmark) Christian IX; (Denmark) Christian Julius de Meza

Strength
At the outbreak of war: 61,000 soldiers; 158 guns; Later reinforcements: 20,000 soldiers; 64 guns	38,000 soldiers 100+ guns

Casualties and losses
Dead: 1,275; Wounded: 2,393; Missing: 165; Total: 3,833	Dead: 2,933; Wounded: 3,159; Captured: 7,000; Total: 13,092

The Second Schleswig War or German-Danish War, also sometimes known as the Prusso-Danish War or Dano-Prussian War, (Note: Other names by which the war is known include the Danish–Prussian War, the War of 1864, the Schleswig-Holstein War of Succession, and the Danish War.) was the second military conflict over the Schleswig–Holstein question of the 19th century. The war began on 1 February 1864, when Prussian and Austrian forces crossed the border into the Danish fief Schleswig. Denmark fought troops of the Kingdom of Prussia and the Austrian Empire representing the German Confederation.

Like the First Schleswig War (1848–1852), it was fought for control of the duchies of Schleswig, Holstein, and Lauenburg. Succession disputes concerning the duchies arose when Frederick VII, King of Denmark died without an heir acceptable to the German Confederation. The war started after the passing of the November Constitution of 1863, which tied the Duchy of Schleswig more closely to the Danish kingdom, which was viewed by the German side as a violation of the London Protocol.

The war ended on 30 October 1864, with the Treaty of Vienna and Denmark's cession of the Duchies of Schleswig (except for the island of Ærø, which remained Danish), Holstein and Saxe-Lauenburg to Prussia and Austria.

== Background ==
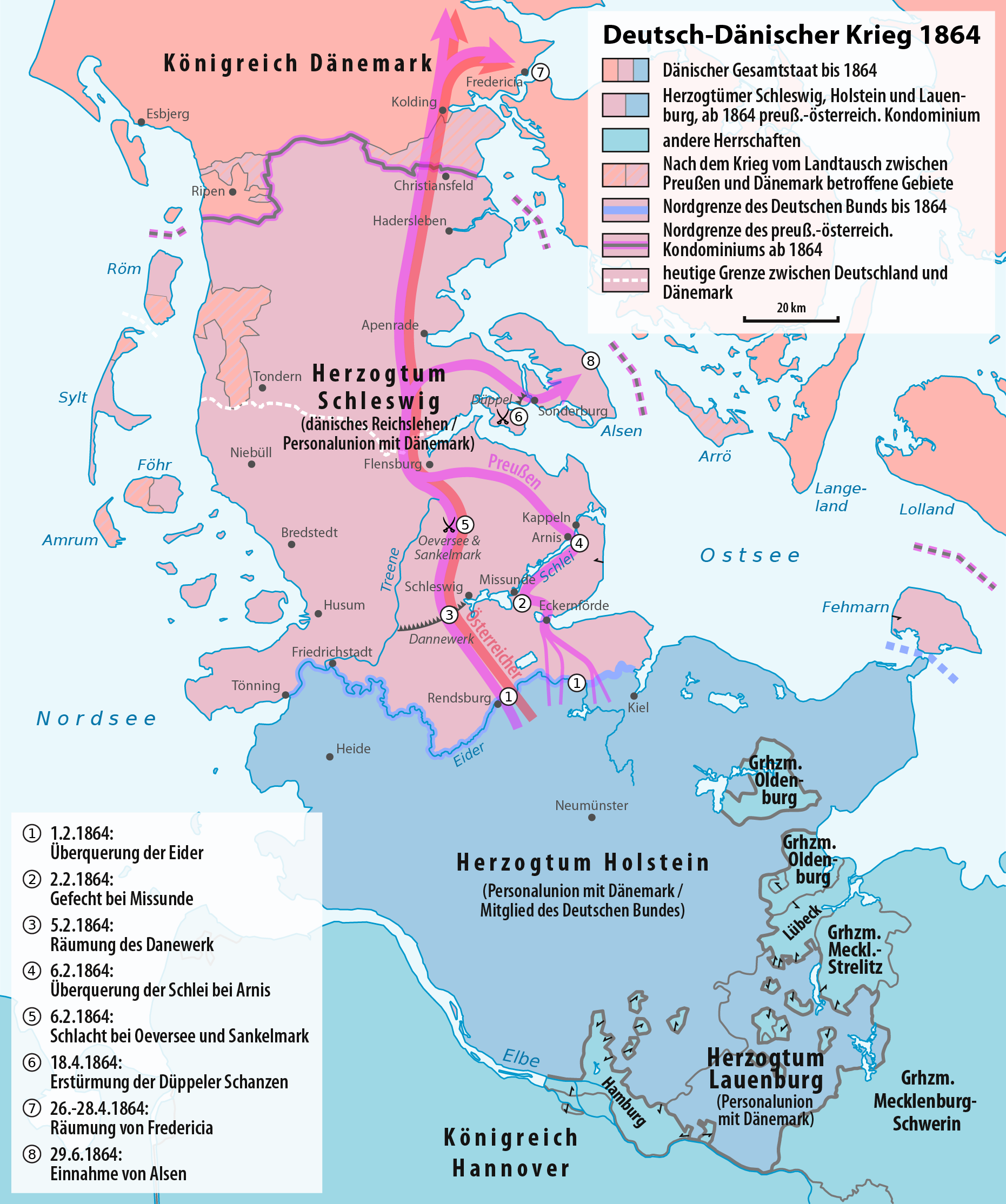
Military clashes in Schleswig/Slesvig.

In 1848, Denmark received its first liberal constitution. At the same time, and partly as a consequence, the secessionist movement of the large German majority in Holstein and southern Schleswig was suppressed in the First Schleswig War (1848–51), when the Germans in both territories failed in their attempt to become a united, sovereign and independent state: at the time, King Frederik VII of Denmark was also duke of the duchies of Holstein and Schleswig. The movement continued throughout the 1850s and 1860s, however, as Denmark attempted to integrate the Duchy of Schleswig into the Danish kingdom, while liberal proponents of German unification expressed the wish to include the Danish-ruled duchies of Holstein and Schleswig in a Greater Germany. Holstein was completely ethnically German, had been a German fief before 1806 and was a part of the German Confederation from 1815. Schleswig was a Danish fief and was linguistically mixed between Low German, Danish and North Frisian.

Before the Middle Ages, the people of Schleswig spoke Danish and Frisian, and as late as the 18th century, many rural areas of southern Schleswig still spoke Danish. In the early 19th century, the northern and middle parts of Schleswig spoke Danish, but the language in the southern half had shifted to German. German culture was dominant among the clergy and nobility; Danish had a lower social status and was spoken mainly by the rural population. For centuries, while the rule of the king was absolute, these conditions had created few tensions. When liberal and egalitarian ideas spread and nationalist currents emerged about 1820, identification was mixed between Danish and German: the German elites in Schleswig wished to be a part of Germany, while the Danes wanted Schleswig to be more firmly integrated into Denmark proper. Furthermore, there was a grievance about tolls charged by Denmark on ships passing through the Danish Straits between the Baltic Sea and the North Sea. To avoid that expense, Prussia and Austria planned to construct the Kiel Canal, which could not be built as long as Denmark ruled Holstein.

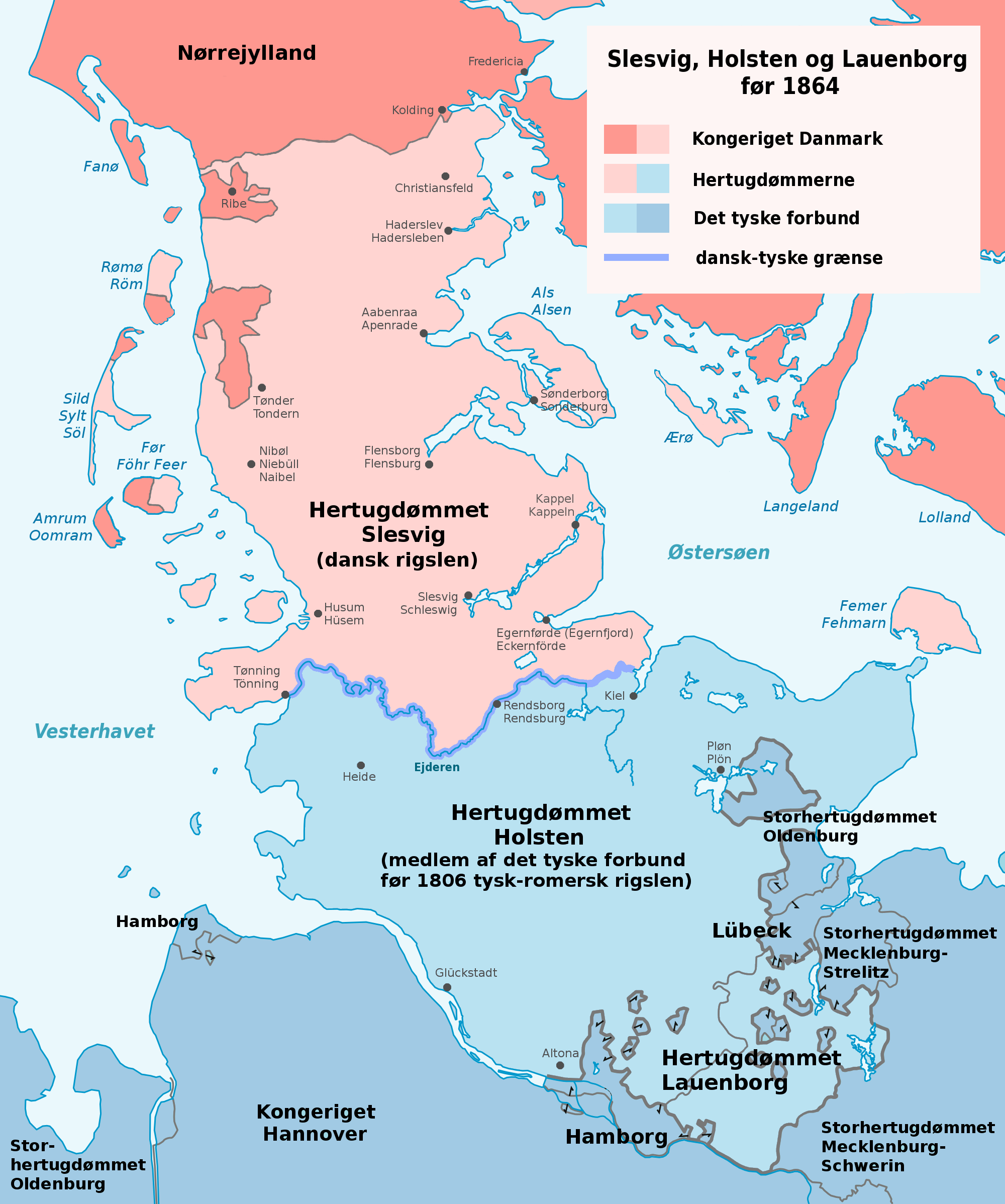
Schleswig, Holstein, and Lauenburg before the war.

Much of the dispute focused on the heir of King Frederik VII of Denmark. The Germans of Holstein and Schleswig supported the House of Augustenburg, a cadet branch of the Danish royal family, but the average Dane considered them too German and preferred the rival Glücksburg branch with Prince Christian of Glücksburg as the new sovereign. Prince Christian had served on the Danish side in the First Schleswig War (1848–1851). Both Britain and the Russian Empire wanted the Danish Straits, linking the North Sea to the Baltic Sea, to be controlled by a relatively weak power such as Denmark to allow their respective navies to either enter the Baltic, in the case of Britain, or exit the Baltic, in the case of Russia. During the First Schleswig war in 1848–49, Russia had threatened twice to enter the war on the side of Denmark, which proved to be the deciding factor in the outcome of the war.

The peace treaty that had ended the war in 1851 stipulated that the duchy of Schleswig should be treated the same as the duchy of Holstein regarding its relations with the Kingdom of Denmark. However, during the revisions of the 1848 constitution in the late 1850s and early 1860s, Holstein refused to acknowledge the revision, creating a crisis in which the parliament in Copenhagen ratified the revision but Holstein did not. In 1863, Frederik VII died, and the new Danish monarch, King Christian IX, ordered that the new constitution should apply to Schleswig and Denmark, but not to Holstein. This was a clear breach of the 1851 peace treaty and the London Protocol of 1852 and gave Prussia and the German Confederation a casus belli against Denmark. The German position was considerably more favourable than it had been thirteen years before, when Prussia had to give in due to the risk of military intervention by Britain, France and Russia on behalf of Denmark: France had colonial problems, not least with Britain. Otto von Bismarck had succeeded in obtaining cooperation from the Austrian Empire, which underlined its great power status within the German union, while Britain was upset that Denmark had violated the London Protocol.

To understand the Danish resolve in this question one must understand that the Danes regarded Schleswig as an ancient core region of Denmark. The southern part of Schleswig contains the ruins of the old Danish Viking "capital" Hedeby and the Danevirke fortification; its first sections were built around 400–500 CE, possibly to protect Denmark from migrating tribes during the age of migration. Before the Danes took possession of the area, around 500 CE, Schleswig was the home of the Angles, of which many migrated to Britain, where they later formed the Anglo-Saxon kingdoms; the remaining Angles are believed to have assimilated with the Danes, indeed the Angles and the Danes seem to have had a very close relationship as attested by the shared sagas of the early English and Danes. Thus, to suggest that the region did no longer fully belong to Denmark was seen as a great provocation to the Danes' ancestral claim to Schleswig.

The Germans, on the other hand, referred to medieval history: Already in 1326 and 1448, the Danish kings had accepted the almost complete independence of Schleswig from the Danish Crown. The Germans argued that the duchy had therefore not been part of Denmark proper for 400 years, but instead was "forever inseparable" (up ewich ungedeelt) from the German duchy of Holstein, something the Danish king had promised as early as 1460.

In short, the Danes considered Schleswig to be an integral part of Denmark and wished to make this clear by enacting a new constitution that excluded Holstein, while the Germans thought that Schleswig was inseparable from Holstein: If the Danish crown wished to treat the two Duchies differently, the only solution was, in their eyes, to get rid of Danish rule altogether. Both sides thus saw the other as the aggressor.

== The international situation ==
The Prussian minister-president, Otto von Bismarck, had been appointed to that position in 1862 with orders from the king to resolve a crisis caused by the unwillingness of the liberal lower house of the Landtag of Prussia to vote for increased taxes to pay for increased military spending. The refusal of the Landtag to vote for the taxes that the war minister, General von Roon, had insisted were absolutely necessary to pay for a program of military modernization had caused a profound political crisis. In effect, the liberal-dominated Landtag were making a bold bid to be co-equals along with the king in governing Prussia by asserting their "power of the purse" over the military. The kings of the House of Hohenzollern always jealously guarded their prerogatives to have sole control of the military, and King Wilhelm I was completely against making any concessions to the Landtag in exchange for the Landtag voting for the taxes to pay for military modernization.

The diplomat Bismarck had been appointed minister-president largely because the king believed that he was a man capable of having the Landtag vote for the Army Law taxes without making any concessions over the king's control of the military. Bismarck had a reputation of someone who was a gruff bully who liked to push other people around, but also a man of considerable charm and grace when he wanted to be. Finally, Bismarck was perceived as a man who was very clever in resolving apparently intractable problems while being very committed to upholding the existing system, and it was for this reason the king had appointed him minister-president, believing that he was the best man to resolve the crisis.

States part of the German Confederation, 1815–1866

Bismarck's "blood and iron" speech, in which he stated that the problems of Germany would be solved by "blood and iron" instead of talks, was an effort to win over the support of the liberals for his policy of increased taxes to pay for higher military spending. The Landtag refused to vote for the requested taxes. Bismarck solved the crisis simply by ordering the Prussian state to collect the taxes without the consent of the Landtag by claiming there was "a hole in the constitution" by saying if the Landtag and the king were deadlocked then the state had the right to collect taxes without the permission of the Landtag, a claim that he privately admitted to being nonsensical.

Bismarck's actions in having collecting taxes without the permission of the Landtag was manifestly illegal and unconstitutional, and made him unpopular. The liberals in Prussia also tended to be German nationalists who supported including the two duchies of Schleswig-Holstein into a projected unified German state, and Bismarck saw launching a war in the name of German nationalism as a way to bring around the liberals into supporting the Prussian state, all the more so as a war would demonstrate the value of a stronger Prussian army and thus justify the illegal taxes.

In the First Schleswig War, the possibility of Russian intervention on the side of Denmark had proved decisive in deciding the outcome of the war. The Crimean War had changed the entire posture of Russian foreign policy. Before the Crimean War, Russia had been the most reactionary of the European states and the one most committed to more or less upholding the status quo established by the Congress of Vienna in 1815. After the Crimean War, Russia was now a revisionist power out to challenge the European status quo, and any developments likely to change the European power structure were now welcome in St. Petersburg. Furthermore, the Crimean War and its aftermath made it extremely unlikely that Russia would work together with Britain or France, which established a room for maneuver for Prussia that did not exist in 1848–1850.

Tsar Alexander II saw the possibility of a stronger Prussia as a way of weakening France. During the Polish Uprising of 1863–1864, Napoleon III had taken a strongly pro-Polish line, which increased the already considerable mistrust and dislike of France in St. Petersburg (Kissinger lists this as a prime example of "strategic frivolity"). Alexander tended to favour a pro-Prussian line provided that Bismarck gave assurances that Prussia would not annex Denmark proper, and limit its ambitions to the two duchies.

Britain was the power most committed to supporting Denmark, but while Britain had the world's most powerful navy, the relatively small size of the all-volunteer British army led London to need a continental ally to provide the necessary military force on land. The Crimean War had so poisoned Anglo-Russian relations that it proved impossible for London and St. Petersburg to work together during the crisis. Additionally, in the American Civil War, the United States Navy blockaded the South, causing the so-called "cotton famine" that gravely damaged the British economy. Although Britain had found an alternative source of cotton in the form of Egypt, the "cotton famine" and the efforts of blockade runners to smuggle cotton out of the Confederate States of America to Britain had led to acute Anglo-American tensions with many Americans perceiving Britain to be supporting the Confederacy. The continual mistrust between Washington and London posed constraints on British foreign policy and limited London's options during the Second Schleswig War with much of the British Army being stationed in what is now Canada to guard against a possible American invasion.

Finally, after the Indian Mutiny of 1857–58, the British army in India was vastly increased. The fact that much of the British army was garrisoning India and Canada led to a shortage of British troops being free for operations in Europe.

In July 1863, British prime minister Lord Palmerston had given a speech saying:

I am satisfied with all reasonable men in Europe, including those in France and Russia, in desiring that the independence, the integrity and rights of Denmark may be maintained. We are convinced-I am convinced at least-that if any violent attempt were made to overthrow those rights and interfere with that independence, those who made the attempt, would in the result, that it would not be Denmark alone with they would have to contend with.

Palmerston's speech led to exaggerated hopes in Denmark of British intervention should the Schleswig-Holstein question come to war. However, the small size of the British army limited the United Kingdom's ability to intervene in Schleswig-Holstein together with the continual tensions with the United States required that Britain act in conjunction with another major European power such as Russia or France. Palmerston's speech was, in short, a bluff.

Napoleon III, the emperor of the French, was widely considered to be a reckless and dangerous adventurer, a man who was widely mistrusted by all the other powers. In 1861, Napoleon had France invade Mexico to install the Archduke Maximillian as the puppet emperor of Mexico. Britain was opposed to the French project in Mexico, causing much Anglo-French tension, making it unlikely that France and Britain would work together with regard to the Schleswig-Holstein question. On 15 November 1863, Napoleon had given a speech in Paris stating: "The compacts of 1815 have ceased to be in force". Accordingly, Napoleon invited 20 European leaders to a congress in Paris to discuss revisions in the European power structure.

Although the projected congress of Paris never occurred, Napoleon's gambit in openly rejecting the decisions of the Congress of Vienna led him to be perceived as a leader out to restore the French-dominated Europe of his namesake, and made it extremely unlikely that the other European powers would co-operate with France. Napoleon took a pro-Prussian line with regard to the Schleswig-Holstein question, seeing Prussian ambitions as helpful to his own plans.

In 1863, Édouard Drouyn de Lhuys, the French ambassador in Berlin, told Bismarck that France would support Prussia annexing the two duchies of Schleswig and Holstein provided that France received compensation by being allowed to annex parts of the Rhineland. Palmerston's rejection of having Britain attending the projected Congress of Paris was taken as a slight by Napoleon III, who notably refused British appeals during the war to co-operate against Prussia.

== Constitutional crisis (1848–1863) ==
After years of growing tension, the adoption of the Constitution of Denmark in 1848 had complicated matters further, as many Danes wished for the new liberal constitution to apply to all Danes, including those in Schleswig. The constitutions of Holstein and Schleswig were dominated by the Estates system, giving more power to the most affluent members of society, with the result that both Schleswig and Holstein were politically dominated by a predominantly German class of landowners. Thus two systems of government co-existed within the same state: a constitutional monarchy in Denmark, and absolutism in Schleswig and Holstein. The three units were governed by one cabinet, comprising liberal Danish ministers, who urged economic and social reforms, and conservative ministers, who opposed political reform. This caused a deadlock for practical lawmaking. Moreover, Danish opponents of this so-called Unitary State (Helstaten) feared that Holstein's presence in the government and simultaneous membership of the German Confederation would lead to increased German interference with Schleswig, and even in purely Danish affairs.

At the same time, liberal German politicians came to power in Schleswig and Holstein; their goal was to unify the two duchies, to gain independence from the Danish king and to join the German Confederation as a sovereign state. The objectives of the Danish and German liberals were therefore incompatible, which in 1848 ultimately led to war. In Germany, many people viewed the conflict of Schleswig as a war of liberation, while most Danes considered it German aggression.

In Copenhagen, the Palace and most of the administration (unlike most liberal politicians) supported a strict adherence to the status quo. The same applied to foreign powers, such as Great Britain, France and Russia, who would not accept a weakened Denmark in favour of Germany, nor a Prussia that had acquired Holstein with the important naval harbour of Kiel that controlled the entrance to the Baltic. After Prussia had therefore been forced to withdraw its support from the insurgents in Schleswig and Holstein in 1851, the Danes were able to defeat the rebels in the First Schleswig War. However, in 1852, they had to commit themselves to treat Schleswig constitutionally no different from Holstein. This contradicted the objective of the Danish liberals to fully reintegrate Schleswig into Denmark. In 1858, the German Confederation deposed the "union constitution" of the Danish monarchy concerning Holstein and Lauenburg, which were members of the Confederation. The two duchies were henceforth without any constitution, while the union constitution still applied to Schleswig and Denmark proper.

As the heirless King Frederik VII grew older, Denmark's successive National-Liberal cabinets became increasingly focused on maintaining control of Schleswig following the King's demise. The King died in 1863 at a particularly critical time; work on the November Constitution for the joint affairs of Denmark and Schleswig had just been completed, with the draft awaiting his signature. The new monarch, King Christian IX, felt compelled to sign the draft constitution on 18 November 1863, expressing grave concern. In doing so, the new king violated the London Protocol of 1852 and gave the Prussian minister-president, Otto von Bismarck, a justification for war.

This action caused outrage among the duchies' German population and a resolution was passed by the German Confederation at the initiative of Bismarck, calling for the occupation of Holstein by Confederate forces. The Danish government abandoned Holstein and pulled the Danish army back to the border between Schleswig and Holstein. Most of it fortified itself behind the Danevirke. This order to retreat without combat caused adverse comments among some Danish private soldiers, but the military circumstances made it wise to shorten the frontier that needed to be defended. Also, as the administrations of Holstein and Lauenburg were members of the German Confederation, not pulling back might have caused a severe political crisis and perhaps war with Great Britain, a guarantor of the London Protocol.

== The Danish strategy ==
So-called "flank positions" near Ebeltoft (North), the fortified city of Fredericia (center), and Dybbøl in the south were designed to support the strategy of defending the peninsula of Jutland along the north–south axis, using naval supremacy to move the army north–south, and hence trap an invading army in futile marches between these flank positions. This would deny the (assumed superior) invader the chance of forcing the defenders into a decisive battle, and give the defenders the opportunity to swiftly mass and counter-attack weak enemy positions, besieging forces, or divided forces by shifting weight by sea transport. The political dimension of this strategy was to draw out the war and hence give time and opportunity for the "great powers" to intervene diplomatically—it was assumed that such an intervention would be to the advantage of Denmark. This strategy had been successful in the First Schleswig War.

Unrealistic expectations of the potency of the Danish army, however, as well as incompetence at the political level had overruled the army command's wishes to defend Jutland according to the above plan, and instead favoured a frontal defense of Jutland on or near the historical defense (and legendary border) line at the Danevirke, near the city of Schleswig in the south. Hence resources had been put into the Danevirke line and not into the flank positions, which stayed akin to battlefield fortifications rather than modern fortifications capable of withstanding a modern bombardment.

The problem with the Danevirke line was that perhaps it was relatively strong against a frontal assault but leaned on bodies of water or marshes at both ends. In early 1864, these waters and marshes froze solid in a hard winter letting the Germans bypass the Danevirke. The first attempt to bypass the position failed near Missunde, but eventually the Germans appeared in force in the Danevirke's rear, compelling the Danish high command to order the line abandoned. As this decision was taken in violation of direct orders from the Danish government and in opposition to public opinion in Denmark, General de Meza was relieved of his command and replaced by the more loyal General Gerlach.

The Danish army then occupied another fortified line called "the old Dybbøl". This position did not bar the entrance to Jutland but only the tip of a peninsula jutting into the Baltic Sea. There is little doubt that the command of the army did not believe that they could successfully repulse a well-prepared German siege and consequent assault on the Dybbøl position, and assumed that the political level would let the army be evacuated by sea and then fight the war on the principles of the north–south axis strategy.

The political level, however, did not appreciate the gravity of the situation, insisting on maintaining military presence in Schleswig and at the same time refused more modest German demands of peace. Hence the army was ordered to defend the Dybbøl position "to the last man", and consequently the siege of Dybbøl began.

== Communications in the area ==
The only railways in 1864 in Denmark north of the Kongeå were a line in Sjælland from Copenhagen to Korsør, and one in northern Jutland from Århus to the northwest. Any reinforcements for the Danevirke from Copenhagen would have gone by rail to Korsør and thence by ship to Flensburg, taking two or three days, if not hindered by storm or sea-ice. There was a good railway system in the duchies, but not further north than Flensburg and Husum.

Schleswig city, Flensburg, Sønderborg, and Dybbøl were all connected by a road paved with crushed rock, this being the route the army took. The same road continued from Flensburg to Fredericia and Århus and this was the route later taken by the Prussian army when it invaded Jutland.

== Change in Danish law ==
On 18 November 1863, King Christian IX of Denmark signed the so-called "November constitution" establishing a shared law of succession and a common parliament for both Schleswig and Denmark. This was seen by the German Confederation as a violation of the 1852 London Protocol. On 28 November, the German Diet removed the Danish delegate for the duchies of Holstein and Lauenburg pending resolution of the succession issue and the naming of a new delegate from a government recognized by the Diet. On 24 December 1863, Saxon and Hanoverian troops marched into Holstein on behalf of the Confederation (as part as the federal execution, Bundesexekution, against Holstein). Supported by the German soldiers and by loyal Holsteiners, Frederick VIII, a claimant to both duchies, took control of the government of Holstein.

== Events ==
=== 1864 ===
==== January ====
In January the situation remained tense but there was no fighting; Danish forces controlled the north bank of the Eider River and German forces the south bank. All the inland waters (Eider River, Treene, Schlei, and the marshes east of Husum and around the Rheider Au) that the Danes were relying on as defence to guard the flanks of the Danevirke, were frozen hard and could be crossed easily.

Domestically, Bismarck had been under great pressure since a constitutional crisis in 1862, and he was hoping to gain public support among Prussian liberals by achieving the "liberation" of Schleswig. The decision to not settle for the occupation of the German Duchy of Holstein, but to invade Schleswig, was taken by the Prussian and Austrian governments alone. The other members of the German Confederation did not agree, and it was even discussed to declare war on the two great powers. However, due to the military superiority of the Prussians and Austrians, this did not happen.

On 14 January 1864, Austria and Prussia declared that they would take action against Denmark without regard to decisions of the German Confederation. On 16 January 1864, Bismarck issued an ultimatum to Denmark demanding that the November Constitution should be abolished within 48 hours. This was politically impossible, particularly given the short deadline, and the demand was consequently rejected by the Danish government.

==== February ====
At the start of the war, the Danish army consisted of about 38,000 men in four divisions. The 8th Brigade consisted of the 9th and 20th regiments (approximately 1,600 soldiers each), mainly soldiers from the middle and west and north of Jutland. About 36,000 men defended the Dannevirke, a job which it was said would have needed 50,000 men to do properly. The 1st Regiment had been changed from a battalion to a regiment on 1 December 1863.

The Prussian army had 37 battalions, 29 squadrons and 110 guns, approximately 38,400 men. The Austrian army had 20 battalions, 10 squadrons and 48 guns, approximately 23,000 men. During the war the Prussian army was strengthened with 64 guns and 20,000 men. The supreme commander for the Prussian-Austrian army was Field Marshal Friedrich Graf von Wrangel. The Austrian troops were led by General Ludwig von Gablenz.

Prussian and Austrian troops crossed into Schleswig on 1 February 1864 against the resistance of the Federal Assembly of the German Confederation, and war became inevitable. The Austrians attacked towards the refortified Danevirke frontally while the Prussian forces struck the Danish fortifications at Mysunde (on the Schlei coast of Schwansen east of Schleswig town), trying to bypass the Danevirke by crossing the frozen Schlei inlet, but in six hours could not take the Danish positions, and retreated.

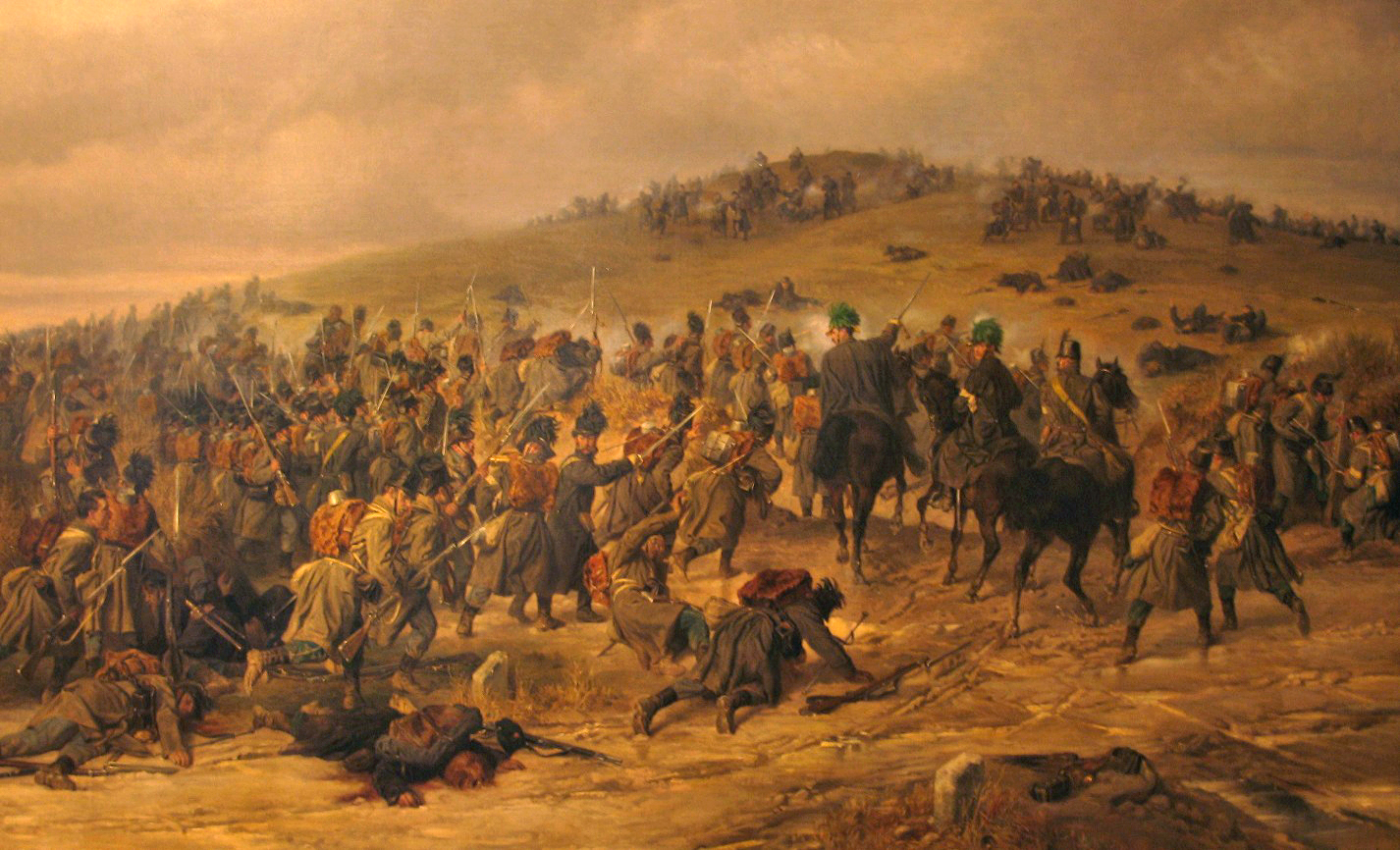
The Battle of Königshügel

In the Battle of Königshügel (Danish Kongshøj, translated 'King's Hill') near Selk on 3 February 1864, Austrian forces commanded by General Gondrecourt pushed the Danes back to the Danevirke. The Danish 6th Brigade had an important part. The battle was fought in a snowstorm at −10 °C (14 °F).

Danish fighting against Austrians at Selk and Kongshøj and Saksarmen on 3 February 1864 is described as follows:

The enemy sharpshooters immediately got reinforcement of a whole battalion, which advanced in a column with a music band which blew a storm-march, the battalion's commander followed on a horse, and after that the battalion's standard. Captain Stockfleth ordered his men to fire on the band and the battalion's commander and the standard-bearer. After that the storm-march sounded not so beautiful now that that lacked quite a few voices. The battalion commander's horse was shot under him. He grasped the standard when the standard-bearer fell, and now it went forward again with great strength.

A Danish military report dated 11 February 1864 describes incidents near Königshügel/Kongshøj and Vedelspang as follows:

On 3 February the Regiment's 1st Battalion occupied the Brigade's forward post line while its 2 Battalion stood as a reserve in Bustrup. The company commanders Daue and Steinmann under Major Schack's command increased its main position near Vedelspang while the Stockfleth Company stood between Niederselk and Alten Mühle as well as the Riise Company behind the dam near Haddeby. The 9th Regiment found its place about 1:30 pm and attacked an enemy unit which was coming from Geltorf and Brekendorf. The Stockfleth Company's main position, coming from Vedelspang, had advanced to Kongshøi, and Kastede the same distance behind the Danevirke rampart in front of Bustrup. In Bustrup the shooting was heard about 2:00 pm 2nd Battalion occupied the rampart and covered the withdrawing squads. The enemy pressed intensely in the east towards Haddebyer Noor, but was stopped here and remained fighting in one place until it turned dark. They sent a company to drive away the enemy from Vedelspang, but could not press further on than to towards the north part of the exercise ground.
The regiment's losses in this fighting: Dead, 1 corporal 1 undercorporal 7 privates; wounded, 2 corporals 3 undercorporals 18 privates; missing 11 privates.

— Fredericia 11 February 1864, Scholten, Oberstlieutenant and Regimentscommandeur.

On the night of 5 February 1864, the Danish commander-in-chief, Lieutenant General Christian Julius De Meza, abandoned the Danevirke to avoid being surrounded and withdrew his army to Flensburg. The retreat caused the deaths and capture of 600 men. Ten soldiers froze to death and were counted as a part of the casualties that night. The hasty retreat also forced the Danes to abandon their important heavy artillery.

The railway from the south to Flensburg was never properly used during this evacuation and the Danish army only evacuated what men and horses could carry or pull by road, leaving behind much artillery, most importantly heavy artillery. Some hours later, the Prussians and Austrians discovered the retreat and started to pursue.

This withdrawal to Als and Dybbøl has gone down in Danish history as one of the worst experiences that Danish soldiers have been exposed to. Some of them compared it to Napoleon's retreat from Moscow. It was northwards in a north gale with driven snow, and most of the soldiers had no rest for the last four days and nights. The march was burdened with artillery guns and supply carts and had to be as slow as its slowest component. Men and horses had trouble standing. Horses could not carry or pull their loads properly because of the snow and ice; riders had to dismount and lead their horses. Artillery guns and carts overturned. The column of men and horses and vehicles seemed endless. The army had to march from the Danevirke to Flensburg, which took about 14–18 hours. (Schleswig, Schleswig-Holstein is at the east end of the Danevirke and is 20 mi from Flensburg as the crow flies. The march was actually longer than 20 mi because soldiers had to walk from their positions to Schleswig, Schleswig-Holstein first.) They also had to fight rearguard against pursuing Prussians and Austrians. Some men in sight of Flensburg and thankful for the coming rest were ordered to stop or go back to man checkpoints. Many men were missing at the roll call, and the army thought that many Schleswigian soldiers had deserted during the march and went home. However, most of them came in that morning or the next morning.

Near Stolk-Helligbek, about 10 kilometers north of Schleswig, pursuing Austrians reached them, and in heavy fighting near Oversø, the 9th and 20th regiments of the 8th Brigade lost 600 men dead, injured and captured. On that day ten Danish soldiers died of hypothermia.

The Prussians crossed the frozen Schlei at Arnis on 6 February 1864, defeating the Danes there.

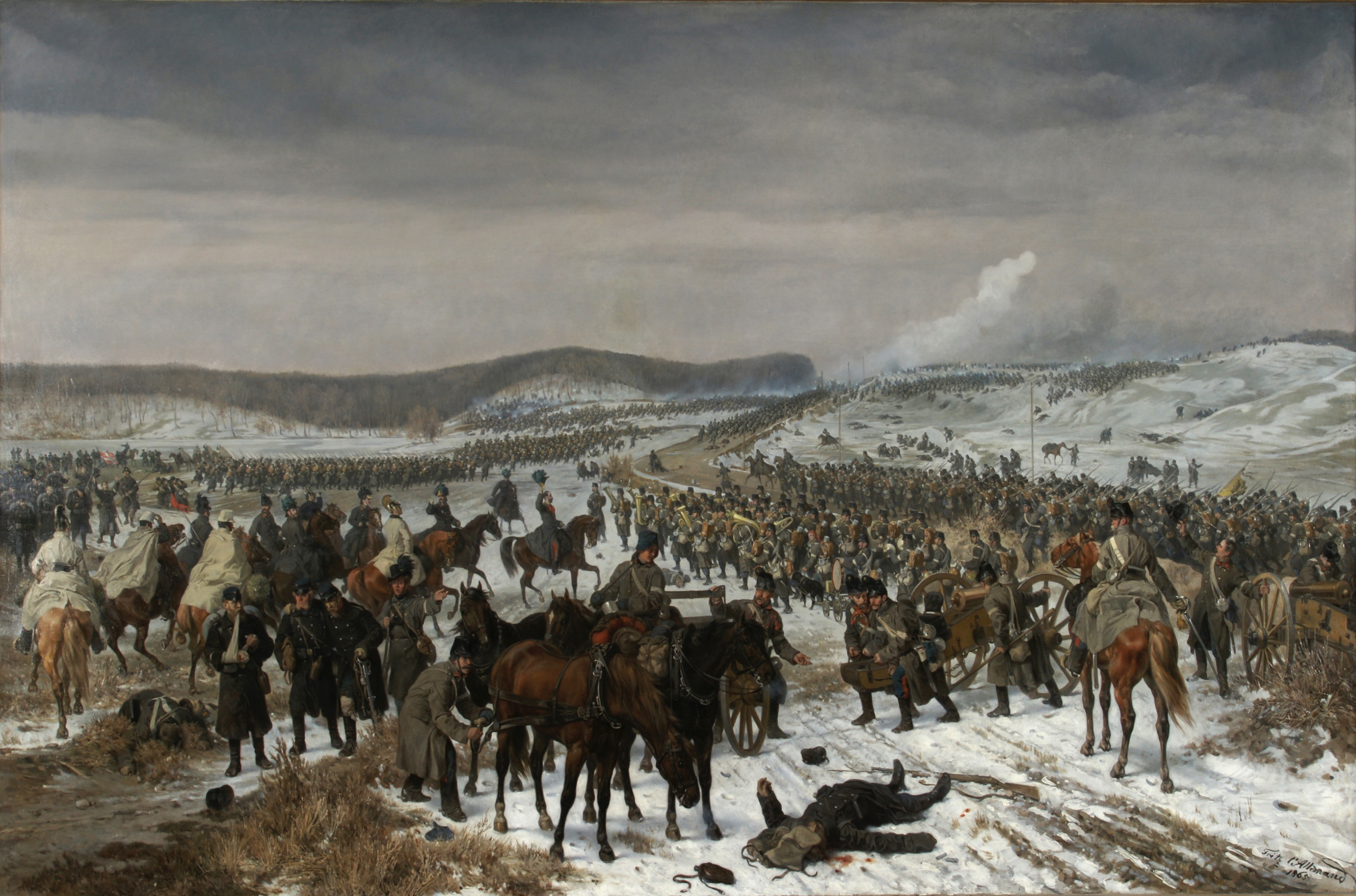
The Battle of Sankelmark

In the Battle of Sankelmark (about eight kilometers south of Flensburg) pursuing Austrians caught up with the Danish rearguard, which consisted of the 1st and 11th regiments. The Danes were commanded by Colonel Max Müller. A hard fight, where large parts of 1st Regiment were taken prisoner, stopped the Austrians, and the retreat could continue. However, the Danes lost more than 500 men there. After a short rest and some food and drink in Flensburg, the 8th Brigade had to march to Sønderborg, where they were taken by ship to Fredericia. Soldiers packed the ship and could not lie down to rest. Furthermore, some had to stay outside on the deck and were nearly frozen. Other units stayed in Dybbøl; some reportedly were so exhausted on arrival that they laid on the ground in heaps three or four deep to sleep.

The loss of the Danevirke without a fight, which in the 19th century played a big role in Danish national mythology due to its long history, caused a substantial psychological shock in Denmark and, as a result, de Meza had to resign from supreme command. Denmark never again ruled the Danevirke. The Austrians, under general Ludwig Karl Wilhelm von Gablenz, marched north from Flensburg, while the Prussians advanced east on Sønderborg.

On 18 February 1864, some Prussian hussars, in the excitement of a cavalry skirmish, crossed the north frontier of Schleswig into Denmark proper and occupied the town of Kolding. An invasion of Denmark itself had not been part of the original programme of the allies. Bismarck determined to use this circumstance to revise the whole situation. He urged upon Austria the necessity for a strong policy, to settle, comprehensively, the question of the duchies and the wider question of the German Confederation; Austria reluctantly consented to press the war.

The Austrian army decided to stop at the north frontier of Schleswig. Some Prussians moved against Kolding and Vejle. On 22 February 1864, Prussian troops attacked the Danish forward line at Dybbøl, pushing them back to the main defence line.

==== March ====
- 8 March 1864: Bismarck pushes the Austrians into moving into Denmark proper.
- Austrian forces capture Vejle after fierce house-to-house combat. The Danish units involved retreat to Horsens and later to Vendsyssel. In Fredericia, the Danish 8th Brigade's 20th Regiment ub involved in a bigger skirmish: the regiment's first Company are captured near Snoghøj, on the mainland near where the (old) Lillebælt bridge is now. The rest of Fredericia's garrison retreat to Fyn.
- 15 March 1864: Prussian siege artillery begin to bombard the Danish fortifications at Dybbøl from positions at Broager.
- 17 March 1864: The Prussian army drives back the Danish outposts in front of Dybbøl. In the naval Battle of Jasmund (also known as the Battle of Rügen), a Prussian naval force attempts to break the Danish naval blockade of Schleswig and Holstein, but is pushed back to Swinemünde.
- 22 March 1864: A fresh agreement is signed between the powers, under which the compacts of 1852 are declared to be no longer valid, and the position of the duchies within the Danish monarchy as a whole is to be made the subject of a friendly understanding.
- 28 March 1864: Dybbøl is again attacked, but in vain.

==== April ====
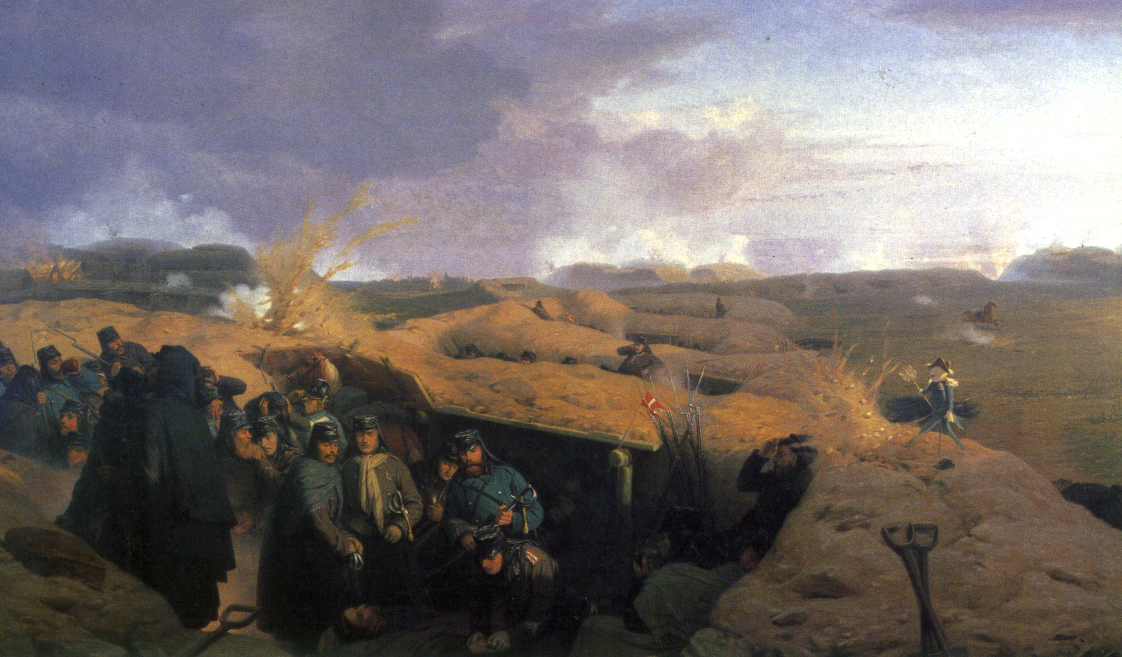
The Battle of Dybbøl

- 2 April 1864: Prussian artillery begin bombarding Danish fortifications at Dybbøl and the town of Sønderborg. By 18 April 1864, the Prussians have fired about 65,000 shells.
- 4 April 1864: Danish soldiers repel a Prussian attack on Dybbøl.
- 18 April 1864: The Battle of Dybbøl. After six hours of artillery preparations, 10,000 Prussian soldiers storm Dybbøl fort at 10:00 am. The Danish 8th Brigade counterattack bravely, but is defeated, with 1,700 Danish casualties. (18 April is a military memorial day in Denmark commemorating this defeat, including a ceremony on Dybbøl fort hill.)
- 25 April 1864: The Danish army commanded by General Niels Christian Lunding, on direct order from the Minister of War, abandons Fredericia, which is besieged by Austrian soldiers.
- 25 April 1864–25 June 1864: The London Conference of 1864 discusses the political issues involved.

==== May ====
Prince Friedrich Karl of Prussia becomses supreme commander of the Austro-Prussian allied army and conquers Jutland.

- 9 May 1864: Naval Battle of Helgoland.
- 12 May 1864: The conference in London leads to a ceasefire, which soon breaks down, as they cannot agree on a clear fixing of the boundaries; partitioning the duchy of Schleswig is seen as possible. War continues. Prussians from beside Dybbøl bombard Sønderborg.
- 26 May 1864: Prussian artillery fires on Als.

==== June ====
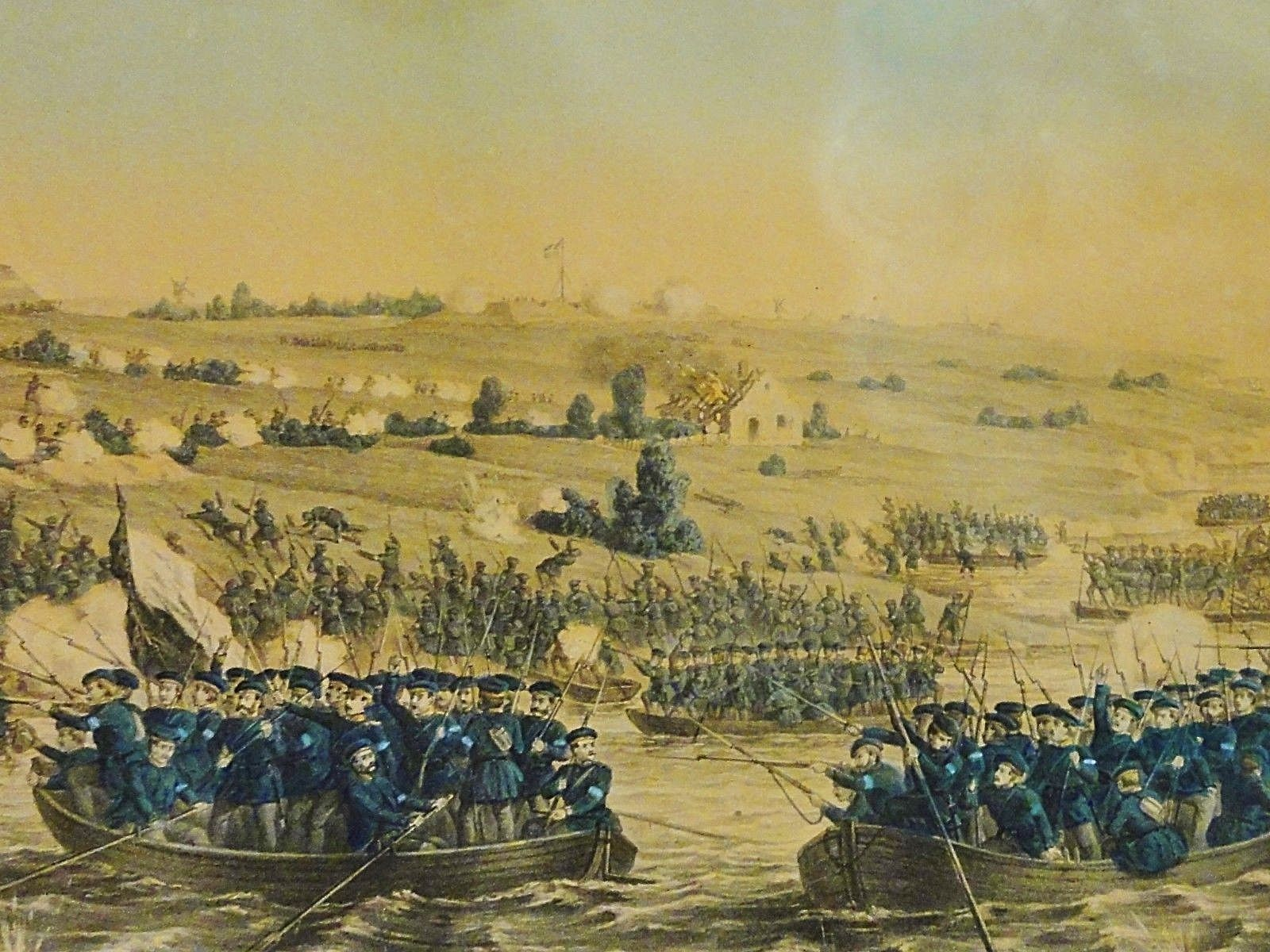
Prussian crossing to Als

- 24 June 1864: Seeing that the truce is ending, Austria and Prussia arrive at a new agreement, that the war is to completely separate the duchies from Denmark.
- 25 June 1864: The conference in London breaks up without having arrived at any conclusion.
- 29 June 1864: The Danish garrison from Dybbøl has taken refuge on the island of Als. Prussian soldiers cross from the mainland on boats on the evening of 29 June. Battle of Als. The Prussians carry out attacks on the Danish entrenchments and capture the island under heavy fire. This is the last major engagement of the war.
- 30 June 1864: The Prince's Life Regiment is the last unit of the Danish army to leave Schleswig and Holstein.

==== July ====
- 3 July 1864: A Danish force commanded by Lieutenant Colonel Charles Beck attacks a Prussian force at Lundby south of Ålborg in the north of Jutland. See Battle of Lundby. This is the last battle in the Second Schleswig War.
- 14 July 1864: The Prussian general Eduard Vogel von Falckenstein signs his name in the church book at Skagen at the north tip of Jutland. With this, all of Jutland, the Danish mainland, is occupied by the Germans. Now the Danish islands are also endangered, and the Danish government again has to accept an armistice and peace negotiations, now however under more difficult conditions.

==== August and after ====
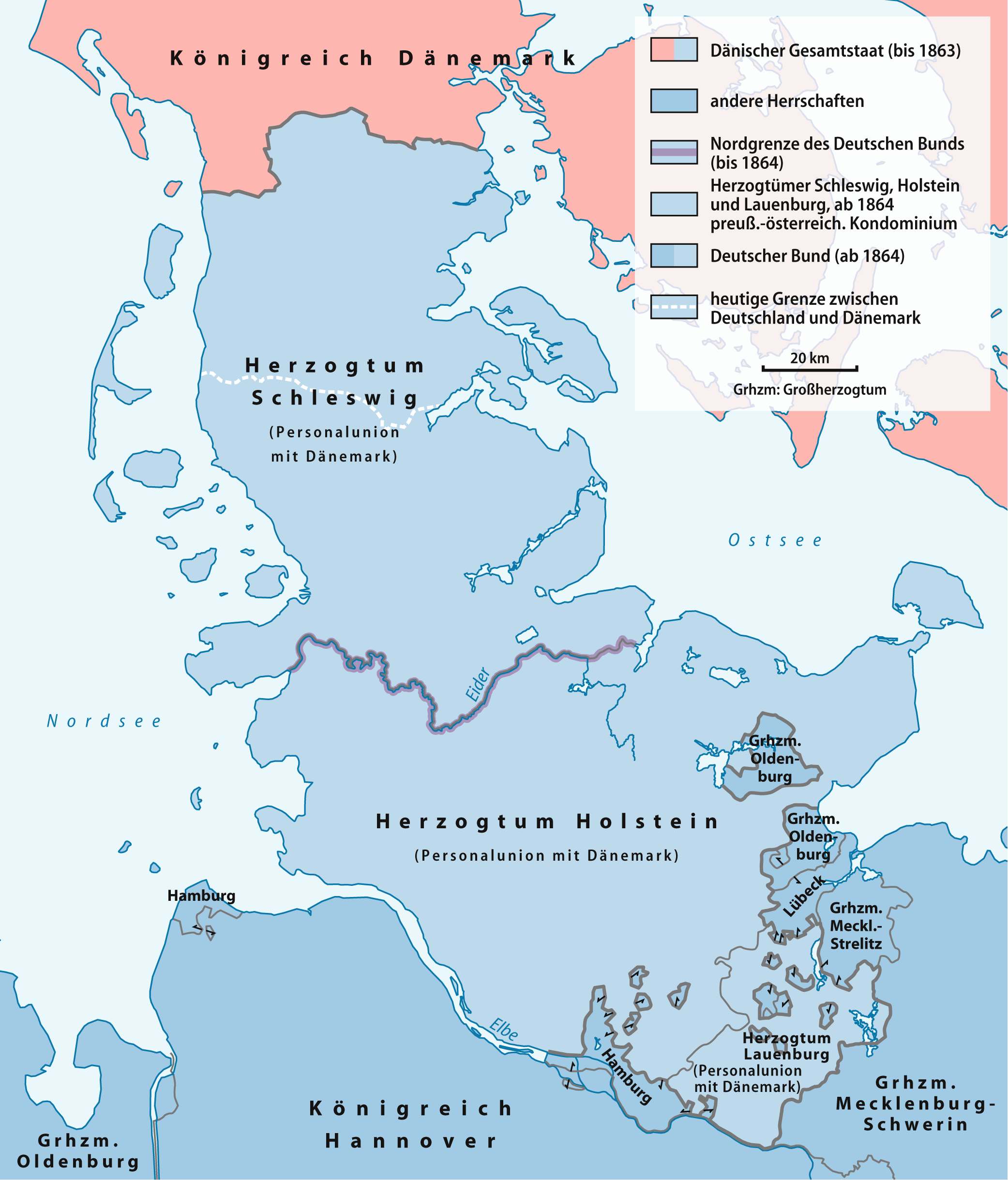
Map of the territorial changes, without the royal Danish enclaves (German).

The preliminaries of a peace treaty were signed on 1 August 1864: the King of Denmark renounced all his rights in the duchies in favour of the Emperor of Austria and the King of Prussia.

In the Treaty of Vienna on 30 October 1864, Denmark ceded Schleswig, Holstein and Lauenburg to Prussia and Austria. Denmark was also forced to surrender the enclaves in western Schleswig that were legally part of Denmark proper and not part of Schleswig, but was allowed to keep the island of Ærø (which had been administered as part of Schleswig), the town of Ribe and its surrounding land, and eight parishes from Tyrstrup Herred south of Kolding. As a result of the peace settlement, the land area of the Danish monarchy decreased by 40% and the total population reduced from 2.6 million to 1.6 million (about 38.5%). The Danish frontier had retreated about 250 km as measured from the furthest corner of the Duchy of Lauenburg to the new frontier on the Kongeå river.

When the Danish army returned to Copenhagen after this war, they received no cheering or other public acclaim, unlike on their victorious return after the First Schleswig War.

== Aftermath ==
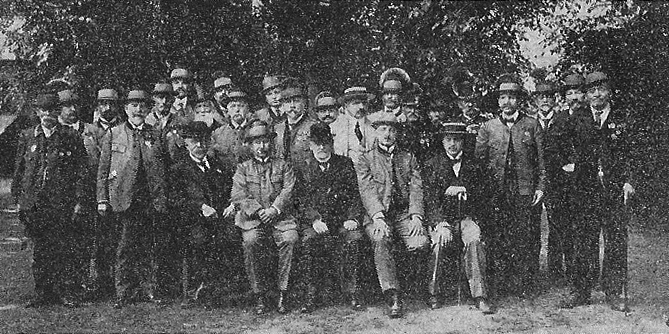
Austrian veterans from the Second Schleswig War of 1864; photograph taken in 1914 from an excursion they took to Vejle in Denmark the same year.

In the Prussian forces' first clash of arms since reorganization, their effectiveness proved clear, something the Austrians ignored to their cost 18 months later in the Austro-Prussian War, and contributed to a perception in the German states that Prussia was the only state that could defend the other German states against external aggression. (See Unification of Germany.) Prussia and Austria took over the respective administration of Schleswig and Holstein under the Gastein Convention of 14 August 1865. About 200,000 Danes came under German rule.

Following the loss, Christian IX went behind the backs of the Danish government to contact the Prussians, offering that the whole of Denmark could join the German Confederation, if Denmark could stay united with Schleswig and Holstein. This proposal was rejected by Bismarck, who feared that the ethnic strife in Schleswig between Danes and Germans would then stay unresolved. Christian IX's negotiations were not publicly known until published in the 2010 book Dommedag Als by Tom Buk-Swienty, who had been given access to the royal archives by Queen Margrethe II.

The Peace of Prague in 1866 confirmed Denmark's cession of the two duchies, but promised a plebiscite to decide whether north Schleswig wished to return to Danish rule. This provision was unilaterally set aside by a resolution of Prussia and Austria in 1878.

The French control over the power arrangements in Germany, enjoyed by France for centuries (since Cardinal Richelieu), was lost, precipitating the rise of Germany that eventually culminated in the First World War.

=== Effects on Denmark ===
The war is generally considered to be a national trauma for Denmark.

Despite Charles XV's promise to send troops, Sweden-Norway refused to aid Denmark. Consequently, the pan-Scandinavism movement focused henceforth on literature and language rather than political unification. Likewise, the war proved to be a diplomatic setback for the British government, whose attempts to mediate the conflict and deter Prussia were rebuffed.

The war also shocked Denmark out of any idea of using war as a political tool. Danish forces were not involved in war outside their frontiers until the 1999 NATO bombing of the Federal Republic of Yugoslavia. It became clear that, against the might of Germany, Denmark could not assert her survival with her own arms; this played a crucial role in the "adjustment policy" and later "Cooperation policy" during the Nazi-German occupation in World War II.

From a Danish perspective, perhaps the most grievous consequence of the defeat was that thousands of Danes living in the ceded lands were conscripted into the Imperial German Army in World War I and suffered huge casualties on the Western Front. This is still (but waning in time as the children of the conscripted men are dying out) a cause of resentment among many families in the southern parts of Jutland and the direct reason why a German offer of a joint centenary anniversary in 1966 was rejected.

After the German Empire's defeat in 1918, the Danish government asked the Allied Powers and the Versailles Conference of 1919 to include a plebiscite in the disputed Schleswig region based on Woodrow Wilson's Fourteen Points as part of the Allied Powers' peace settlement with Germany, and this request was granted by the Allies. As a result of the plebiscite, North Schleswig was returned to Denmark.

=== Effects on Germany ===
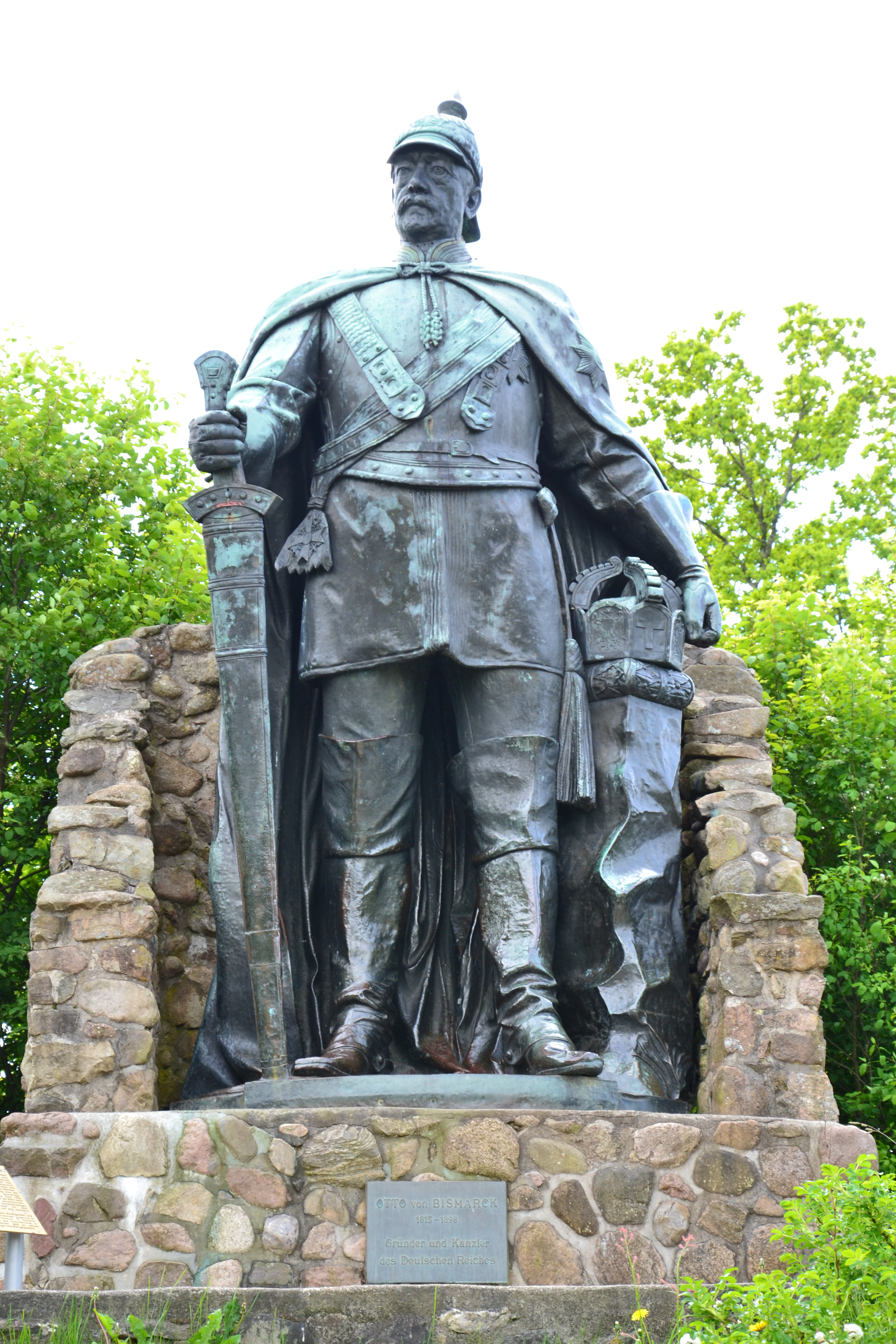
Statue of Otto von Bismarck in Schleswig-Holstein

Bismarck's triumph in the Second Schleswig War succeeded in winning the support of the Prussian liberals for his government. In the aftermath of the war, the liberal-dominated Landtag ended up submitting to Bismarck over the issue of the taxes that Bismarck had collected without the consent of the Landtag. The Second Schleswig war marked the beginning of the decline of Prussian liberalism as the British historian Brian Bond noted that Prussian liberals otherwise opposed to Bismarck were "extremely susceptible to the appeal of national unity achieved by force of arms". The victory of Prussia over Denmark was also the victory of the Prussian state over the liberal-dominated Landtag, who, caught up in the national euphoria of the victory over Denmark, meekly submitted to Bismarck and voted to retroactively legalize the illegal taxes that Bismarck had imposed. The nationalism of the Prussian liberals turned out to be stronger than their liberalism, and as a result of the war, Prussian liberals generally ceased to oppose Bismarck and instead became his supporters. In particular, the way that Bismarck had imposed illegal taxes-which had once made him unpopular-was seen as a sign of his greatness, and Bismarck came to be celebrated for violating the 1850 constitution. In this way, Bismarck ended the liberal challenge to the Prussian state.

After his death in 1898, Bismarck came to be the subject of an immense personality cult in Germany, being portrayed as a super-human larger-than-life figure, the "great redeemer" who had finally achieved German unification. The German diplomat Count Harry Kessler wrote sadly in 1935 from his exile in France that by the beginning of the 20th century the German middle class had become so "Bismarckian" in their political views that "a lethal atmosphere" had been created to such an extent that anyone who had any views that were even remotely critical of the state that Bismarck had created was a pariah. In the Weimar Republic, German conservatives used the memory of Bismarck as a larger-than-life figure as a way to delegitimize the Weimar Republic as being "against the spirit of Bismarck". In the German conservative narrative, the November Revolution of 1918 was portrayed not only as the alleged "stab-in-the-back" that had caused Germany's defeat in the First World War at the supposed moment when Germany was on the brink of winning the war, but also a rejection of Bismarck's legacy. The fact that the people who founded the Weimar Republic were liberals, Social Democrats and the Zentrum – all groups whom Bismarck had denounced as "enemies of the Reich" – was used to present the Weimar Republic as an illegitimate state that should not exist. Central to the conservative "Bismarck cult" narrative was the theme that democratic parliamentary government such as existed under the Weimar Republic was weak and ineffective, and what Germany needed was a Führer ('Leader'), a ruthless dictator who would do what was necessary to make Germany recognized as a powerful state. The way that Bismarck had imposed illegal taxes in 1862 which made it possible for Prussia to defeat Denmark in 1864 was presented in the "Bismarck cult" narrative as an example of the sort of leader that Germany needed who would break the law if necessary for the greater good of the Prussian-German state.

=== Effects on humanitarian aid ===
The Infirmary Flag (Ambulanceflaget), adopted in 1850 and replaced in 1870 by the Red Cross

The Second Schleswig War was the first war to be fought after the establishment of the Red Cross movement in 1863. Both Denmark and Prussia had already established national Red Cross societies, and the International Committee of the Red Cross sent observers to evaluate their work. Both Red Cross societies established hospitals and provided impartial care to wounded soldiers, and were covered in newspapers internationally. The war drew attention to the nascent Red Cross movement and drew volunteers to the movement.

== In popular culture ==
Danish author Herman Bang wrote about the war and its effects on the island of Als in his novel Tine, published in 1889. The book has been translated into many languages, including English, and is considered to be an example of an impressionist novel.

In his novel The Riddle of the Sands (1903), Irish novelist Erskine Childers refers to the Dybbøl, when protagonists Davies and Carruthers encounter the (then present) German victory monument during a stop at Sønderborg on their Baltic yachting expedition.

In the M. R. James short story "Nr. 13" references are made to the war. "Is this," he said, "the Danish courage I have heard so much of? It isn't a German in there; and if it was, we are five to one."

The 2014 Danish TV series 1864 depicts the Second Schleswig War.

The protagonist of the movie The Salvation is a veteran of the Second Schleswig War, who emigrates to America.

== See also ==
- Wars and battles involving Prussia
- Berlin Victory Column
- 1864 (TV series)
- First Schleswig War

== Bibliography ==
- Brunbech, Peter Yding (3 November 2014). "Krigen i 1864" [The War in 1864]. danmarkshistorien.dk (in Danish). Aarhus University. Archived from the original on 28 August 2016.
- Embree, Michael (2005). Bismarck's First War: The Campaign of Schleswig and Jutland, 1864. Helion. ISBN 978-1-874622-77-2.
- Taylor, A. J. P. (1954). The Struggle for Mastery in Europe: 1818–1918. London: Folio Society. pp. 142–155. OCLC 49987625.
