= Marie Tourell Søderberg =

Danish actress (born 1988)

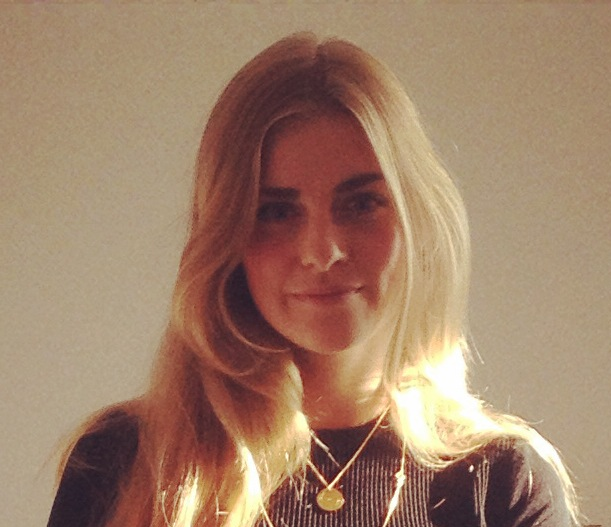
- Marie Tourell Søderberg
- Born: 26 July 1988 (age 38); Nørrebro, Copenhagen, Denmark
- Education: Lee Strasberg Theatre and Film Institute; Danish National School of Performing Arts
- Occupation: Actress
- Years active: 2003–present

Marie Tourell Søderberg (born 26 July 1988) is an actress known for 1864 (2014) and Itsi Bitsi (2015). She graduated from Lee Strasberg Theatre and Film Institute in New York in 2007 and finished her education at the Danish National School of Performing Arts in June 2012.

She is also the author of Hygge – The Danish art of Happiness, a book written together with the journalist Kathrine Højte Lynggaard, interviewing Danes about their relationship to the phenomenon hygge.

== Film ==
Year	Title	Role	Director	Notes
2003	Øjeblink		Kaspar Munk	
2004	Kysss	Line	Kaspar Munk	
2004	Simon	Janni Spies	Nikolaj Cederholm	
2006	Forsvunden	Christine	Kaspar Munk	
2007	D + R	Dea	Camille Alsted	
2009	Implosion	Nanna	Balder Skånstrøm-Bo	
2010	Alice in Wonderland	Alice	Tim Burton	Dubbing
2013	Spies & Glistrup	Janni Spies	Christoffer Boe	
2013	Without You	Stine	Asger Lindgaard	
2014	Mikado	Ditte	Simon Lykke	
2015	Itsi Bitsi	Iben Nagel Rasmussen	Ole Christian Madsen	
2015	The Stranger	Hanne	Aske Bang	
2016	1864 - brødre i krig	Inge	Ole Bornedal	
2016	Needle Boy	Lisa	Alexander Bak Sagmo	
2016	Sofa	Vera	Anna Emma Haudal	
2018	Nina	Nina	Maria Winther Olsen	

== Television ==
Year	Title	Role	Notes
2004	Forsvar	Nicole Hansen	
2006	Klovn	Marie, "pige med stomipose"	
2007	Kika og Bob	Kika	Voice
2012-2015	Violetta	Violetta	Voice
2014	1864	Inge	
2014	Limbo	Skønjomfru	
2017	Herrens Veje	Nanna	
2020	Rita	Pil	
