= Battle of Dybbøl =

Battle of the Second Schleswig War

Coordinates: 54°54′25″N 9°45′29″E

- Part of the Second Schleswig War
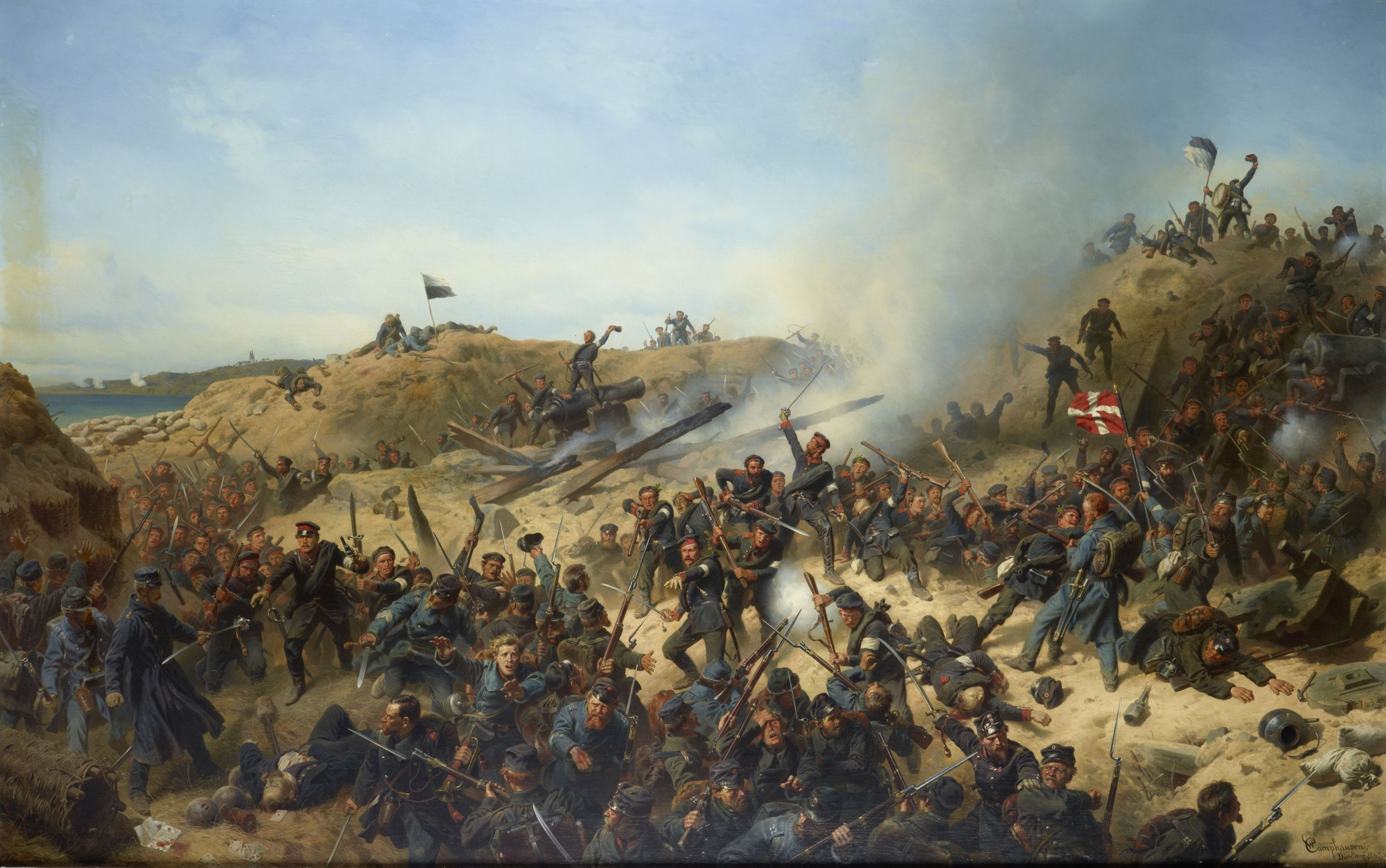
- The Battle of Dybbøl; Wilhelm Camphausen, 1864
Date	7 April – 18 April 1864
Location	Dybbøl, Denmark
Result	Prussian victory

Belligerents
(Kingdom of Prussia) Prussia	Denmark

Commanders and leaders
(Kingdom of Prussia) Prince Friedrich Karl	(Denmark) Georg Gerlach

Strength
11,000 (first wave); 26,000 (in reserve); 126 guns	5,000 (at the defences) 6,000 (in reserve); 66 guns 11 mortars 1 ironclad warship

Casualties and losses
263 killed 909 wounded 29 missing Total: 1,201	671 killed 987 wounded 3,534 captured Total: 5,192

The Battle of Dybbøl (Danish: Slaget ved Dybbøl; German: Erstürmung der Düppeler Schanzen) was the key battle of the Second Schleswig War, fought between Denmark and Prussia. The battle was fought on the morning of 18 April 1864, following a siege that began on 2 April. Denmark suffered a severe defeat which – with the Prussian capture of the island of Als – ultimately decided the outcome of the war, forcing Danish cession of the duchies of Schleswig and Holstein.

== Background ==
Following the annexation of the Duchy of Schleswig in November 1863 by Danish king Christian IX (who was also the Duke of Schleswig), Prussia and Austria invaded Jutland in January 1864. The defending Danish infantry was equipped with French M1822 percussion muskets converted to Minié rifling and with Tapriffel M1864s. The Prussian army used the Dreyse needle-gun, a breech-loading rifle.

Dybbøl had also been the site of a battlefield in the First Schleswig War. Dybbøl fort, also called 'Dybbøl Skanser', lies on a short blunt peninsula that defends against access to the fort by land and featured an enclosed pier for the ferry across the Alssund to Sønderborg on the island of Als. It was constructed between 1861 and 1864 and consisted of seven large and three smaller redoubts.

The Dybbøl position was ill-prepared as a result of too much effort expended on fortifying the Danevirke. In particular, it lacked safe shelters in the forward line. Technological developments in artillery (particularly long-range rifled guns) had made the geography of the position unsuited for a lengthy defense. The line had too little depth, and across the waters of the southern inlet (forming the southern part of the peninsula) modern guns could subject the main defensive line to raking fire along its length. This meant that not only was the position effectively saturated during the approximately two months of bombardment, but also most of the defending crew had to be withdrawn far behind the line because of attrition by the bombardment and lack of effective shelters, and when the assault finally came, the line was consequently undermanned by tired troops.

However, the Danes did have one major advantage in that they had more or less unchallenged command of the sea and were able to deploy the modern ironclad Rolf Krake to the scene to support ground forces at Dybbøl with shore bombardments from its turret-mounted eight-inch guns. For much of the siege, Rolf Krake was used as a mobile heavy seaborne artillery platform and the Prussians were almost helpless to counter it, since they had no naval forces of their own capable of matching the Danish navy, a fact that sapped Prussian morale. For this reason, some Danish generals thought that the Prussians would not dare to mount a frontal attack.

== Battle ==
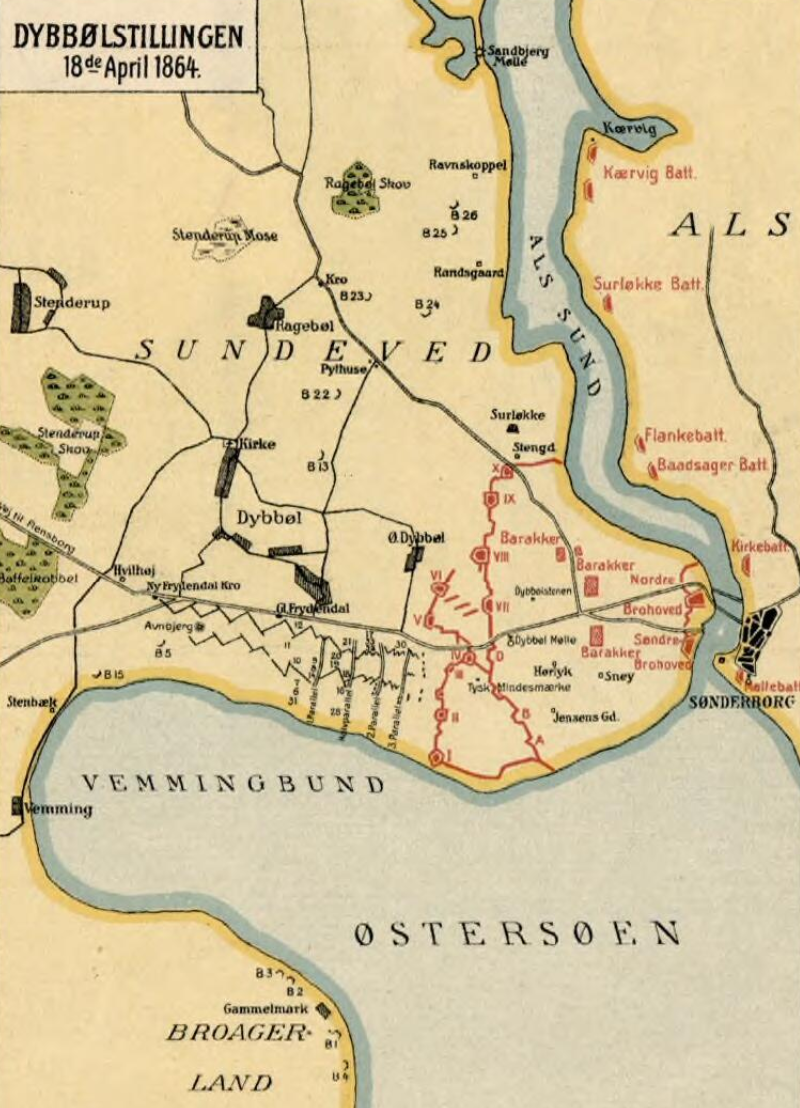
Map of the Prussian and Danish positions on 18 April, depicting the ten Danish redoubts.

On the morning of 18 April 1864 at Dybbøl, the Prussians moved into their positions at 02:00. At 10:00 Prussian artillery bombardment stopped and the Prussians charged; shelling from the Rolf Krake did not prove enough to halt them. Thirteen minutes after the charge, the infantry had already seized control of the first line of defense of the redoubts.

Destruction of the retreating Danish forces was avoided when the Prussian advance was halted by a counterattack by the 8th Brigade, until another Prussian attack threw them back; that attack advanced about 1 km and reached Dybbøl Mill, and therefore contributed to the soldiers on the northern flank (the crew at redoubts 7–10), avoiding large losses or capture. It has subsequently been debated why the counterattack only came after half an hour of fighting. Some sources assume that due to the loud sounds that came from the battle, it was impossible to hear the signal, while others suggest that the brigade's commander Glode du Plat hesitated to give orders for the counterattack.

The 8th Brigade fought hard, but when Friedrich Karl deployed additional reserves, it retreated with heavy losses. In that counterattack the 8th Brigade had lost 1,399 of its 3,000 men, but it had allowed the remnants of the 1st and 3rd Brigades to escape to the pier opposite Sønderborg. At 13:30 the last resistance collapsed at the bridgehead in front of Sønderborg. After that there was an artillery duel across the Alssund.

The Battle of Dybbøl was the first battle monitored by delegates of the Red Cross: Louis Appia (1818–98) and Charles van de Velde (1818–98). Danish forces withdrew to the island of Als; the Prussians used the fortifications as a staging point to attack the island in late June the next month.

== Aftermath ==
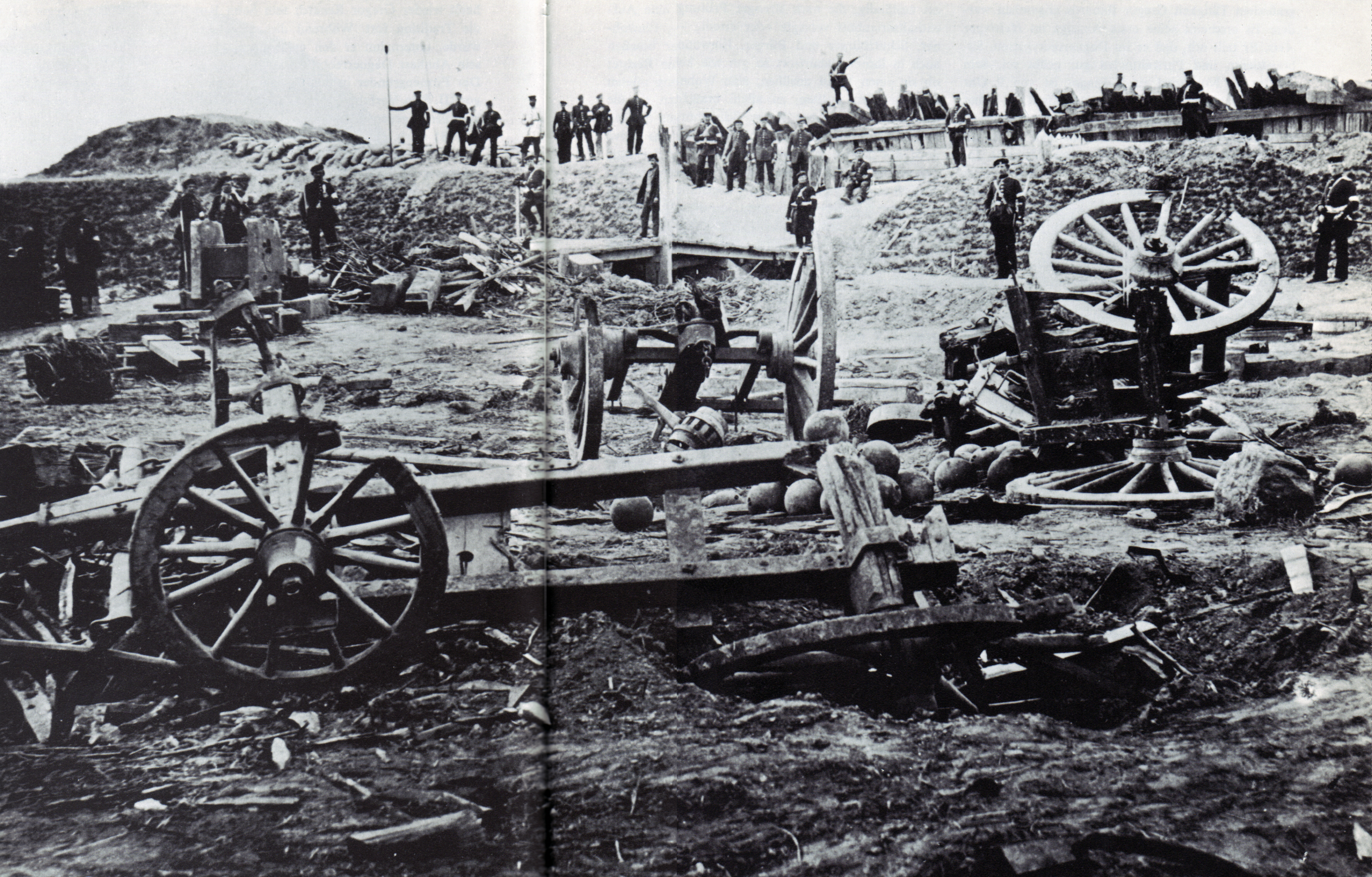
The battlefield photographed on 19 April, the day after the battle.

During the battle around 3,600 Danes and 1,200 Prussians were either killed, wounded or missing. A Danish official army casualty list at the time said 671 dead; 987 wounded, of whom 473 were captured; 3,131 unwounded captured and/or deserters; total casualties 4,789. The 2nd and 22nd Regiments lost the most. Also, the crew of the Danish naval ship Rolf Krake suffered one dead, 10 wounded. 263 Prussians were killed during the battle. Johannes Neilsen's The Danish German War 1864 (1991) provides the following: 808 dead, 909 wounded, 2,872 captured, and 215 missing for the Danes with 1,201 casualties including 263 deaths for the Prussians.

While the Battle of Dybbøl was a defeat for the Danes, the activities of the Rolf Krake along with other Danish naval actions during the conflict served to highlight the naval weakness of Prussia. In an attempt to remedy this, the Austro-Prussians dispatched a naval squadron to the Baltic, which was intercepted by the Danish Navy at the Battle of Helgoland.

A truce followed the battle from 12 May until 26 June, with negotiations beginning in London on a new border between Denmark and the German Confederation. Denmark wanted a border on the River Eider but this was rejected as unrealistic. The war then restarted. The inflexible attitude of the Danish government in London led to their diplomatic isolation at negotiations in Vienna, resulting in a peace treaty on 30 October 1864. The treaty turned the duchies of Schleswig and Holstein into an "Austro-Prussian condominium, under the joint sovereignty of the two states." The German chancellor, Otto von Bismarck, had taken one of the first steps toward launching the German Empire that would dominate continental Europe until World War I.

== Legacy ==
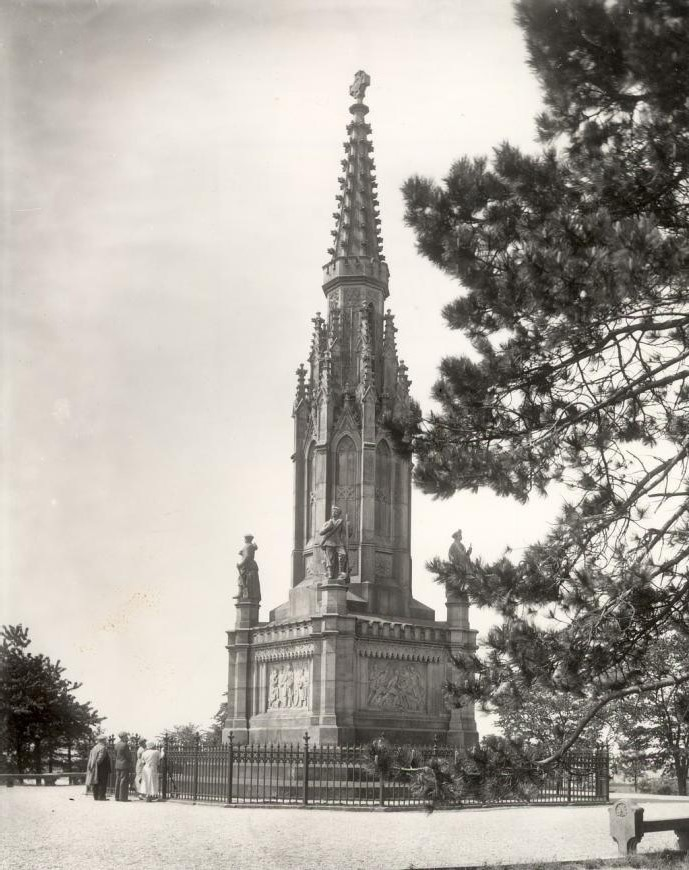
The Düppel-Denkmal c. 1910

A ceremony of national commemoration is held at Dybbøl on 18 April each year. Danish soldiers appear in period uniforms. The 140th anniversary (in 2004) was a special event in Denmark. Sociologists still refer to the Battle of Dybbøl when commenting on the relationship between Danes and Germans. The initial reaction in Denmark was difficult to accommodate psychologically. Contemporary newspapers did not blame the soldiers, but the army's return to Copenhagen received no cheering crowds or other acclamations as had occurred after the Danish victory in the First Schleswig War. Because the battlefield itself was annexed into the German Confederation, Danes were unable to access it. Immediately following the war, German monuments started being planned. Germans erected the 24-metre Düppel-Denkmal, along with a similar Alsen-Denkmal on the island of Als, to commemorate the battle on what was originally Danish redoubt 4, in the middle of the battlefield. The monument at Dybbøl was dedicated in eternal memory to the victorious fallen in the storming on the Dybbøl redoubts on 18 April 1864.

While the monument does not explicitly stress a German importance to the battle and depicts heroism on both sides, the monument has consistently been interpreted as a victory monument. While the architect may have intended the monument as dedicated to the fallen rather than victory, with no direct references to victory itself, both German and Danish commentators – even at the dedication of the monument – have viewed it as representing victory and the greatness of the German nation. German victory celebrations took place regularly at the monument, with the Kaiser visiting in 1890. Commemorations continued until 1914. German visitation to the battlefield was common, as the place was seen as one of the focal points for unification of the many German states. A large hotel was built near the site in 1885.

Four communal graves were established for the fallen soldiers. Markers placed in 1865 carry a text in German, stating "here rest [number] courageous Danes/Prussians". Officers were, over the years, further honoured with burial markers at different locations in the fortifications, with exception of Prussian Private Carl Klinke, who was made into a national hero. Carl Klinke (1840-1864) who is said to have run onto the redoubt carrying explosives and igniting them by the palisades thus killing himself and blowing a hole into the Danish redoubt, was immortalized in a poem written by Theodor Fontane (1819–1898). Composer Johann Gottfried Piefke (1815-1884) dedicated the Düppeler Sturmmarsch to this battle.

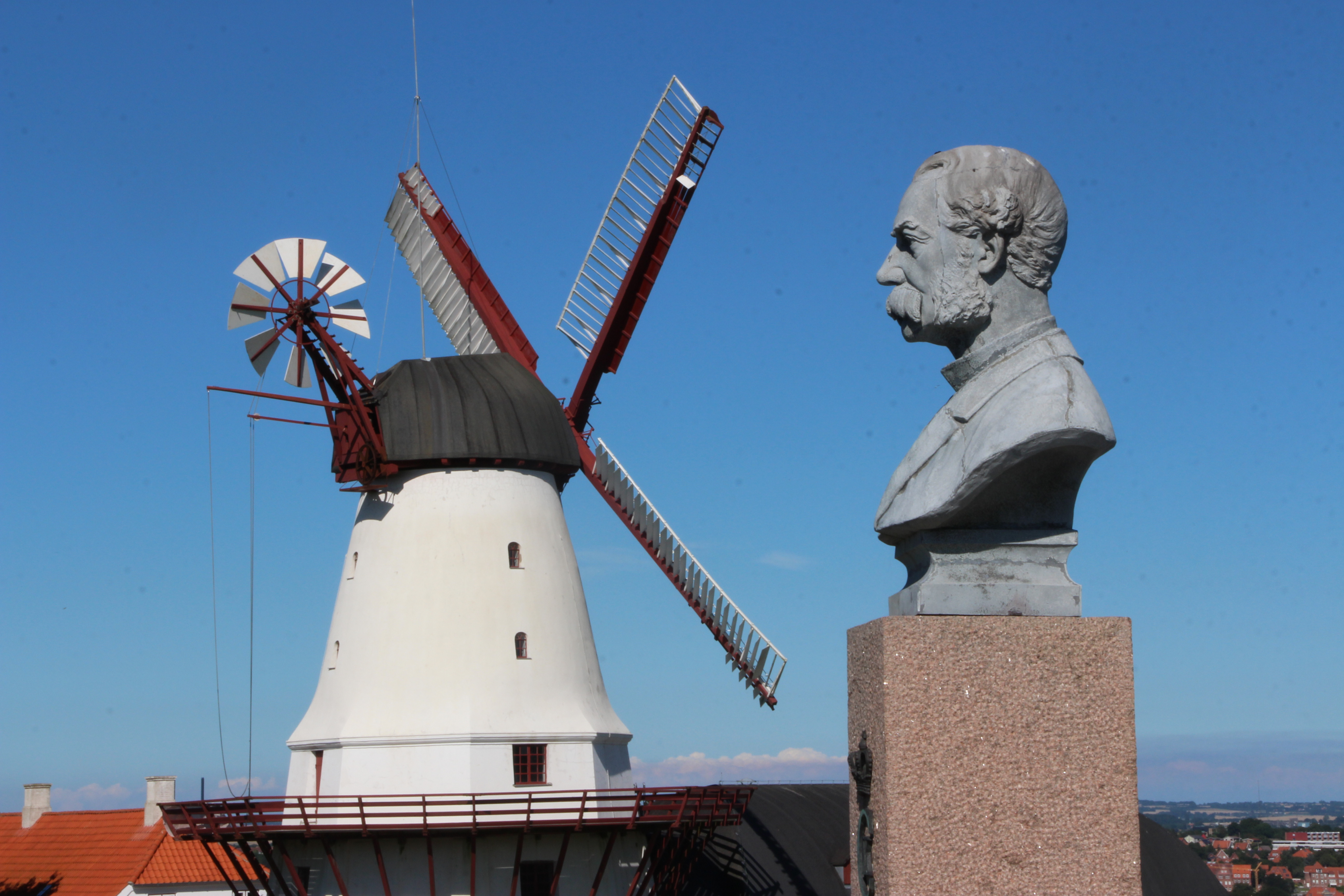
The Dybbøl Mill next to a bust of King Christian IX

The Dybbøl Mill, which had been destroyed during the 1849 battle on the site, rebuilt, and then destroyed again in 1864, was again rebuilt by its owners who had strong Danish sympathies. Danish visitors to the battlefield also visited the mill. Well known Danish author Holder Drachmann visited the battlefield in 1877 and wrote on his emotions felt there in a volume entitled Derovre fra Grænsen, Strejftog over det danske Termopylæ (Als-Dybbøl) [Over There from the Border. Wanderings over the Danish Termopylæ (Als- Dybbøl)]. The book became very popular; articulating the emotional essence of the place, it contributed to making the Dybbøl Windmill a Danish national symbol and memorial site. Much of the feelings expressed in Denmark of lost Schleswig land appeared in the late 1870s onwards.

The battlefield itself was returned to Denmark in consequence of internationally administered plebiscites following the Treaty of Versailles. Reunification was celebrated there on 11 July 1920 as a symbol of Danish nationalism; the Danish government also requested that the Düppel-Denkmal be moved to Germany, but was ignored. The battlefield was purchased following donations from across Denmark and donated to the Danish state as a national park in 1924. Further Danish remembrances are conducted regularly and at major anniversaries of the battle and of Northern Schleswig's reunification.

The German Düppel-Denkmal was destroyed after Germany's occupation of Denmark and the end of the Second World War on 13 May 1945, presumably by members of the resistance. The perpetrators were never identified, and this monument has not been rebuilt. The sister German monument on Als, the Alsen-Denkmal was destroyed in June 1945. Both monuments were buried in a gravel pit. Offers of a joint anniversary with Germany in 1966 were rejected, often explained by lingering resentment by the local population of Germany's conscription of Danes living in Schleswig during the First World War Since Danish accession to the European Union in 1973 and with the passage of time, the view of the battlefield as an exclusively Danish memorial has changed: German soldiers started participating in commemorations in 1998 and marched with Danish soldiers for the first time in 2011.

== In popular culture ==
- 1864 – 2014 Danish television historical drama
- In The Riddle of the Sands (1903, Erskine Childers), Chapter V, the protagonists of the novel visit a monument to the battle near Sonderburg. Character "Davies" speculates, "It was a landing in boats, I suppose".

== See also ==
- Schleswig-Holstein question
- History of Schleswig-Holstein

== Sources ==
- Tom Buk-Swienty (2016) 1864: The Forgotten War That Shaped Modern Europe (Profile Books) ISBN 978-1781252765
- Nick Svendsen (2010) First Schleswig-Holstein War 1848 (Helion and Company) ISBN 978-1906033446
