= Itsi Bitsi =

2014 Danish drama film

- Film poster
- Danish: Steppeulven
- Directed by: Ole Christian Madsen
- Written by: Bo Hr. Hansen; Ole Christian Madsen
- Produced by: Lars Bredo Rahbek
- Starring: Thure Lindhardt
- Cinematography: Jørgen Johansson
- Edited by: Søren B. Ebbe
- Music by: Henrik Lindstrand
- Release dates: 6 September 2014 (TIFF); 19 February 2015 (Denmark)
- Running time: 107 minutes
- Country: Denmark
- Language: Danish

Itsi Bitsi, also known as Steppeulven, is a 2014 Danish drama film directed by Ole Christian Madsen. It is a biopic of the band Steppeulvene. It was screened in the Contemporary World Cinema section at the 2014 Toronto International Film Festival.

Filming took place in a number of locations across Croatia, including Motovun, Pag, Zadar, and Zagreb.

== Cast ==
- Joachim Fjeldstrup as Eik Skaløe
- Thure Lindhardt as Eik's father
- Ola Rapace as Vincent
- Julia Ragnarsson as Majbritt
- Christian Gade Bjerrum as Christian Arnø
- Anette Støvelbæk as Eik's mother
- Marie Tourell Søderberg as Iben Nagel Rasmussen
- Johannes Nymark as Henrik
- Caspar Phillipson as Halfdan Rasmussen
- Joachim Fjelstrup as Eik Skaløe
