= Georg Gerlach =

Danish military officer

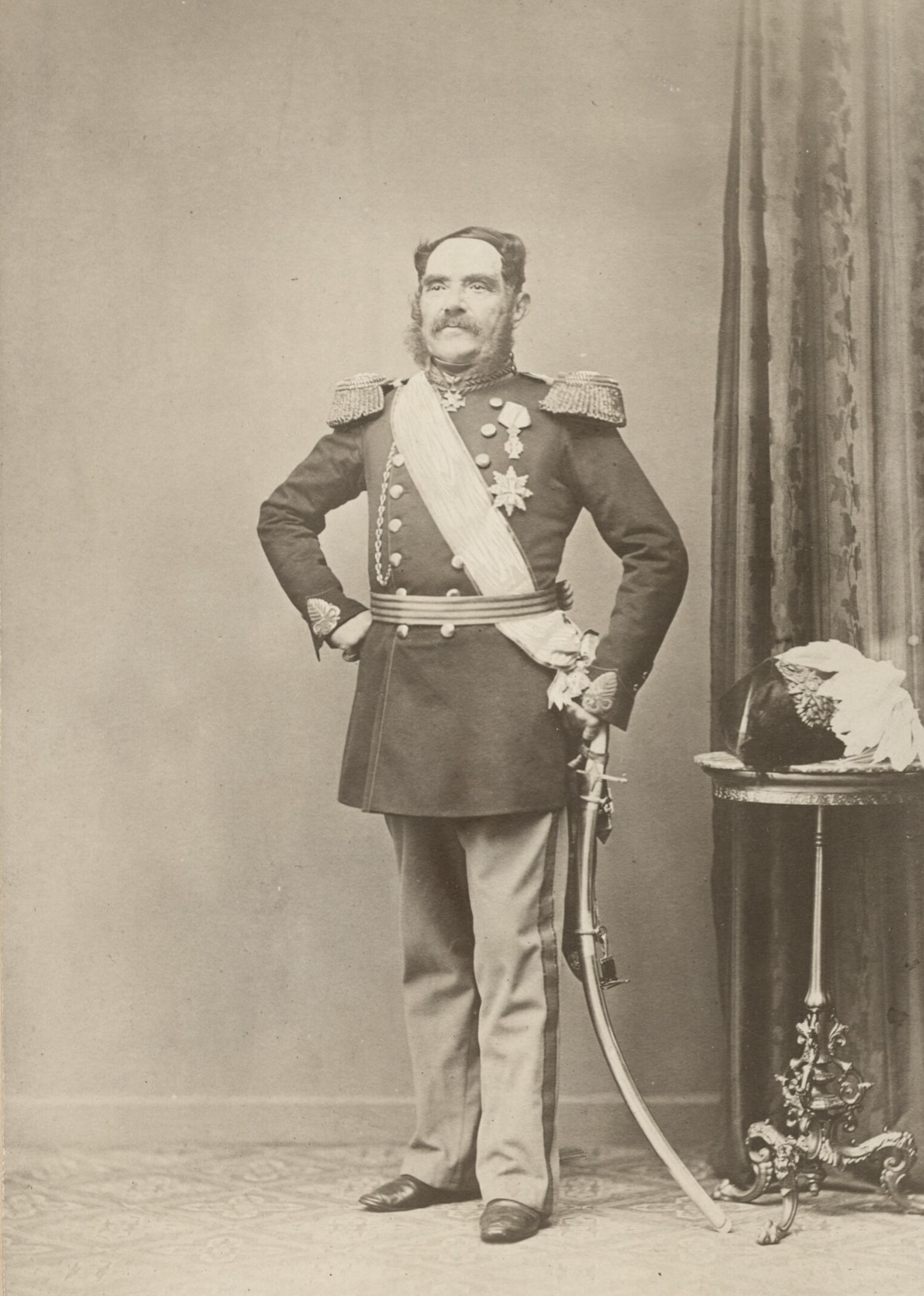
- Photograph of Gerlach in Danmarks Riges Historie by Adolf Ditlev Jørgensen
- Born: 31 August 1797; Egernførde, Duchy of Schleswig, Denmark–Norway
- Died: 7 March 1865 (aged 67); Copenhagen, Denmark
- Burial place: Garrison Cemetery, Copenhagen
- Spouse: Caroline Marie Kromayer (m. 1827; died 1846)
- Children: 8
- Military career
- Allegiance: Denmark-Norway; Denmark
- Branch: Royal Danish Army
- Service years: 1808–1864
- Rank: Lieutenant general
- Conflicts: First Schleswig War: Battle of Fredericia; Battle of Isted; Second Schleswig War: Battle of Mysunde; Battle of Dybbøl

Georg Daniel Gerlach (31 August 1797 – 8 March 1865) was a Danish officer. He was the son of Captain Molter Christoph Gerlach of the Schleswig Hunters Corps and Anna Sabine Magdalena née Boehn. In 1827 he married Caroline Marie Kromayer (1800-1846), who in the marriage gave birth to eight children, one of whom died in infancy.

== Military career ==
He was drafted into the military in December 1808 as a national casualty, and appointed second lieutenant in the Holstein infantry in 1813. In 1822 he became first lieutenant and in 1830 chief of staff. In 1842 he was appointed major and in 1848 lieutenant colonel. He participated in the First Schleswig War, where he excelled in the battles of Fredericia and Isted.

In 1850 he was appointed colonel and commander of the 6th Infantry Brigade. In 1851, he was Commander of the Anglia. In 1854 he became commander of the 1st Infantry Brigade in Copenhagen. In 1858 Gerlach became a member of the advisory committee of the Ministry of War and in 1859 he was appointed Inspector General of the Infantry.

When the Second Schleswig War broke out in 1864, he was given command of the 1st Division, which pushed the Prussians back at Mysunde on 2 February. He supported Christian de Meza's decision to evacuate the Danevirke position. When de Meza was dismissed as commander-in-chief of the army because of this decision, Gerlach was ordered, against his will, to take command.

He did not share the war ministry's position on how to conduct the war and had several clashes. He was opposed to defending the Dybbøl position, but was ordered by the ministry to keep it. After the loss of the Dybbøl position, Gerlach prepared to lead the defense further from Fredericia, but he was ousted by War Minister Carl Lundbye and ordered to evacuate Fredericia. Gerlach tried to change the decision, but he was deprived of the command, which instead went to General Peter Frederik Steinmann.

He then, at his own request, received the command of the 1st Division, which he retained the command of the war out. In December 1864 he retired, and the following year he died in Copenhagen.

Gerlach became a Knight of Dannebrog in 1836, the Dannebrogordenens Hæderstegn in 1849, Commander 1853, and received the Grand Cross in 1864. On 6 October 1850 he was awarded the Order of Saint Anna, 2nd class.

He was buried in Garrison Cemetery.

In Tom Buk-Swienty book Slagtbænk Dybbøl, Gerlach was assessed as "no strong leader".

In connection with the memorial services on 18 April 2014, descendants of Gerlach gave a journalist insight into documents that, among other things, showed that Gerlach was a stronger critic of government policy than people assumed; but for reasons of principle he chose to comply with the government's order to hold the Dybbøl position, even though he found it erroneous on the basis of a military assessment.
