= Steppeulvene =

Danish rock band

Steppeulvene (Danish language for The Steppe Wolves) was a Danish rock band which despite its short life has become the icon for the Danish hippie music scene. The name of the group was taken from the 1927 novel Steppenwolf by German Nobel laureate Hermann Hesse. Also in 1967, in California, the band Steppenwolf named itself after the novel.

Their only album Hip (1967) was the first rock album with original Danish lyrics, and has attained near-mythological status in the history of Danish rock.

The group was the result of a collaboration between lead singer Eik Skaløe, who had traveled in the Orient in the early 1960s and wrote the Bob Dylan-inspired, highly symbolic and almost surreal lyrics, and Stig Møller (guitar, vocal), who wrote the drawling, psychedelic, folk-influenced music. The other members were Søren Seirup (bass) and Preben Devantier (drums).

A tour in October 1967 came to a chaotic end when a concert was cut short by the police and the group members were arrested for cannabis use. Shortly after being released, Eik Skaløe went on a journey to Afghanistan/Nepal (on the so-called "hippie trail") and was found dead outside the city of Ferozepore near the Indian/Pakistani border in October 1968, apparently after a drug-induced suicide. Back in Denmark the rest of the group attempted to carry on, but, lacking the characteristic Skaløe as a front figure, quickly dissolved.

Steppeulven is a 2014 film about them.

== Discography ==
- 1967: Hip (re-released in 2015, No. 4 on Tracklisten)
- 1967: Du skal ud, hvor du ikke kan bunde / Flip
