= Selk, Germany =

Selk
- Municipality
- Coat of arms

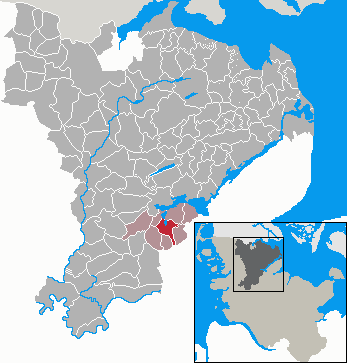
- Location of Selk within Schleswig-Flensburg district
- Interactive map of Selk
- Location within Germany Location within Schleswig-Holstein
- Coordinates: 54°28′N 9°34′E
- Country: Germany
- State: Schleswig-Holstein
- District: Schleswig-Flensburg
- Municipal assoc.: Haddeby

Government
  - Mayor: Siegrid Bärenz

Area
  - Total: 10.07 km^{2} (3.89 sq mi)
- Elevation: 19 m (62 ft)

Population (2025-12-31)
  - Total: 799
  - Density: 79.3/km^{2} (206/sq mi)
- Time zone: UTC+01:00 (CET)
  - Summer (DST): UTC+02:00 (CEST)
- Postal codes: 24884
- Dialling codes: 04621
- Vehicle registration: SL
- Website: www.haddeby.de

Selk (German pronunciation: [zɛlk]) is a municipality in the district of Schleswig-Flensburg, in Schleswig-Holstein, Germany.
