= Federal execution =

Measures against individual states if they violate federal rules

The term federal execution (German: Bundesexekution) refers to the right of a confederation or federation to act militarily against individual member states if they violate duties resulting from membership. The term "Reichsexekution" is also used in Germany depending on the respective state name.

== German Confederation ==
The German Confederation (1815–1866) was obliged to proceed against the government of a member state by means of a Bundesexekution, insofar as this was contrary to the provisions of the German Confederation Constitution or other Federal decrees.

The foundations of the Confederation were Article 31 of the Vienna Final Act and the Execution Order of 1820. In order to force a state to comply with its obligations, the following measures were envisaged:

- Military occupation of a state
- Assumption of the governmental power to depose a ruling prince and
- Abolition of constitutional provisions which violate federal law

A Federal Commissioner was appointed who was responsible for implementing these measures.

Federal executions in the German Confederation:

- In 1830 against Brunswick because its Duke Charles II refused to recognise the constitution adopted under his guardian, the British King George IV.
- In 1834 against Frankfurt in the wake of the Frankfurter Wachensturm (English: Change of the Frankfurt guard house).
- The federal execution against the Duchies of Holstein and Saxe-Lauenburg from 1863 because of the inclusion of Schleswig into the Danish constitution, from which the Second Schleswig War resulted.
- In 1866 against Prussia on the occasion of the dispute over the administration of Schleswig-Holstein. The following Austro-Prussian War for supremacy of the German Confederation led to the dissolution of the Confederation.

The federal execution was to be distinguished from federal intervention which was not directed against the government of a member state, but against anti-German movements and served to secure the monarchical legitimists and public peace. It was also necessary to distinguish the Bundeskrieg (Federal War) in order to ward off attacks by foreign powers.

== Switzerland ==
In Switzerland, federal execution describes federal compulsory measures against individual cantons, if they do not comply with their federal obligations. The foundations of this were Articles 173 and 186 of the Federal Constitution. Federal execution may also have meant the fulfilment of duty by the Confederation at the expense of the canton (replacement action) or temporary suspension of subsidies. The last measure would then have to have been a military action against the canton. The federal execution was decided by the Federal Assembly and the implementation of it was the responsibility of the Federal Council. The following prerequisites must have been cumulative for the Federal Security to implement them:

1. violation of federal obligations by cantons
2. forced threat
3. warning
4. deadlines.

In addition, a canton could appeal to the federal court before the execution, if it saw itself violated by the covenant.

The Swiss Confederation was differentiated from the Federal Intervention in Switzerland. The latter served the protection of cantonal organs against turmoil and disturbance in accordance to Article 52 of the Federal Constitution and may have been connected with the use of military troops. Today, the principle that cantonal police officers are deployed and army units of the Confederation are to be deployed on a subsidiary basis in case of urgent need. In the country-wide general strike of 1918, different methods were used. Some army units serving in the First World War were used against striking workers, which ultimately also led to some casualties. It was an official service, whilst maintaining cantonal sovereignty, not a federal intervention.

Ten federal interventions have been carried out since 1848, nine of them during the 19th century, the tenth during the unrest in Geneva in 1932.

== Used terms ==
Whilst the federal execution in the German Confederation was directed against a member state, which did not want to fulfil its obligations, the federal intervention was a help for the member state that was beset by unrest which it could not itself suppress.

The federal execution was the legal equivalent to the Reichsexekution in the Holy Roman Empire and in the German Empire. In the Basic Law for the Federal Republic of Germany of 1949, the term "Bundeszwang" (English: federal pressure) is used. Article 155 of the Constitution of Spain is based on the provision in the German Basic Law (article 37) almost verbatim. However, unlike in Spain where Article 155 was invoked in the 2017–2018 Spanish constitutional crisis, Article 37 of the Basic Law has never been invoked.

== Web sources ==
- Hans-Urs Wili: "Bundesinterventionen" in German, French and Italian in the online Historical Dictionary of Switzerland.
