= Tom Buk-Swienty =

Danish journalist, historian and writer

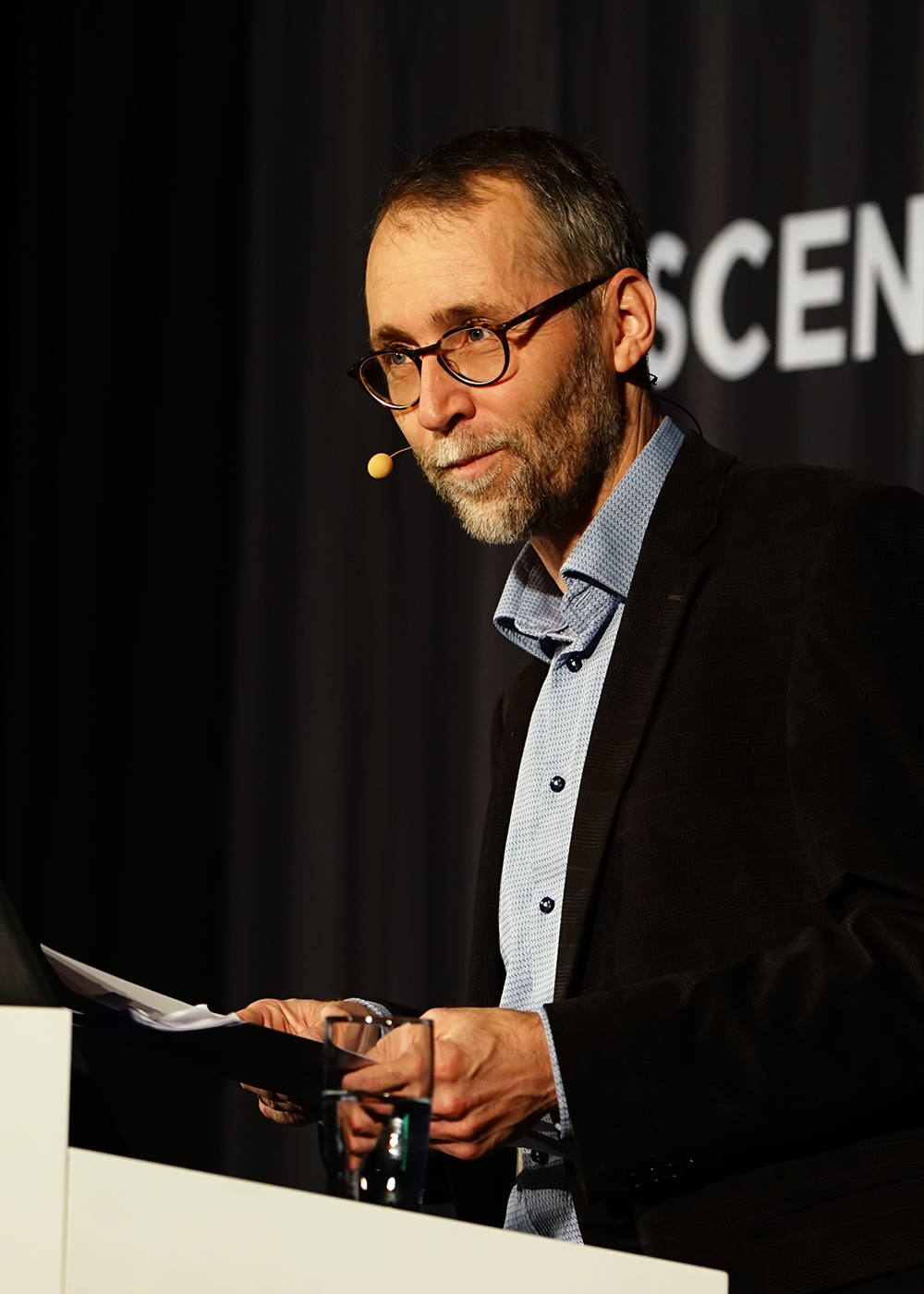
- Buk-Swienty in 2016
- Born: 19 July 1966 (age 60); Eutin, Germany
- Occupations: Historian, journalist, author
- Writing career
- Notable work: 1864
- Website: buk-swienty.com

Tom Buk-Swienty (born 19 July 1966 in Eutin) is a Danish historian, journalist and author, known for his work on the Second Schleswig War.

Buk-Swienty was raised in Sønderborg, Denmark. He holds degrees in history and American Studies from the University of Copenhagen and the University of California. During 1994–2005, he served as the American correspondent for the Danish periodical Weekendavisen and also as a lecturer at the University of Southern Denmark in Odense until 2010. He is now an independent author and since 2014 has been an adjunct professor in history at University of Southern Denmark.

His writing career began during his US stay where he wrote books based on his knowledge of America. After his return to Denmark, he began studying the war of 1864, and he then wrote the first volume of his two-volume work on that conflict. The first book was well received and received several awards, which spawned the second volume of the work two years later. In 2013 he published the first volume of a two-volume biography of Wilhelm Dinesen, Karen Blixen's father, "Captain Dinesen. Fire and blood" and the second volume, "Captain Dinesen. Till death do us part", published in October 2014.

== Bibliography ==
- Amerika Maxima (rejsefortælling, 2002)
- Den ideelle amerikaner (biography of Jacob A. Riis, 2005)
- Det sidste hus på prærien (reporting, 2006)
- Købmændenes historie (together with Søren Mørch, 2007)
- Ren kjærlighed kan jo aldrig dø (redaktion af Jacob A. Riis' dagbøger, 2007)
- Slagtebænk Dybbøl (2008)
- The Other Half: The Life of Jacob Riis and the World of Immigrant America translated by Annette Buk-Swienty (W. W. Norton & Company 2008)
- Dommedag Als (2010)
- Kaptajn Dinesen - Ild og blod (2013)
- Kaptajn Dinesen - Til døden os skiller (2014)
- 1864: The Forgotten War that Shaped Modern Europe translated by Annette Buk-Swienty (Profile Books) (2014)
- Det Ensomme Hjerte (Politikens Forlag) (2016)

== Prizes and awards ==
- Årets historiske bog, 2008 (for Slagtebænk Dybbøl)
- Årets faglitterære pris, 2009
- Søren Gyldendal-prisen, 2010
- Læsernes Bogpris, 2011
