= Max Müller (Danish army officer) =

Danish military officer (1808–1884)

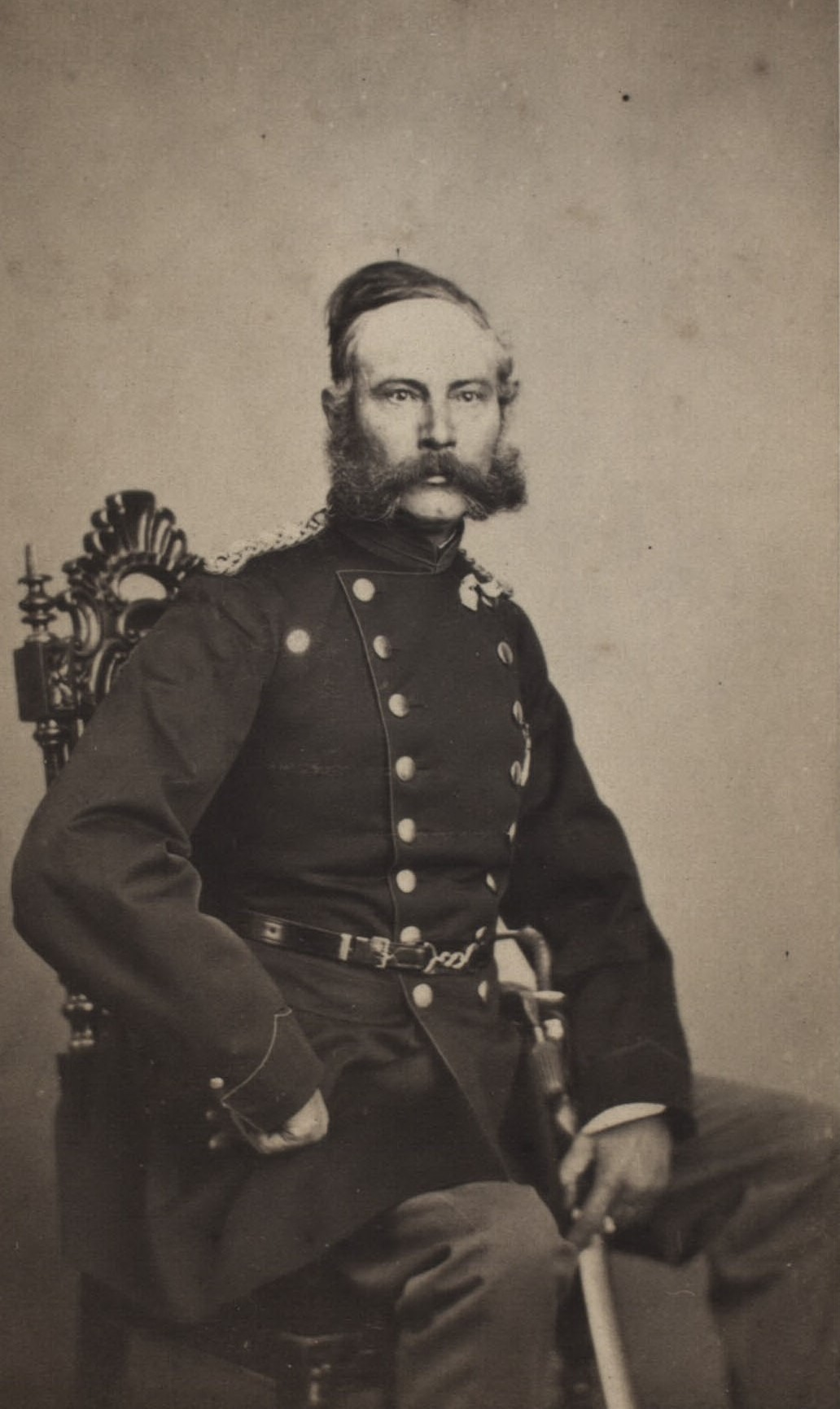
- Born: Carl Philip Friedemann Maximilian Müller; 22 October 1808; Fredericia, Fredericia Municipality, Denmark-Norway
- Died: 28 October 1884 (aged 76); Frederiksberg, Frederiksberg Municipality, Denmark
- Alma mater: Royal Danish Military Academy
- Spouse: Emilie Thorsen (m. 1852)
- Military career
- Allegiance: Denmark
- Branch: Royal Danish Army
- Service years: 1827–1879
- Rank: General
- Conflicts: First Schleswig War; Bov; Schleswig; Nybøl; Dybbøl; Battle of Isted; Second Schleswig War; Selk and Königshügel; Battle of Sankelmark
- Awards: Knight of the Dannebrog

Carl Philip Friedemann Maximilian Müller, also known as Max Müller (22 October 1808 – 28 October 1884) was a Danish military officer who served in the First and Second Schleswig Wars.

== Early military career ==
Müller was born to Christian Vilhelm Carl Müller and Helene F. Strickenbach on 22 October 1808. His father was a captain in the Funen Infantry Regiment who died in 1820 when Müller was 12. His mother was from Egernførde and later moved with her five children, of whom Max was the eldest, to Rendsborg. In 1822, Müller joined the Royal Danish Military Academy and in 1825, after earning the officer's degree, became second lieutenant in the Holstein Infantry Regiment, where he did not serve until New Year's Day 1827, as he was previously first corporal in the Cadet Corps and royal page. The regiment, which in 1842 was renamed the 15th Battalion, was stationed in Rendsburg, and he remained there both as a first lieutenant in 1834 and as a characterized captain in 1841. Müller read a lot, and strengthened his body with long walks and varios weapons exercises. It was reported that if someone stepped too close to him or spoke ill of his country, he gave the recipient the choice between a duel, or apologizing.

== First Schleswig War ==
In 1846, Müller became a captain 2nd class and was transferred to Copenhagen as company commander of the 4th Battalion, and then went to the field in 1848. It did not take long before he earned a name as one of the army's most capable officers, leading his company with distinction at Bov, Schleswig, Nybøl and Dybbøl. He was stationed at Sundeved in April 1849 and later fought at Isted. In 1849, he was employed by Krabbes brigade. In the Battle at Vedelspang, he was the head of two companies that recaptured the Katbæk Forest from insurgents with a bayonet charge that caused his opponents to flee. Ever after that day, he retained a great love for the bayonet and had the troops under him practise bayonet attacks. He became a Knight of Dannebrog in 1848.

After the war, Müller joined the 1st Reinforcement Battalion and several divisions and in 1852 the 13th Battalion. In 1853 he became a major in 1853 and received command of the 1st Battalion in Rendsburg the following year. In 1857 he was promoted to lieutenant colonel. He spent nine years there and hardened his Copenhageners with strenuous exercises. He rose to prominence in the 1850s, when his study of tactics made him one of the first to recognize the advantages of the company column, whose adoption he helped to advance significantly. In 1858, he became a Knight of Dannebrog.

== Second Schleswig War ==
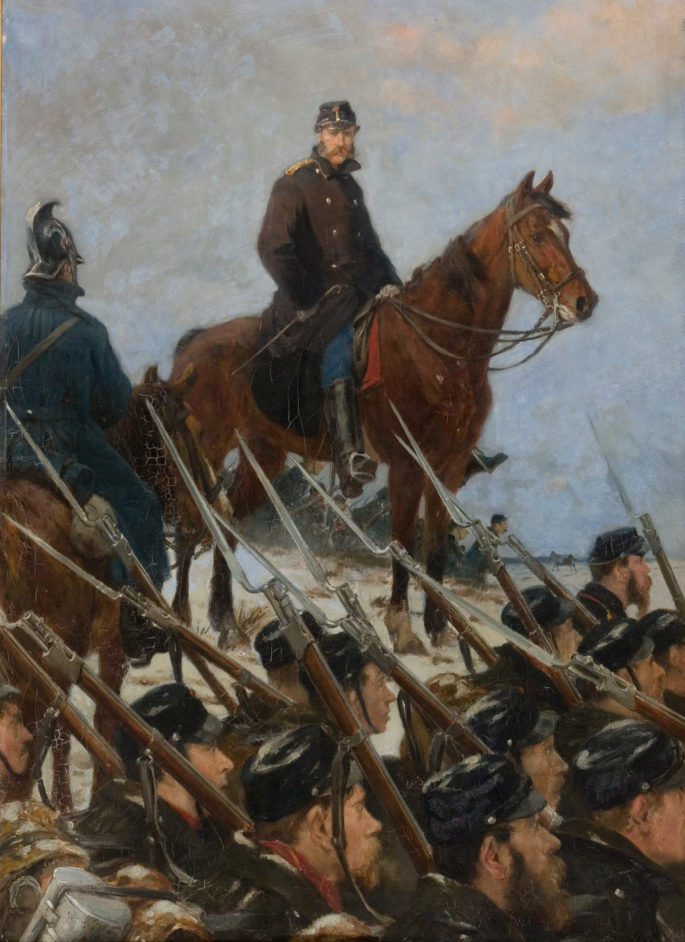
Otto Bache, Colonel Max Müller at Sankelmark Lake at 6 February 1864, 1886, Ribe Kunstmuseum

When the army was mobilized in the autumn of 1863, it was initially expected that Müller would command the 1st Regiment. Instead, he was appointed colonel and commander of the 7th Brigade, consisting of the 1st and 11th Regiments. The brigade came up to Dannevirke, and two of its battalions took part in the battle at Selk and Königshügel on February 3. When the army withdrew from Dannevirke on the 5th, he assumed command of the 3rd Division under General Peter Frederik Steinmann. Comprising the 7th and 8th Brigades, the division was tasked with covering the retreat, and the two brigades alternated in holding the position closest to the advancing Prussian and Austrian forces.

At Sankelmark, Müller was ordered to position his brigade so the 8th Brigade could pass through and to stop the pursuing Austrians. This maneuver triggered the Battle of Sankelmark, during which Müller demonstrated his finest military qualities. "It is not enough that I await the enemy, I must attack him myself," he stated upon receiving the order to take up the post. He led both the 1st Regiment, which was at the forefront, and then the 11th Regiment. Denmark lost a total of 17 officers, 28 non-commissioned officers and 783 men, of whom 568 were captured. The Austrian losses amounted to 30 officers and 403 men.

Later, the brigade accompanied General Cai Hegermann-Lindencrone's division north and then fought at Vejle, but after that Müller did not engage in battle again. During the armistice after the defeat at Dybbøl, Müller became head of a newly formed brigade, the landing brigade, which was stationed in Funen.

=== Postwar life ===
After the war, in which he was honoured with the Commander's Cross of 1st Dannebrog in 1864, Müller continued as brigade commander of the 2nd Infantry Brigade, and became a member of the Defense Commission in 1866. However, he had little influence, as he was far more adept at commanding than at negotiating. Following the implementation of the Army Act of 1867, he was appointed general and commander of the 1st Zealand Brigade. In this role he ruled with an iron hand and devoted himself tirelessly to improving the fighting skills of his troops. In 1870 he became head of the Camp Division at Hald, and in 1875 he was awarded the Grand Cross of the Dannebrog. In 1879, age compelled him to retire from military service. He was aware of his own limitations, as is evident from what he wrote in the Journal of War Administration in 1865:

When one represents us the place where, and the time when we would kill for, then we must do it in such a manner that we crushes all that is against us.

He died on 28 October 1884 in Frederiksberg and was buried at the Frederiksberg Ældre Kirkegård. His wife was Emilie Thorsen, daughter of merchant Gottborg Thorsen in Flensburg, whom he had married 11 September 1852.

== Legacy ==
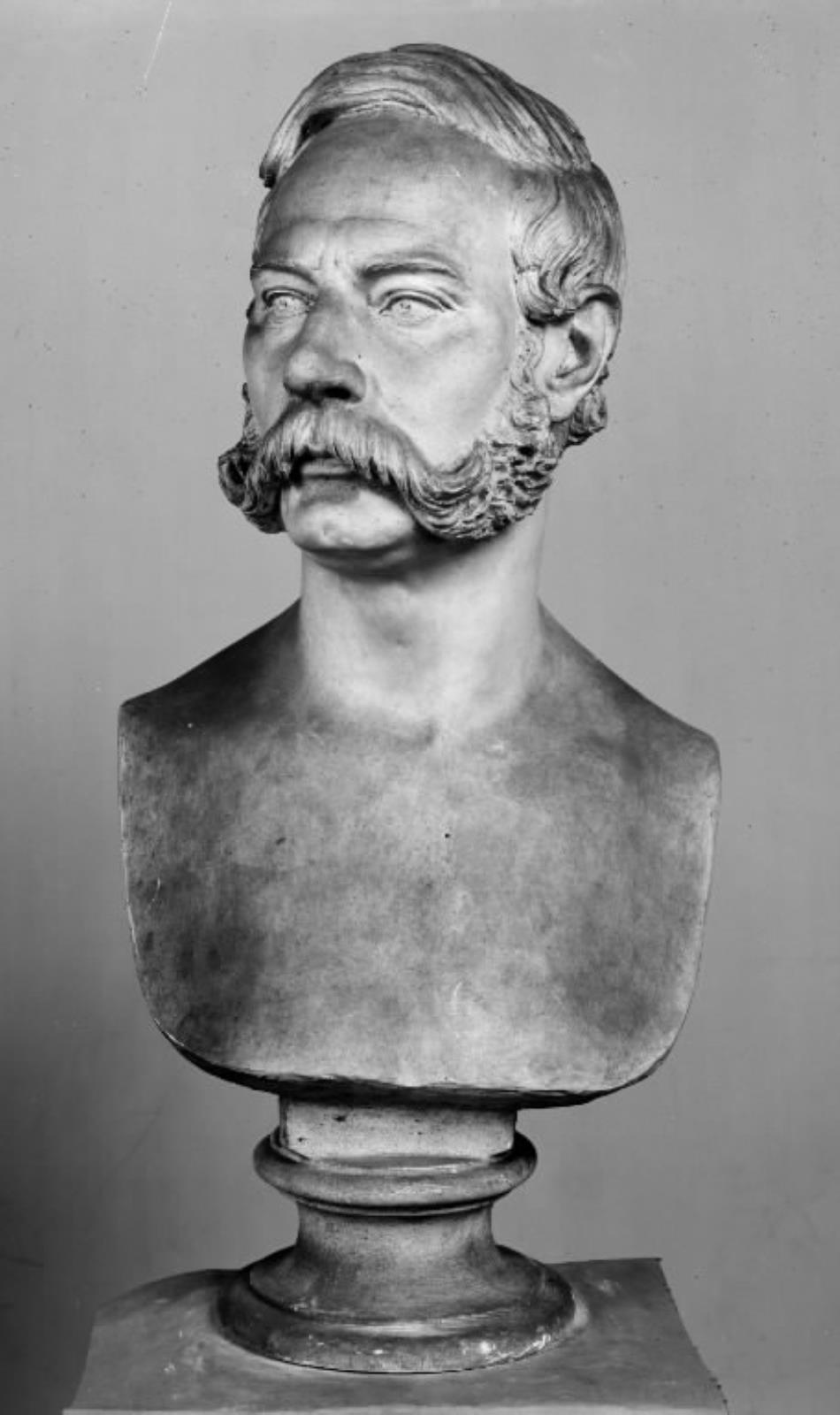
Bust of Müller by Herman Wilhelm Bissen (1865).

Max Müller is depicted on a painting from Sankelmark by Otto Bache in 1887 at the Frederiksborg Museum, reproduced in woodcut by Hans Peter Hansen and by Niels Simonsen in 1864. There was also a lithograph and woodcut in 1868 and 1879 and was portrayed in the stone engraving titled Fædrelandsslykke in 1886.

In the TV series 1864, Müller is portrayed by Rasmus Bjerg.
