= Funen Life Regiment =

- Fynske Livregiment
- Active: 1614–1991
- Country: Denmark
- Branch: Royal Danish Army
- Garrison: Odense Kaserne
- Motto: Fast i nød (Firm under distress)
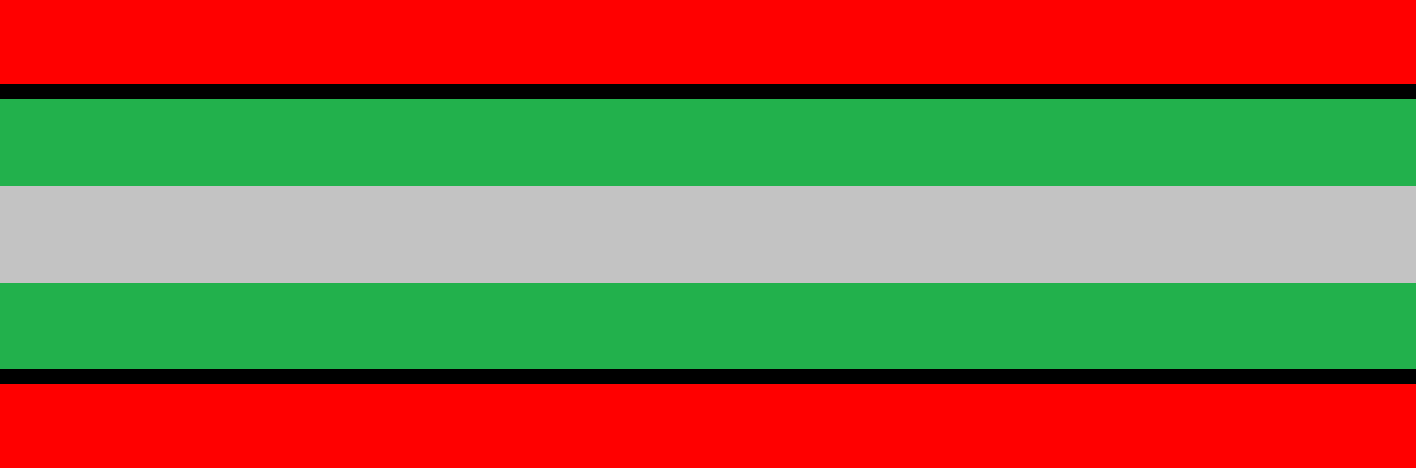
- Regimental belt
- March: Kronens Regiments Geschwindt-March (The Crown's Regiment's Geschwindt-March)
- Campaign streamer: "Lutter am Barenberg 1626, Wismar 1675, Christianstad 1677–78" and "Stralsund 1715, Dybbøl 1848, Isted 1850, Dybbøl 1864"

The Funen Life Regiment (Danish: Fynske Livregiment) was an infantry regiment of the Royal Danish Army. On 1 November 1991 it was merged with the King's Jutlandic Regiment of Foot, into Slesvigske Fodregiment.

== History ==
It was one of the oldest regiments in the Danish army and could trace its history back to 1614 when it was raised under the name Fynske Fenle Knægte af Jydske Regiment Landsfolk. The Regiment participated in all Danish wars since 1625, including Torstenson War (1643–1645) Northern Wars (1658–1660), Scanian War (1675–1679), Great Northern War (1700), Great Northern War (1709–1720), Slaget på Reden (1801), Gunboat War (1807–1814), First Schleswig War (1848–1850) and Second Schleswig War (1864). It was furthermore in foreign war service during 1689–1714. The regimental flag has the battle honours Lutter am Barenberg 1626, Wismar 1675, Christianstad 1677–78, Stralsund 1715, Dybbøl 1848, Isted 1850 and Dybbøl 1864.

== Organisation ==
Disbanded units

- 1st battalion (I/FLR), raised 1961, disbanded 1990. Mechanized infantry battalion.
  - Headquarters Company
  - 1st Armored Infantry Company
  - 2nd Armored Infantry Company
  - (blue) 3rd Tank Squadron (Along with from 1974 to 1981)
  - 4th Motorised Infantry Company
- 2nd battalion (II/FLR), raised 1961, disbanded 1990. Infantry battalion.
  - Headquarters Company
  - 1st Motorised Infantry Company
  - 2nd Motorised Infantry Company
  - 3rd Motorised Infantry Company
- 3rd battalion (III/FLR), raised 1961, disbanded 1990. Infantry battalion.
  - Headquarters Company
  - 1st Infantry Company
  - 2nd Infantry Company
  - 3rd Infantry Company
- 4th battalion (IV/FLR), raised 1961, disbanded 1990. Motorised infantry battalion.
  - Headquarters Company
  - 1st Motorised Infantry Company
  - 2nd Motorised Infantry Company
  - 3rd Motorised Infantry Company
  - 4th Tank Destroyer Squadron

== Names of the regiment ==
Names
Fyenske Kompagni af Jyske Regiment Knægte	Funen Company from Jutlandic Regiment Knaves	17 November 1614	–	1661
Fyenske Kompagni af Jydske Landregiment	Funen Company from Jutlandic Land Regiment	17 November 1614	–	1663
Fyenske Landregiment til Fods	Funen Land Regiment on Foot	1661	–	1679
Fyenske nationale Regiment	Funen National Regiment	1663	–	1680
Fyenske Regiment	Funen Regiment	1679	–	1729
Prins Frederiks Regiment	Prince Frederick's Regiment	1729	–	1730
Fyenske geworbne Regiment	Funen Recruited Regiment	1730	–	1749
Kronprins Christians Regiment	Crown Prince Christian's Regiment	1749	–	1766
Kongens Regiment	The King's Regiment	1766	–	1808
Kronens Regiment	The Crown's Regiment	1808	–	1839
3. Livregiment til Fods	3rd Life Regiment on Foot	1839	–	1842
4. Linie Infanteribataillon	4th Line Infantry Battalion	1842	–	1860
4. Infanteribataillon	4th Infantry Battalion	1860	–	1863
4. Infanteriregiment	4th Infantry Regiment	1863	–	1865
4. Infanteribataillon	4th Infantry Battalion	1865	–	1867
4. Bataillon	4th Battalion	1867	–	1951
6. Regiment	6th Regiment	1 November 1951	–	31 October 1961
Fynske Livregiment	Funen Life Regiment	1 November 1961	–	1 November 1991

== Standards ==
Historical standards of the regiment

Crown Prince Christian's Regiment
(1749–1766)

The King's Regiment
(1790–1808)

4th Battalion
(1912–1947)
