= Frederik Læssøe =

Danish military officer (1811–1850)

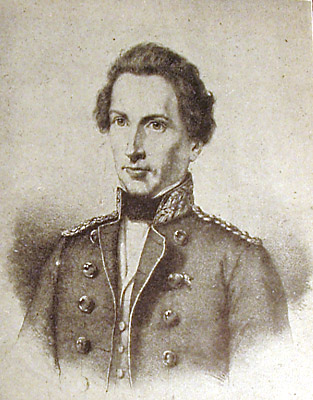
- Born: September 23, 1811; Copenhagen, Denmark-Norway
- Died: June 25, 1850 (aged 38); Grydeskov, Schleswig, Denmark
- Military career
- Allegiance: Denmark
- Branch: Danish Army
- Service years: 1830–1850
- Conflicts: First Schleswig War: Battle of Bov; Battle of Nybøl; Battle of Dybbøl; Battle of Kolding; Battle of Isted †

Werner Hans Frederik Abrahamson Læssøe (1811–1850) was a Danish officer known for his service in the First Schleswig War. He was the son of Margrethe Juliane Signe Læssøe and the brother of the priest Kristian Frederik Læssøe, the painter Thorald Læssøe and the numismatist Ludvig Læssøe.

== Biography ==
Læssøe became a lieutenant in an infantry regiment in 1830, was a student at the War College in 1832–1836 and was then employed in the general staff, where he was promoted to captain in 1842. For several years he was engaged in measurement and mapping work, which in recent times benefited Hedeselskabet's water supply plans, and served 1844–1845 as a teacher at the war academy, but was removed from this place, because his excessive independent ideas made him less popular with foremen, especially as he was politically leaning towards the National Liberal Party.

At the outbreak of First Schleswig War, Læssøe was chief of staff at the army command. He participated in the battles at Bov, Nybøl and Dybbøl Banke. On this occasion, Læssøe came into conflict with the Minister of War, who questioned the competence of the army's leadership. And as a result of the Defeat at Egernførde, the hunt for a scapegoat began. Minister of War Hansen then used the defeat to remove the commander of the high command, General Christoph von Krogh and his chief of staff Frederik Læssøe.

But when General Olaf Rye was given the task of leading the withdrawal of the Danish army in 1849, he got Læssøe with him in his staff, and he participated in the Battle of Kolding . Læssøe was appointed colonel in 1850 and led the 12th battalion in the Battle of Isted, where he fell during the fighting. He was buried in Flensburg.

Læssøesgade in both Aarhus, Copenhagen and Læssøegade in Kolding is named after him.

== Bibliography ==
- Biografi i Dansk biografisk leksikon
- Hans Christian Bjerg/Ole L. Frantzen (2005). Danmark i krig. Gyldendals Bogklubber/Politikens Forlag. ISBN 87-03-00990-4.

== See also ==
- H.C. Andersen was a close friend of Læssøe and his family. See his memorial poem in Kalliope.
