= Hans Hedemann =

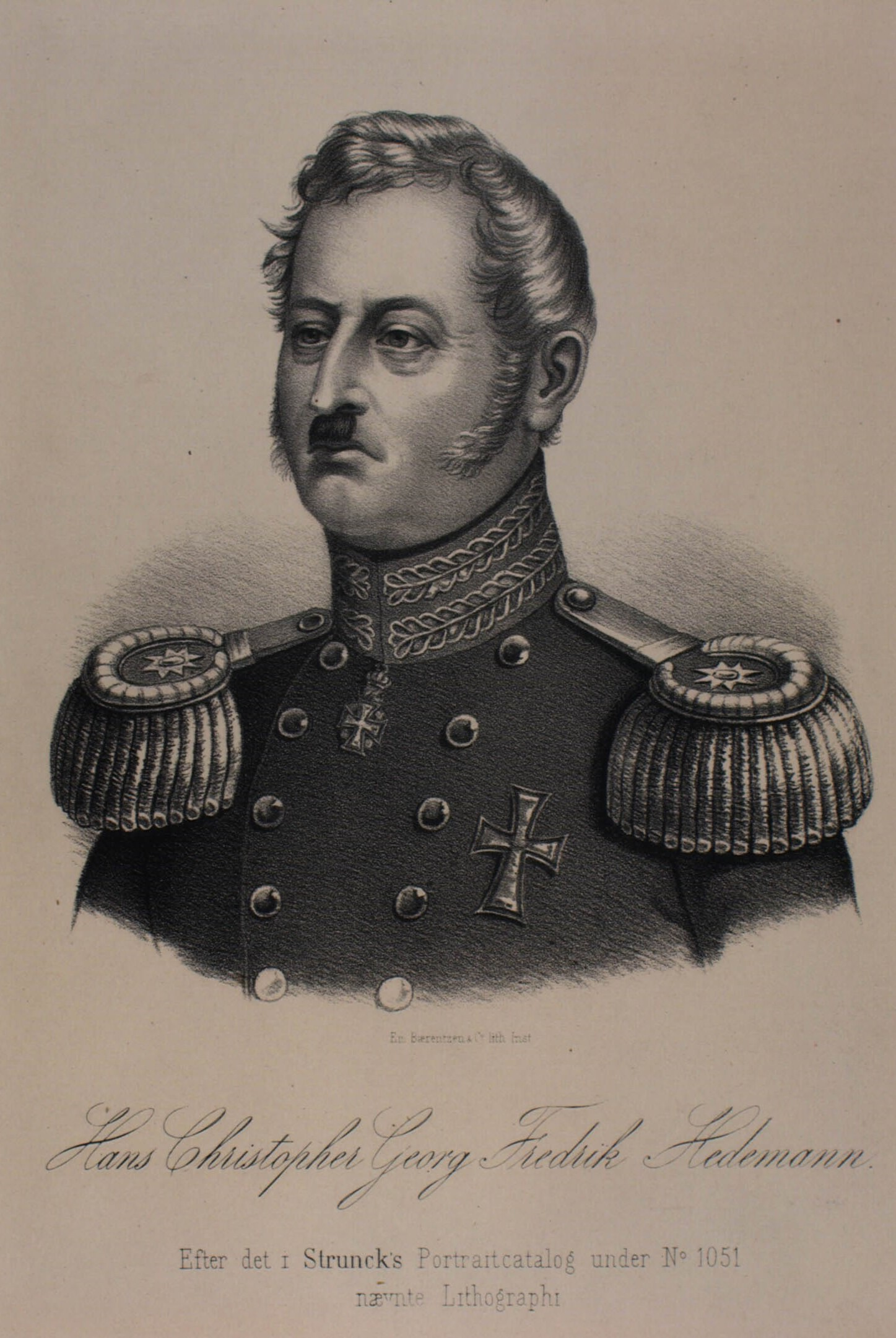
- Born: Hans Christopher Georg Friederich Hedemann; 7 July 1792; Flensburg, Schleswig, Denmark-Norway
- Died: 31 May 1859 (aged 66); Copenhagen, Denmark
- Military career
- Allegiance: Denmark-Norway; Denmark
- Branch: Danish Army
- Service years: 1803–1854
- Commands: 1st Jutland Infantry Regiment
- Conflicts: First Schleswig War: Battle of Nybøl; Battle of Dybbøl
- Awards: Order of the Dannebrog

Hans Christopher Georg Friederich Hedemann (1792–1859) was a Danish officer who became lieutenant general in the Danish army.

== Biography ==
Hedemann joined the Danish Cadet Corps before 1803. In 1808 he gained senior service as ensign, in 1809 became lieutenant and first lieutenant and in 1819, Chief of Staff. In 1811 he joined the 1st Jutland Infantry Regiment, where he was appointed captain in 1820. In 1832 he reached the seniority of a major and was finally promoted to major in 1836. During the reorganization of the army in 1842 he became lieutenant colonel and commander of the 10th battalion, in 1846 commander of the 1st Jäger Corps and commander of the Copenhagen Castle. On the New Year of 1847 he was given the character of a colonel.

When the First Schleswig War broke out in the spring of 1848, Minister of War Anton Frederik Tscherning appointed the relatively young colonel general and soon afterwards major general. He was given supreme command of the Danish army, with General Læssøe serving as chief of staff. Hedemann and Læssøe had a good relationship, although Hedemann often made decisions based on the situation and without consulting Læssøe or Tscherning. However, this approach proved itself in the battles at Bov and Schleswig on 9 and 23 April. Hedemann's relationship with War Minister Tscherning was problematic, however, as he found it difficult to give Hedemann a wide margin of decision-making.

After the Battle of Schleswig and the defeat in the battle near Oeversee, Tscherning dispatched the Colonel on the General Staff and later Minister of War Christian Frederik von Hansen to the Army High Command, with the authority to intervene to the extent necessary if the army command did not act in Tscherning's direction. Hansen initially saw no reason to intervene and subsequently took over command of the parts of the Danish army that had returned to Alsen. Hedemann was ordered to take command of the one to Funen to take over disembarked army parts. Since these parts of the army were much smaller, Hedemann protested against this regulation and threatened to resign. In May the Army High Command and the War Ministry agreed to take the offensive again with the troops on Als and to attack the Sundewitt Peninsula, which was occupied by the Germans . Before that, Tscherning sent his adjutant Johannes Harbou to the army headquarters, but he did not intervene in the preparations for the attack. As a result, the fights at Nybøl on 28 May and Dybbøl on June 5 were successful for the Danes.

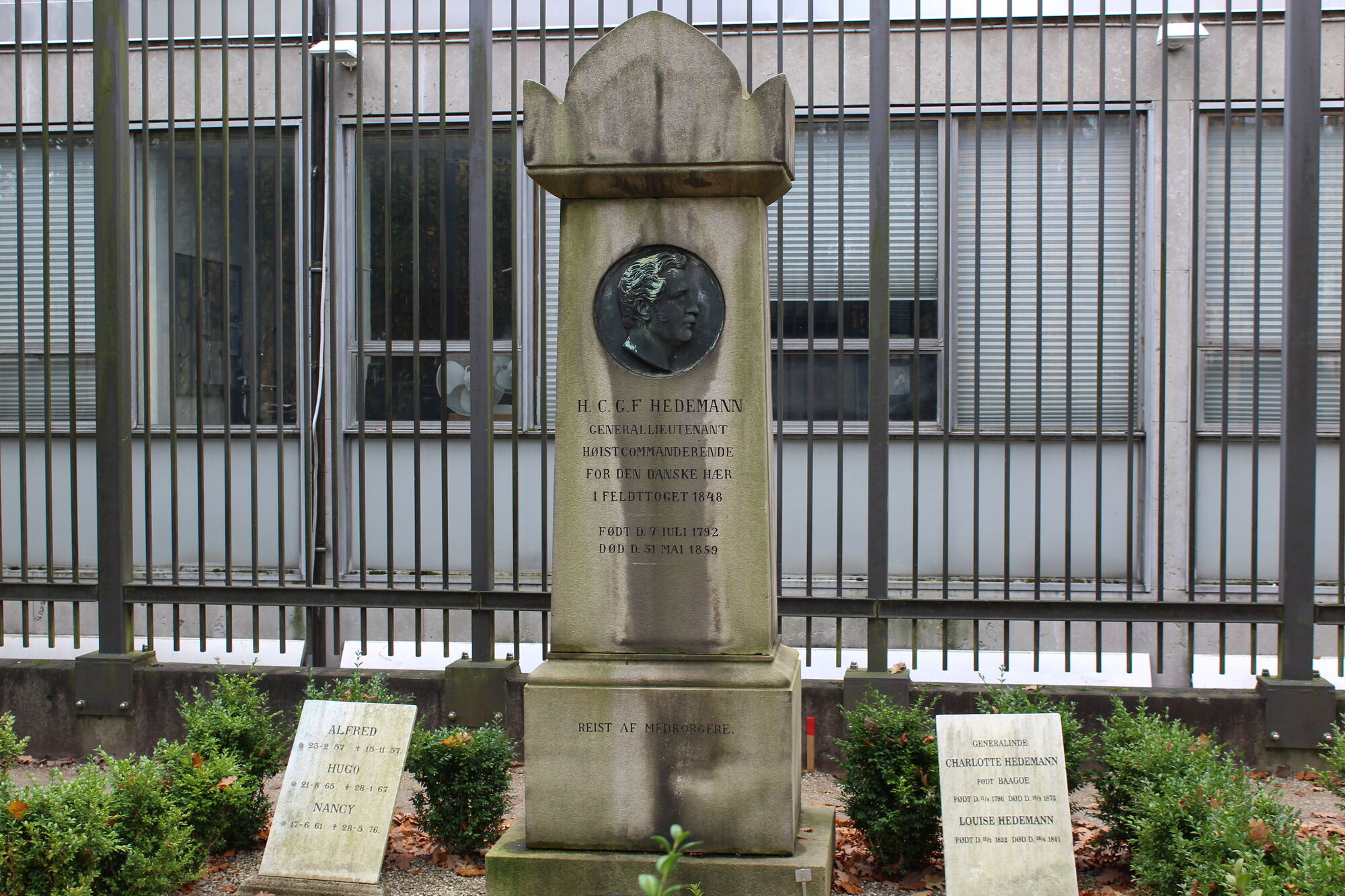
Hedemann's tombstone at Copenhagen's Garrison Cemetery.

Hedemann was finally removed from the Army High Command on 16 July. It is not known whether this was due to an intervention by Harbou or to the beginning of the ceasefire. As a result, Hedemann went to Copenhagen to take over the chairmanship of an advisory committee under the War Ministry. At the same time he was again commander of the citadel. Hedemann did not overcome this degradation, although the king also appointed him Chamberlain and in 1853 Knight of the Order of the Dannebrog.

Increasing weakness of the eyes caused Hedemann in 1854 to request his resignation. Hedemann died in Copenhagen in 1859, he was buried in the garrison cemetery, where his grave with his portrait medallion has been preserved.

== Family ==
Hedemann was the father of the future Danish general Johan Hedemann (1825–1901), who had already served under his father in the battles in Nybøl and Dybbøl, and of the later general and politician Marius Hedemann (1836–1903).

== Bibliography ==
- S. A. Sørensen: Hedemann, Hans Christopher Georg Frederik. In: Carl Frederik Bricka (Hrsg.): Dansk biografisk Lexikon. Tillige omfattende Norge for Tidsrummet 1537–1814
