= Friderich Adolph Schleppegrell =

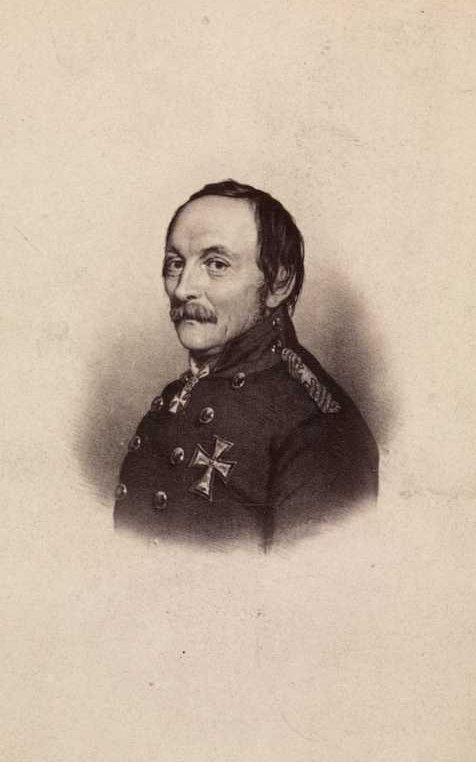
- Generalmajor Frederik Adolph Schleppegrell
- Born: 28 June 1792; Brunlanes, Denmark-Norway
- Died: 26 July 1850 (aged 58); Isted, Denmark
- Burial place: Flensburg
- Military career
- Allegiance: Denmark
- Branch: Royal Danish Army
- Rank: Major General
- Conflicts: First War of Schleswig; Battle of Isted †

Friderich Adolph von Schleppegrell (28 June 1792 – 26 July 1850) was a Dano-Norwegian military officer.

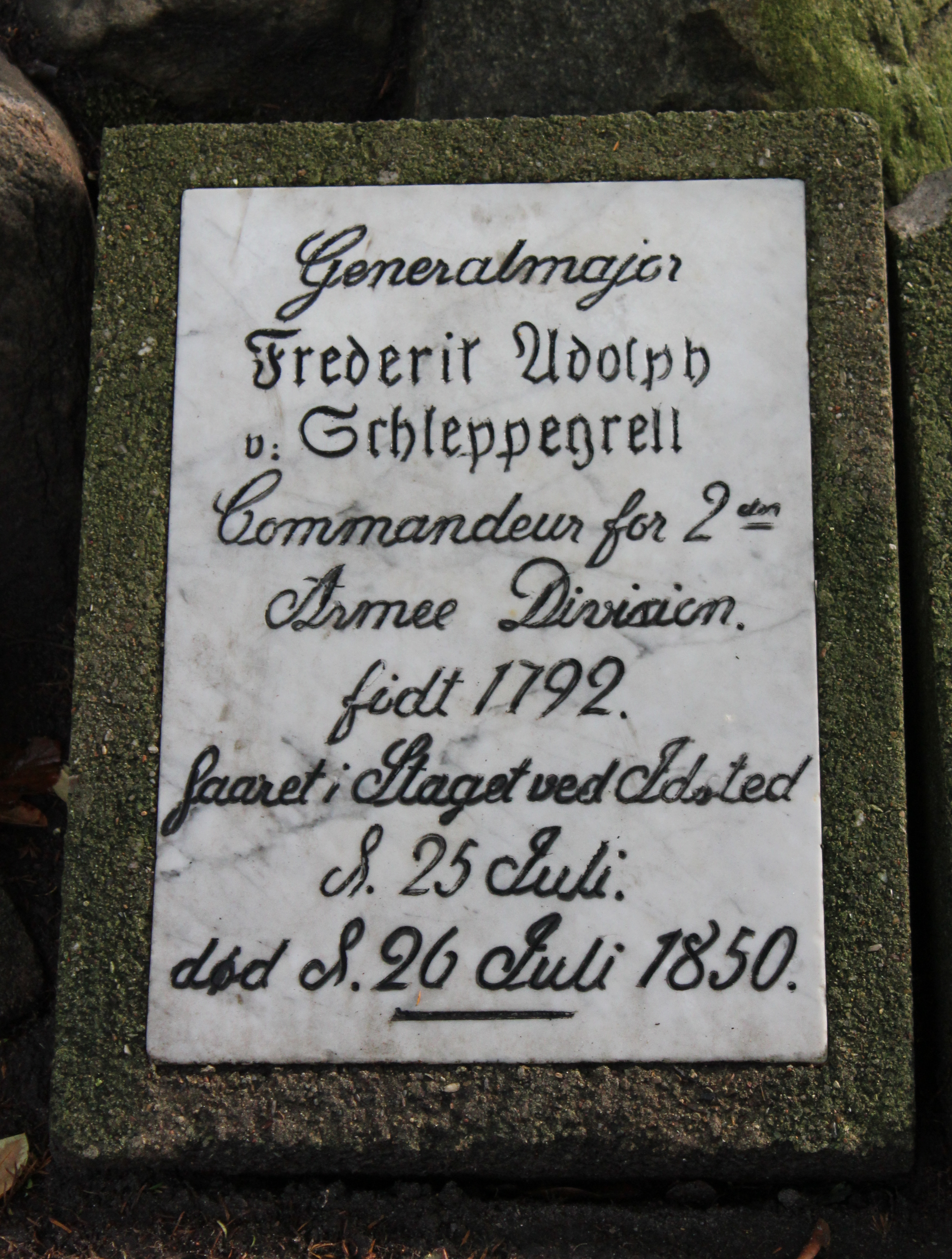
Gravestone

Son of Lieutenant-Colonel Otto Heinrich von Schleppegrell (1729-1808) and Cathrine Abigael Zimmer (1750-1836), he was born in Brunlanes. He became a military officer in 1807, and took part in the Gunboat War for Denmark-Norway. When Norway became independent of Denmark, only to enter a personal union with Sweden in November 1814, Schleppegrell changed his allegiance to Denmark.

By 1848 he had been promoted to Major General. The same year, the First Schleswig War broke out. Schleppegrell excelled in the battles of Nybøl, Dybbøl and Fredericia, but fell on 25 July 1850 at the battle of Isted, dying the following day from a bullet wound to the head. He was buried in Flensborg. The memorial Isted Lion is partly dedicated to Schleppegrell.
