= Friedrich Graf von Wrangel =

Prussian Army general (1784–1877)

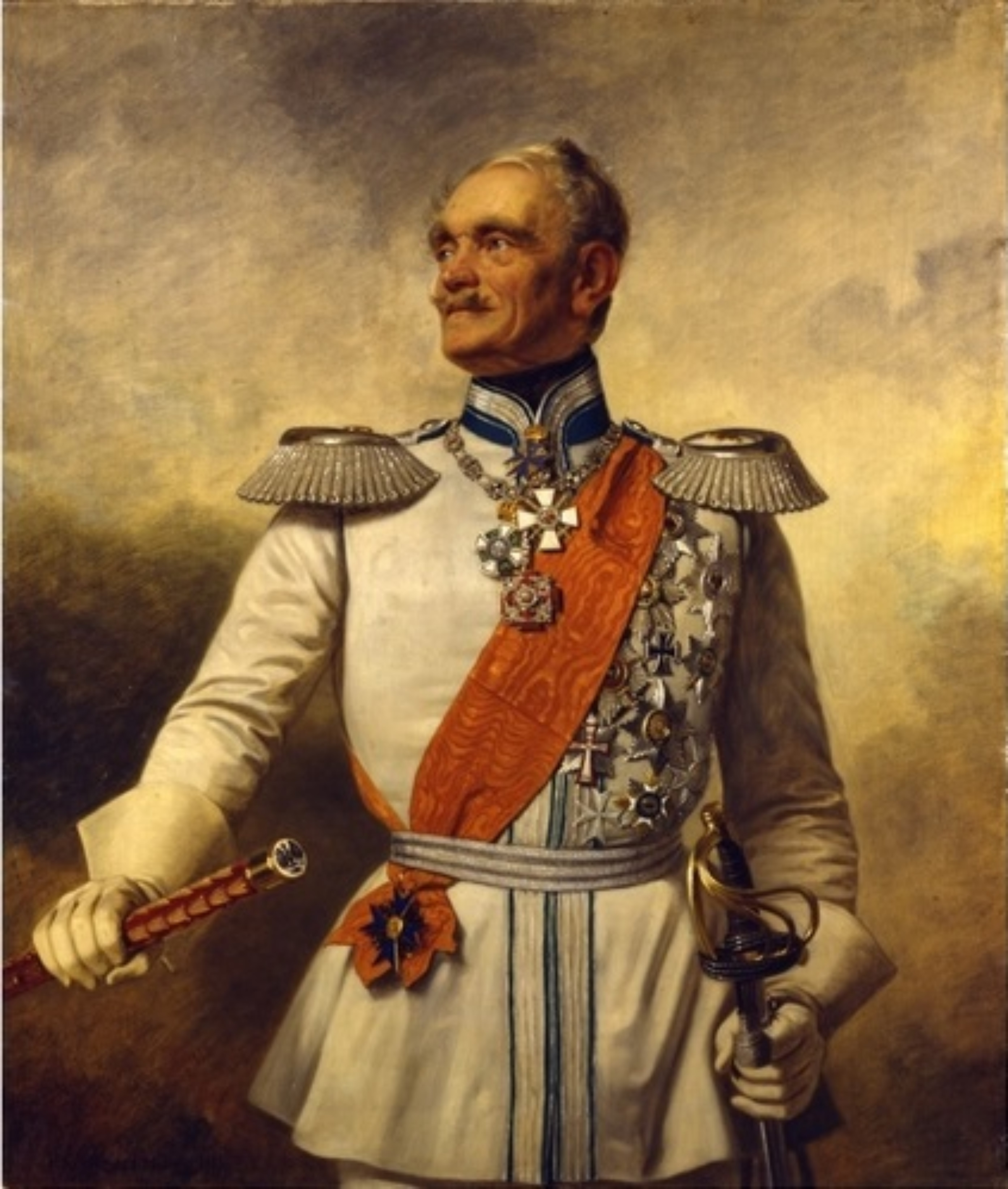
- Portrait by Franz Krüger, before 1857
- Born: 13 April 1784; Stettin, Kingdom of Prussia (now Szczecin, Poland)
- Died: 2 November 1877 (aged 93); Berlin, German Empire
- Military career
- Allegiance: Kingdom of Prussia; North German Confederation
- Branch: Prussian Army
- Service years: 1796–1864
- Rank: Generalfeldmarschall
- Nickname: Papa Wrangel
- Conflicts: See battles: Napoleonic Wars; Battle of Heilsberg; Battle of Leipzig; First Schleswig War; Battle of Schleswig; Battle of Dybbøl; Second Schleswig War; Evacuation of Fredericia; Battle of Dybbøl; Austro-Prussian War; Franco-Prussian War
- Awards: Pour le Mérite; Iron Cross

Friedrich Heinrich Ernst Graf von Wrangel (13 April 1784 – 2 November 1877) was a Generalfeldmarschall of the Prussian Army.

A Baltic German, he was nicknamed "Papa Wrangel" and was a member of the Baltic noble family of Wrangel.

== Early life and career ==
Wrangel was born in Stettin (now Szczecin, Poland) in Pomerania into the Wrangel family. He was actually a relative uncle to the world-famous explorer Ferdinand von Wrangel. He entered a dragoon regiment in 1796 and became second lieutenant in 1798. He fought as a subaltern during the Napoleonic Wars, distinguishing himself especially at Heilsberg in 1807 and receiving the order Pour le Mérite. In the reorganization of the army, Wrangel became first lieutenant and then captain; won distinction and promotion to lieutenant-colonel in the War of Liberation in 1813; won the Iron Cross at Wachau, near Leipzig; and became colonel in 1815.

Wrangel commanded a cavalry brigade in 1821, and two years later, he was promoted to major-general. He commanded the 13th Division, with headquarters at Münster, in Westphalia, in 1834 during riots caused by differences between the Archbishop of Cologne and the Crown, and the determination and the resolution with which he treated the clerical party prevented serious trouble. He was promoted to lieutenant-general, received many honours from the court, enjoyed the confidence of the Junkers and commanded at Königsberg and then Stettin.

== First Schleswig War ==
In 1848, Wrangel commanded the II Corps of the army of the German Confederation during the First Schleswig War, was promoted to General of Cavalry and won several battles. However, the other European powers pressured Prussia to withdraw its forces, and King Frederick William IV accordingly ordered Wrangel to withdraw his troops from the duchies. Wrangel refused by asserting that he was under the command of not the king of Prussia but the regent of Germany. He proposed that at the very least, any treaty concluded should be presented for ratification to the Frankfurt Parliament, which was dominated by the liberals, which gave Liberals the rather mistaken idea that Wrangel was on their side. However, the Danes rejected that proposal, and negotiations were broken off, and after painful hesitation, Prussia signed a convention at Malmö that yielded to practically all of the Danish demands on 26 August 1848.

== German Revolutions ==
Wrangel's insubordination was not counted against him when, in the autumn, he was summoned to Berlin to suppress its riots during the German revolutions of 1848–49. As governor of Berlin and commander-in-chief of Brandenburg (appointments that he held until his death), he proclaimed a state of siege and ejected the Liberal president and the members of the Chamber. Thus, on two occasions in the troubled history of Prussia's revival, Wrangel's uncompromising sternness achieved its object without bloodshed.

== Second Schleswig War ==
From then on, Wrangel was most prominent in connection with the revival of the Prussian cavalry from the neglect and inefficiency into which it had fallen during the years of peace and poverty since 1815. In 1856, after 60 years of service, he was made a field marshal. At the age of 80, he commanded the Austro-Prussian army in the Second Schleswig War with Denmark in 1864. Wrangel was too old for active work and often issued vague or impracticable orders; he had always desired the young "Red Prince", Prince Frederick Charles of Prussia, to have the command. However, the prestige of Wrangel's name and the leadership of Frederick Charles, Helmuth von Moltke the Elder, Eduard Vogel von Falckenstein and Ludwig von Gablenz made the campaign an overwhelming success.

== Later life ==
After the Battle of Dybbøl, Wrangel resigned his command, was created a Graf (count), and received other honours. In 1866, "Papa" Wrangel assisted in the Austro-Prussian War but without a command on account of his great age. He took a keen interest in the second reorganisation of the cavalry army in 1866 to 1870, and in the Franco-Prussian War in 1870 to 1871. He died in Berlin in 1877.

== Legacy ==
On the 70th anniversary of his joining the army, Wrangel's regiment, the 3rd Cuirassiers, was given the title Graf Wrangel. A noteworthy Commander of this regiment was the Swedish Count Gilbert Hamilton who led the regiment during World War I.

== Honours ==
He received the following orders and decorations:

- Prussia:
  - Pour le Mérite, 18 July 1807; with Oak Leaves, 13 September 1848; with Crown, 13 January 1857
  - Iron Cross (1813), 1st Class, 8 December 1813
  - Knight of the Red Eagle, 1st Class with Oak Leaves in Diamonds, 1846; with Swords, 1848; Grand Cross, 13 April 1865
  - Knight of the Black Eagle, with Collar, 18 October 1849; Chancellor, 1859; in Diamonds, 1861
  - Grand Commander's Cross of the Royal House Order of Hohenzollern, 1851; with Star, 17 March 1863; with Swords, 1864; in Diamonds, 1871
  - Captain of the Johanniter Order, 1854
  - Knight of the Royal Crown Order, 1st Class with Swords, Oak Leaves and Enamel Band of the Red Eagle, 15 August 1866
  - Military Service Award, 1st Class
- Ascanian duchies: Grand Cross of the Order of Albert the Bear, 31 January 1855; with Swords, 5 December 1864
- Austria:
  - Grand Cross of the Imperial Order of Leopold, 1851
  - Grand Cross of the Royal Hungarian Order of St. Stephen, 1852
  - Commander of the Military Order of Maria Theresa, 1864
- Baden: Grand Cross of the Military Karl-Friedrich Merit Order, 1850
- Bavaria: Grand Cross of Merit of the Bavarian Crown, 1853
- Belgium: Grand Cordon of the Order of Leopold, 10 May 1853
- Brunswick: Grand Cross of the Order of Henry the Lion
- Denmark: Grand Cross of the Dannebrog, 6 November 1843
- (Saxe-Coburg and Gotha) (Duchy of Saxe-Altenburg) (Saxe-Meiningen) Ernestine duchies: Grand Cross of the Saxe-Ernestine House Order, 1853
- Hanover: Grand Cross of the Royal Guelphic Order, 1843
- Mecklenburg:
  - Grand Cross of the Wendish Crown, with Crown in Diamonds
  - Military Merit Cross, 1st Class (Schwerin)
- Oldenburg: Grand Cross of the Order of Duke Peter Friedrich Ludwig, with Golden Crown, 30 September 1848
- Parma: Grand Cross of St. Louis for Civil Merit, 1850
- Russia:
  - Knight of St. Vladimir, 4th Class with Swords, 25 October 1808
  - Knight of St. Andrew, 30 September 1856; in Diamonds, 12 January 1860
- Sweden-Norway: Knight of the Seraphim, 11 August 1859
