= Idstedt =

Idstedt Isted
- Municipality
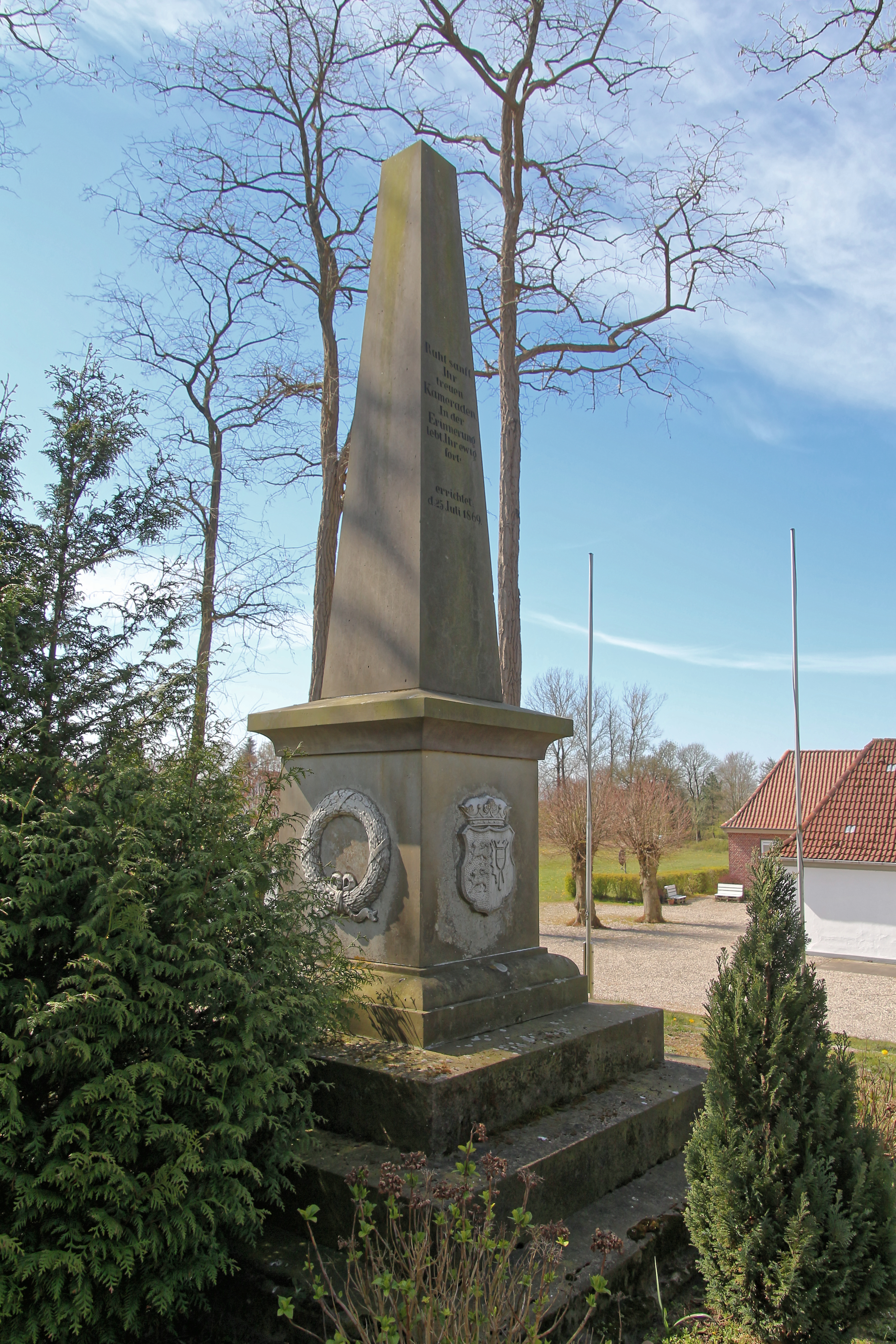
- Memorial to the Battle of Isted in Istedt

- Coat of arms

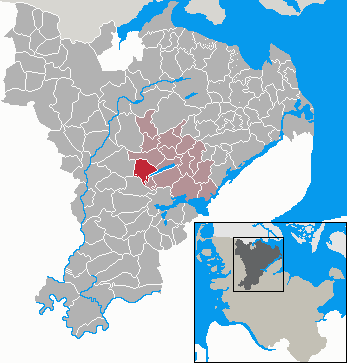
- Location of Idstedt; Isted within Schleswig-Flensburg district
- Interactive map of Idstedt; Isted
- Location within Germany Location within Schleswig-Holstein
- Coordinates: 54°34′50″N 9°30′30″E
- Country: Germany
- State: Schleswig-Holstein
- District: Schleswig-Flensburg
- Municipal assoc.: Südangeln

Government
  - Mayor: Edgar Petersen

Area
  - Total: 13.35 km^{2} (5.15 sq mi)
- Elevation: 26 m (85 ft)

Population (2025-12-31)
  - Total: 887
  - Density: 66.4/km^{2} (172/sq mi)
- Time zone: UTC+01:00 (CET)
  - Summer (DST): UTC+02:00 (CEST)
- Postal codes: 24879
- Dialling codes: 04625
- Vehicle registration: SL
- Website: www.amt- suedangeln.de

Idstedt (Danish: Isted) is a village in Schleswig-Flensburg district in Schleswig-Holstein, Germany. It is c. 10 km. NNW of the city of Schleswig and east of the Bundesautobahn 7.

On 24–25 July 1850, the Battle of Isted ended the First War of Schleswig.
