= Thorald Læssøe =

Danish artist (1816–1878)

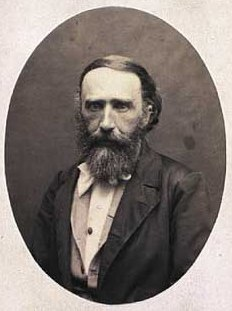
- Born: 25 June 1816; Frederikshavn, Denmark
- Died: 25 March 1878 (aged 61); Copenhagen, Denmark
- Education: Royal Danish Academy of Fine Arts
- Spouse: Emy Francisca Erhardine Tidonia (m. 1857; died 1863)
- Children: 2
- Relatives: Frederik Læssøe (brother)

Thorald Læssøe (25 June 1816 – 25 March 1878) was a Danish landscape painter active during the Danish Golden Age. Several of his paintings are owned by the National Gallery of Denmark.

== Biography ==
Læssøe was born in 1816 in Frederikshavn to Niels Frederik Læssøe, a customs inspector, and his second wife, Margrethe Juliane Signe Læssøe (née Abrahamson). Læssøe was the brother of Army officer Frederik Læssøe, numismatist Ludvig Læssøe, and priest Kristian Frederik Læssøe. As a teenager, he decided to become an artist after initially planning to study civil service.

Although he was primarily self-taught, Læssøe had periodically attended the Royal Danish Academy of Fine Arts from 1834 to 1839, where he was a student of Christian Holm and briefly Christen Købke. He spent the following decades residing in various cities across Europe, such as Basel, Prague, and Rome.

Læssøe belonged to the circle of Lorenz Frølich, Jens Adolf Jerichau, J.T. Lundbye, and P. C. Skovgaard but did not reach the same degree of their popularity.

In 1857, Læssøe married Emy Francisca Erhardine Tidonia. After she died in 1863, he lived in Rome for a second time with his two children from 1866 to 1868. Læssøe died in 1878 in Copenhagen, aged 61.

== Selected works ==
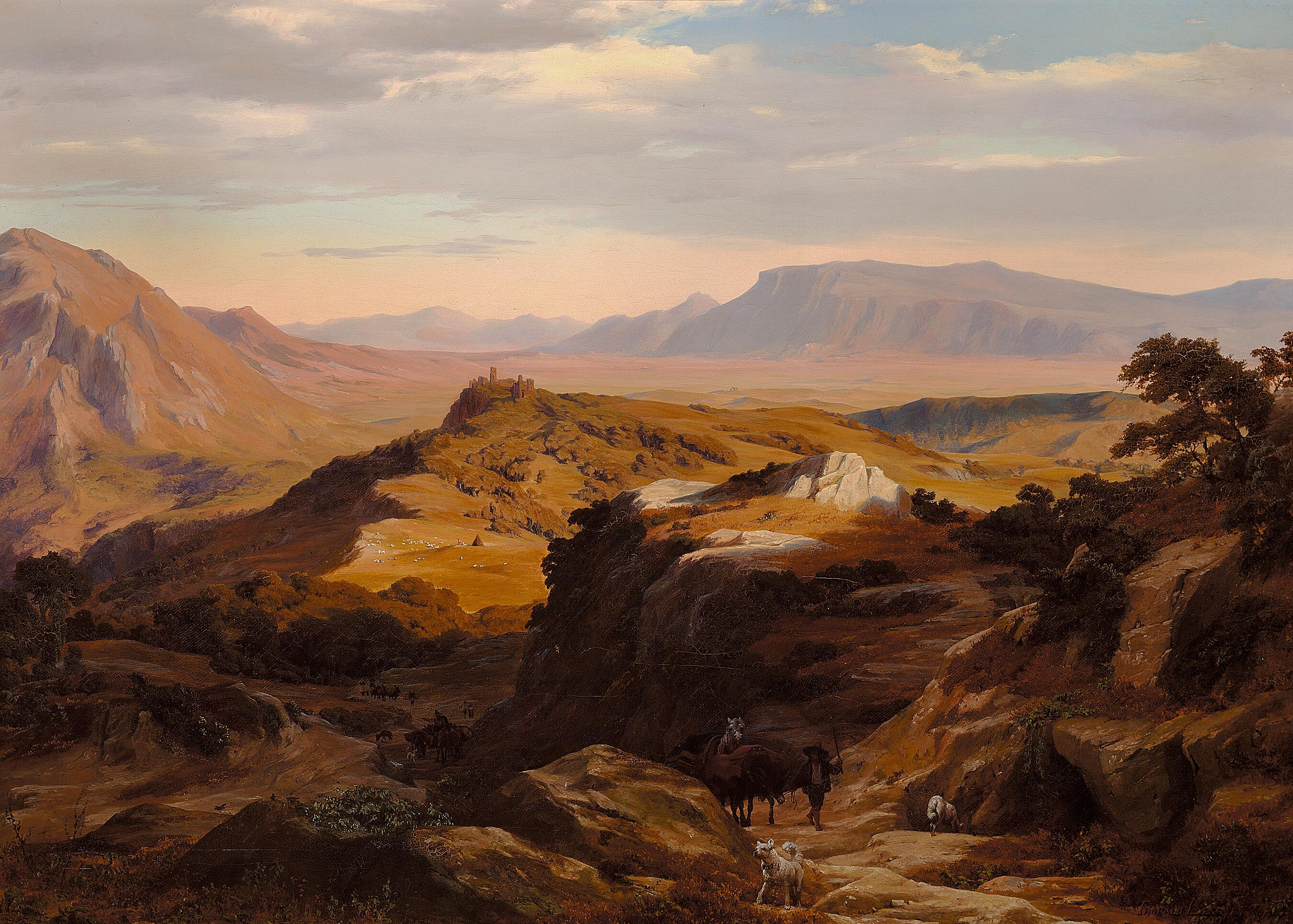
Landscape near Rome with the Alban Hills in the distance, 1847

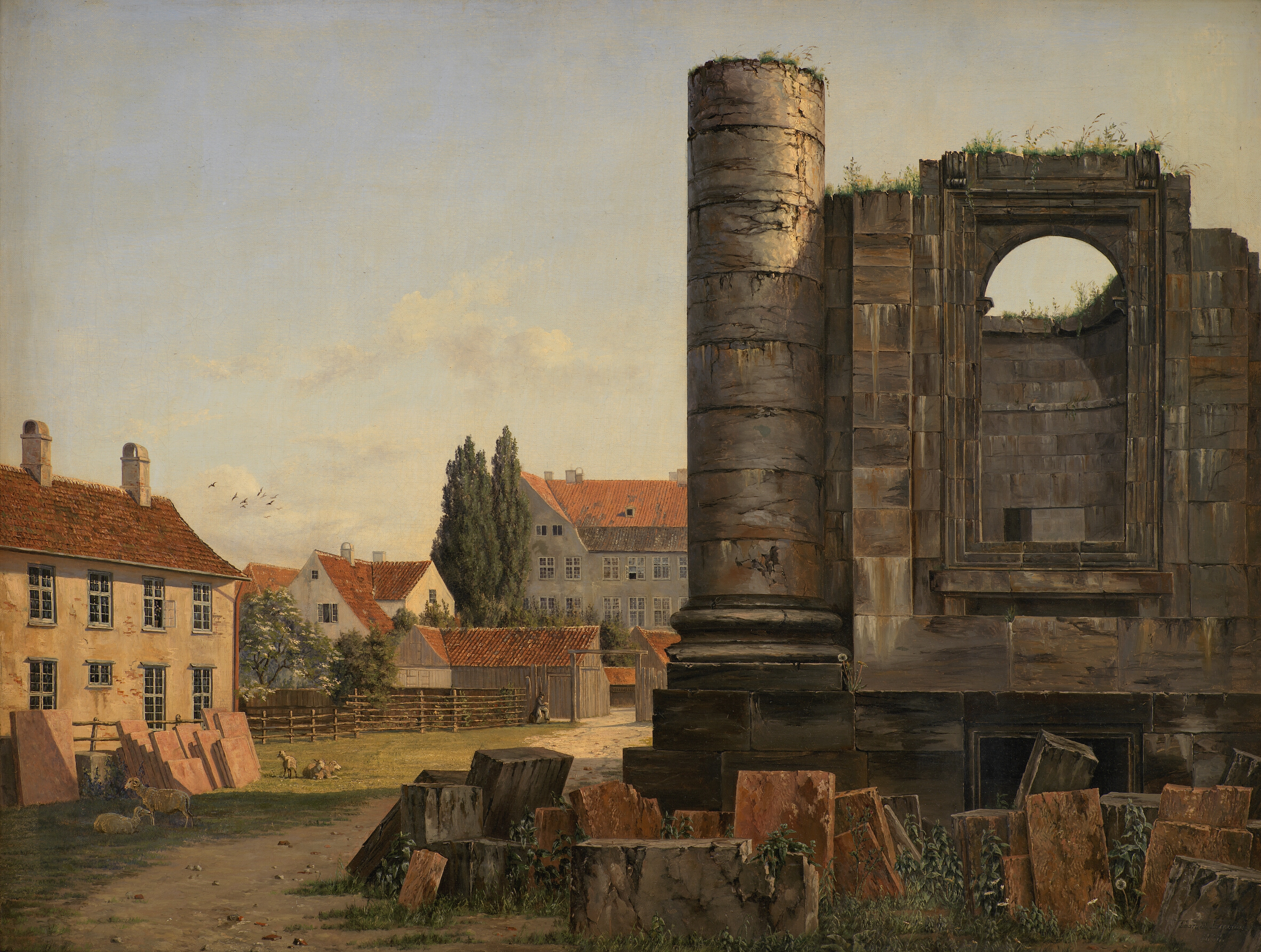
Part of Marble Square with the ruins of the unfinished Frederik's Church, 1838

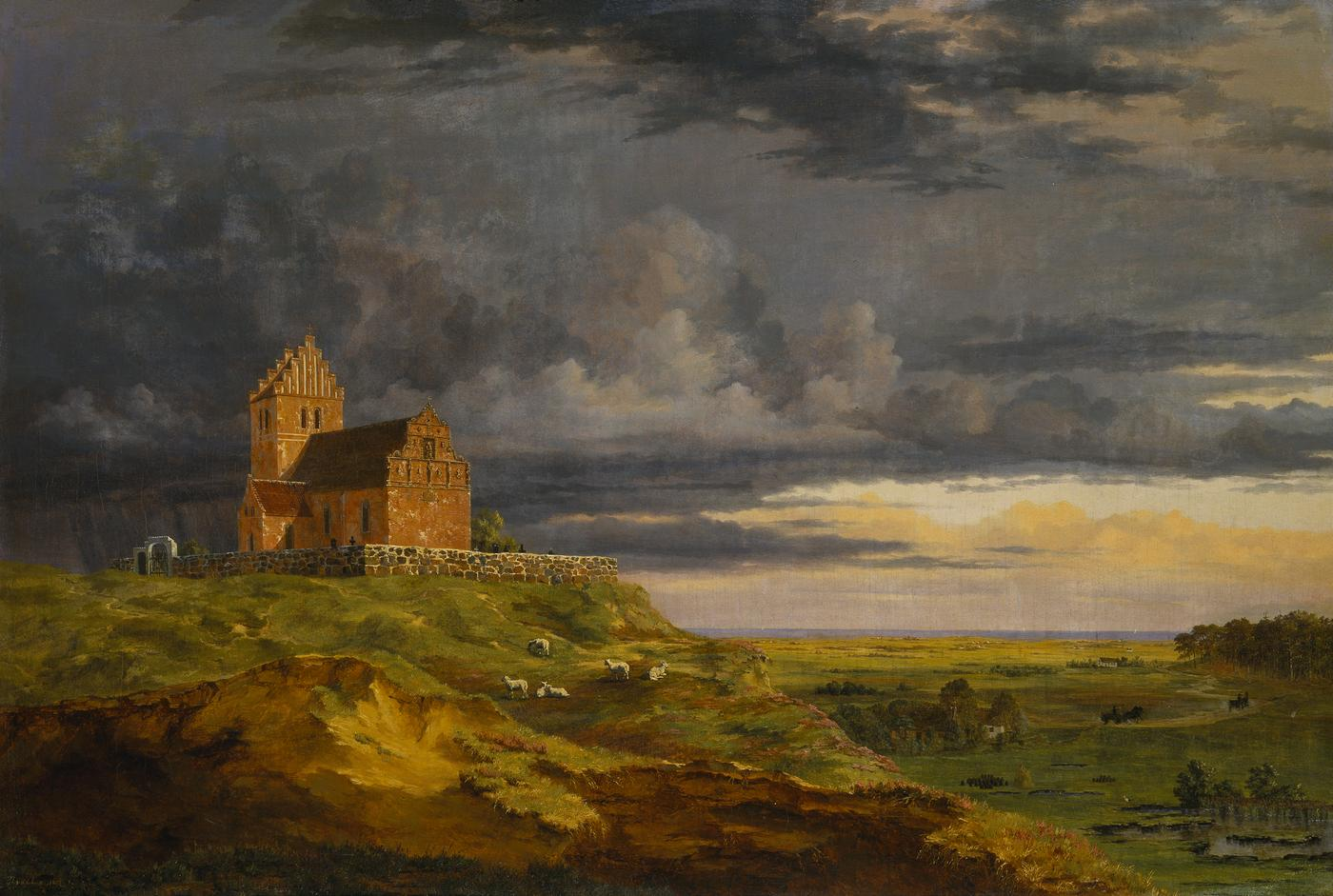
Valløby Church on Zealand, 1839

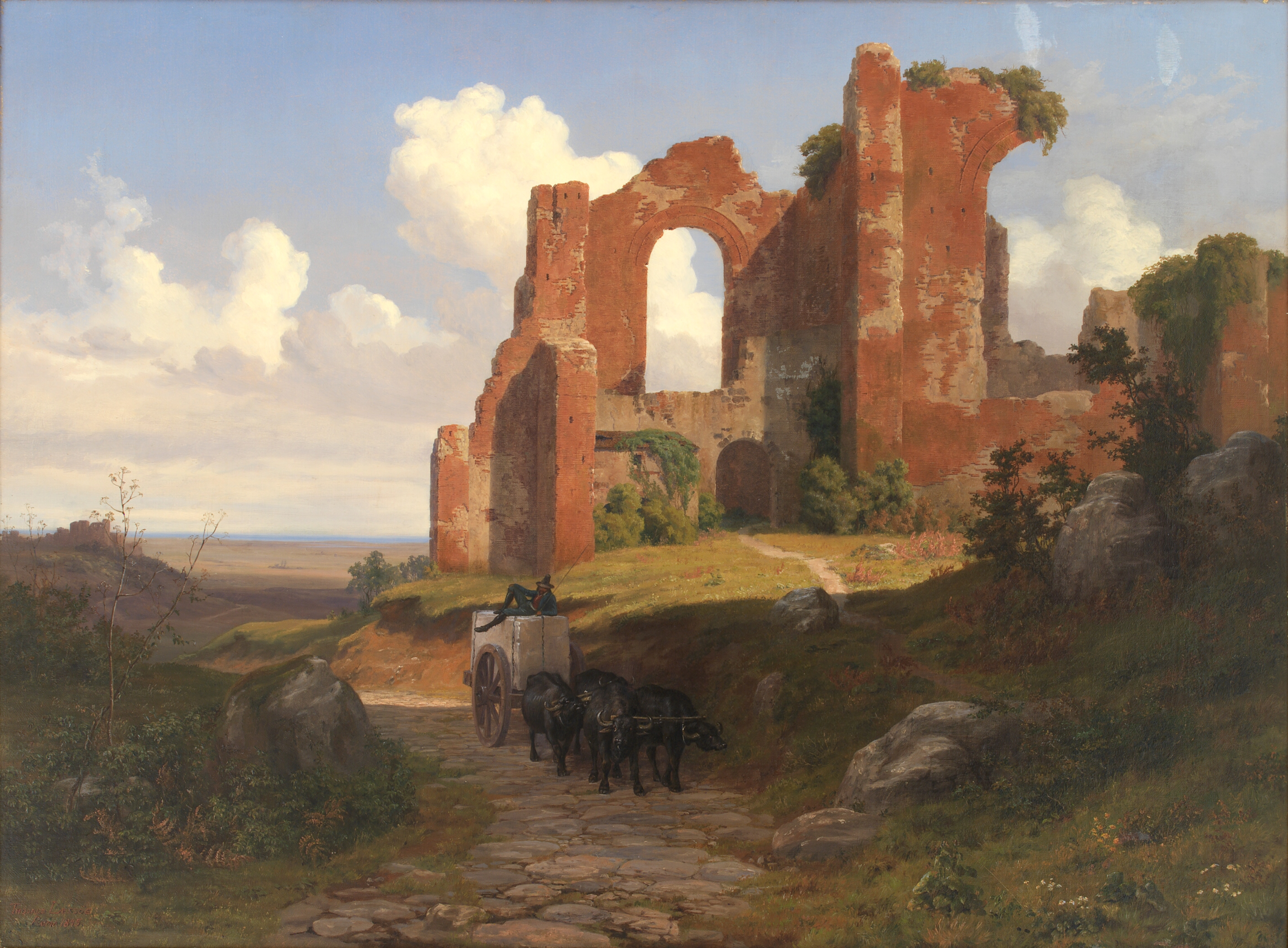
View of the Terme di Caracalla in Rome, 1845

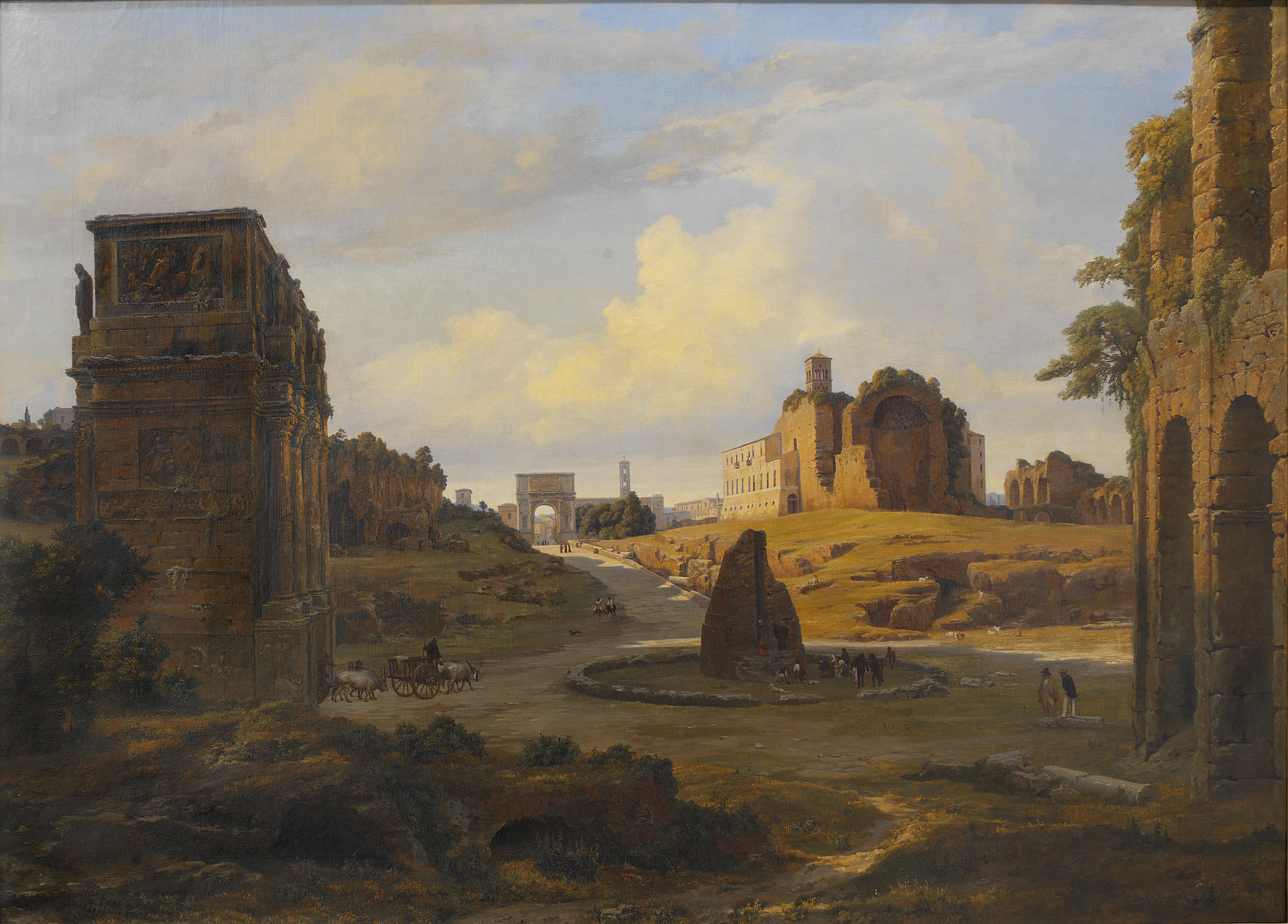
View towards the Roman Forum from the Colosseum, 1848
