= Battle of Schleswig =

1848 battle of the First Schleswig War

- Part of the First Schleswig War
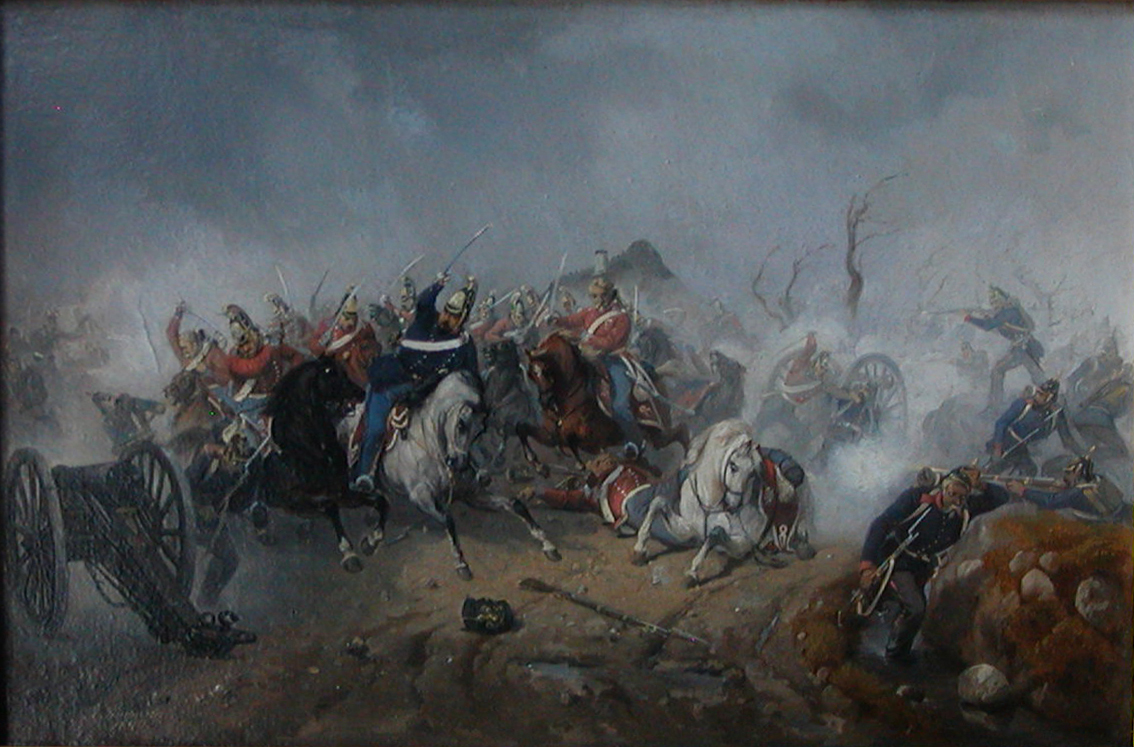
- Captain Würtzen's dragoons recapture two Danish guns. Painting by Niels Simonsen.
Date	23 April 1848
Location	Schleswig, Busdorf
Result	Prussian victory

Belligerents
Denmark	Prussia; Duchy of Schleswig

Commanders and leaders
(Denmark) Frederik Læssøe	(Kingdom of Prussia) Friedrich von Wrangel

Strength
18,000	12,000–18,000

Casualties and losses
170 killed 463 wounded 258 captured	41 killed 366 wounded 54 captured

The Battle of Schleswig occurred near the Danevirke on Easter morning, 23 April 1848 as the second battle of the First Schleswig War of 1848–1850.

Prussia had just entered the war and had sent almost 12,000 troops to Schleswig-Holstein on command of the German Confederation. Counting reserves, General Wrangel commanded in total more than 18,000 men – almost three times the size of the Danish forces. The German Reich troops did not participate in the battle, but their presence forced the Danes to fight defensively against the Prussians.

On a cold and wet spring morning the Prussians attacked, but were held back by Colonel Frederik Læssøe who admirably defended himself, and losses were limited. There was still a horrific number of casualties.

The battle led to an acute bout of discouragement in Denmark – a sharp reversal from the optimism of the March entry of Denmark into war. The army withdrew to Funen leaving Jutland open to Wrangel's troops.

The battle inspired writer Carl Ploug to write a song about the battle, "Paaskeklokken kimed mildt..." (full text)
