= Armistice of Malmö =

1848 armistice between Denmark and Prussia during the First Schleswig War

The Treaty of Malmö was an armistice concluded between Denmark and Prussia on 26 August 1848 during the First Schleswig War. The agreement temporarily settled the conflict over the duchies of Schleswig and Holstein, establishing a seven-month truce.

== History ==
Schleswig and Holstein (along with Lauenburg) were duchies under the Danish crown, with the Danish king serving as duke. In March 1848, a revolutionary, German-oriented provisional government was formed in Kiel, Holstein, claiming authority over both duchies. The German Confederation and later the revolutionary German Empire supported the Kiel government militarily, with forces largely provided by Prussia.

The conflict over the duchies had become one of the most charged nationalist issues of the 1848 revolutions, symbolising the struggle between Danish and German claims to sovereignty. When Prussia, under pressure from Great Britain and Russia, agreed to a ceasefire in Malmö, it was widely seen in Germany as a betrayal of the national cause. The Frankfurt Parliament, which had declared Schleswig-Holstein "a question of honour for the German nation" reluctantly accepted the treaty, sparking outrage among nationalists and leading to the September riots in Frankfurt.

Denmark denounced the armistice on 22 February 1849, beginning the second phase of the war between Denmark and a German army under the Prussian general Moritz Karl Ernst von Prittwitz. The conflict ended in the summer of 1850 with a new peace agreement, which largely restored the pre-war situation.

== Sources ==
- Dowe, Dieter (2001). Europe in 1848: Revolution and Reform. Berghahn Books. ISBN 978-1-57181-164-6.
