= Battle of Bov =

1848 First Schleswig War battle

- Part of the First Schleswig War
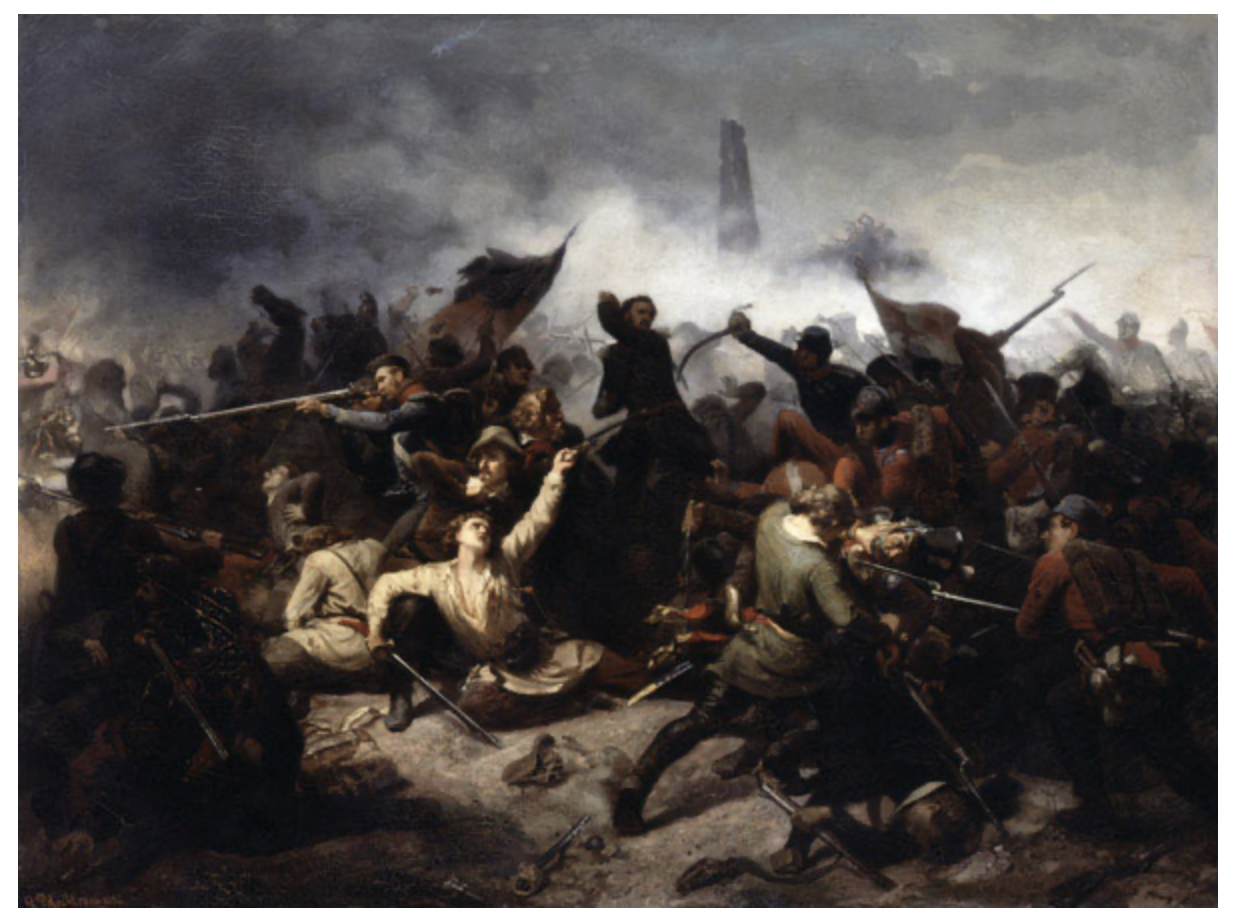
- Battle of Bov by Georg Bleibtreu
Date	9 April 1848
Location	Near Flensborg, Schleswig
Result	Danish victory

Belligerents
Duchy of Schleswig	Denmark

Commanders and leaders
Prince of Noer; Alfred von Krohn	(Denmark) Hans Hedemann

Strength
7,000 Freikorps	15,000 soldiers

Casualties and losses
1,096 killed, wounded or captured	103 killed or wounded

The Battle of Bov (German: Schlacht von Bau, Danish: Slaget ved Bov) was a battle between troops fighting for Schleswig-Holstein, and those for Denmark, which happened on 9 April 1848 near the town of Flensborg in Denmark, during the First Schleswig War. The Danes won the engagement. It was the first battle of the First Schleswig War.

== Background ==
In 1848, the First Schleswig War began. Schleswig-Holstein was trying to separate from Denmark, and Denmark considered it a part of the country. The Kingdom of Prussia, the Austrian Empire and the German Confederation, (Note: Although the Austrian Empire and the Kingdom of Prussia were members of the German Confederation, they supported Schleswig-Holstein independent of the Confederation during the First Schleswig War.) sent troops to support Schleswig-Holstein in its attempt to secede from Denmark, and become a part of the German Confederation. Wishing to defeat Denmark before the German, Austrian, and Prussian troops arrived, 7,000 Schleswig-Holsteinian soldiers under General Alfred von Krohn occupied Flensborg on March 31, 1848.

== Prelude ==
Danish troops landed on the Holdnaes peninsula east of Flensborg and, worried that he would be surrounded, General Krohn asked for permission to withdraw his soldiers from the settlement. His request was approved, and he planned to fall back during April 9. Danish commanders had decided their attack would start before Krohn withdrew. They decided that the left flank of the Danish army would launch a diversionary attack, whilst the right wing and cavalry would encircle the enemy. Their attack would be supported by a naval squadron in Flensborg Fjord. The Schleswig-Holsteinians were arranged according to the plan that they were going to withdraw, and were not prepared to put up a coordinated resistance.

== Battle ==
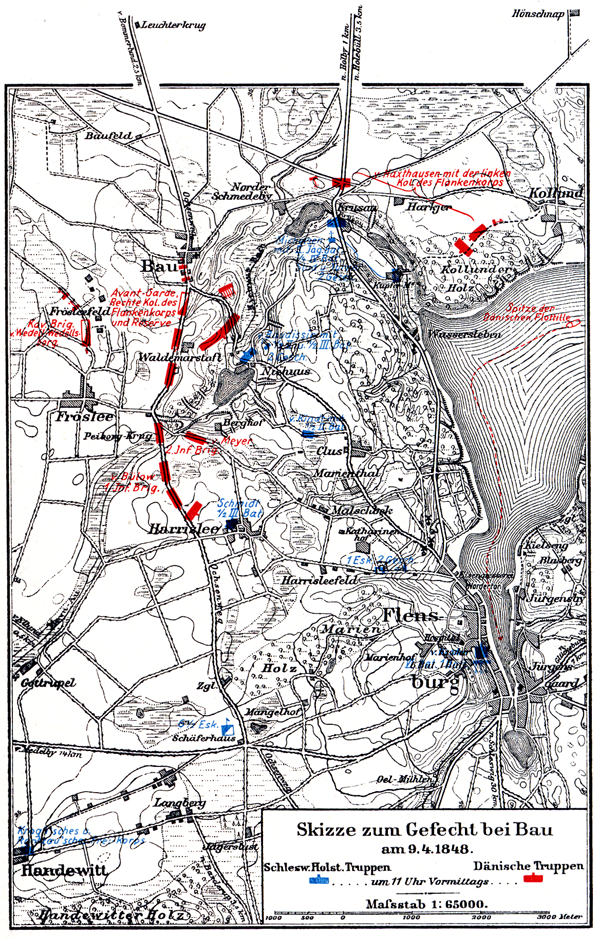
Map of the battle

On the morning of April 9, the Danish forces advanced. The avant-garde under von Magius with the 3rd Hunter Corps and the 12th Battalion, supported by four guns, attacked from the northeast the Schleswig-Holsteinian main position at Bov. From the east, the 1st Hunter Corps and a couple of companies of the 5th and 9th Battalions carried out an attack on the Schleswig-Holsteinian position in the forest around Kobbermøllen. It was defended by a hunting corps and the Kiel students under the command of Major Michelsen.

Bov eventually fell to the Danish avant-garde, and the Schleswig-Holsteinians withdrew, first to Nyhus and then to Harrislev, where they had barricaded the entrances to the town and arranged the houses for defense. Around 12 p.m, the 1st and 11th Battalions attacked from the north and west and the 2nd Battalion from the south, while two guns supported the attack. The Schleswig-Holsteinians were forced back to Flensburg, where they occupied a new position in the woods north of the town, in some brickworks and houses on the northern outskirts. After repeated attacks by the 2nd Battalion, the Schleswig-Holsteinians were forced to surrender or flee south. While this was going on, Major Michelsen's forces were still standing at Kobbermøllen, not knowing that their main force had to withdraw from Bov. Around 12 p.m he was finally informed that Nyhus had been abandoned, and his strength was thus in danger of being cut off. He ordered a retreat, but his position was shelled by Danish warships from Flensburg Fjord, and he was mortally wounded.

Some of the Schleswig-Holsteinians took a position on Møllebakkerne north of the town, while others managed to reach back to the outskirts of Flensburg. Here they managed to repel some attacks by the 2nd Battalion. Only when the Danish 4th Battalion came from the west, they were forced out. Shortly afterwards, the Schleswig-Holsteinian forces on Møllebakkerne also surrendered. Michelsen himself fell badly wounded in Danish captivity and died shortly after. Fortunately for the Schleswig-Holsteinians, the Danish commander-in-chief Hedemann could not prevent their withdrawal. Still, the Danish victory was secured. Around 14:30 p.m the fighting was over, and the Schleswig-Holsteinians fled south.

== Aftermath ==
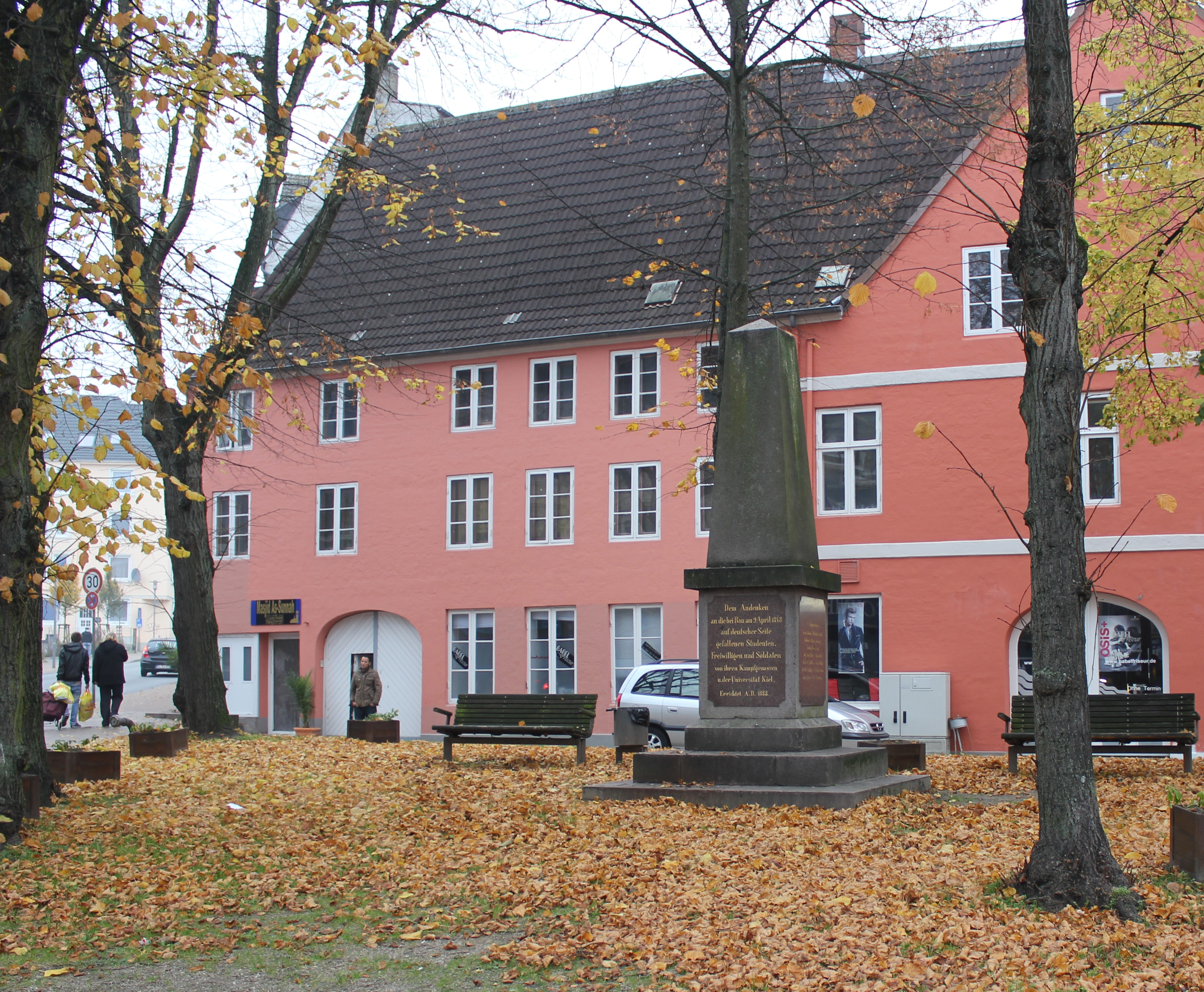
Memorial Site in Flensburg

The Danish army followed and took up a position at the Danevirke. Hedemann's planned encirclement of Krohn's army succeeded only in part, so that the Schleswig-Holsteinian main force could escape back to Rendsburg; its losses were 16% of its total strength; the Danish losses were 0.8%. The victory at Bov was greeted with cheers in Denmark and gave rise to great optimism regarding the Danish chances of victory in the impending war.
