= Battle of Dybbøl (1848) =

Battle of the First Schleswig War

- Part of First Schleswig War
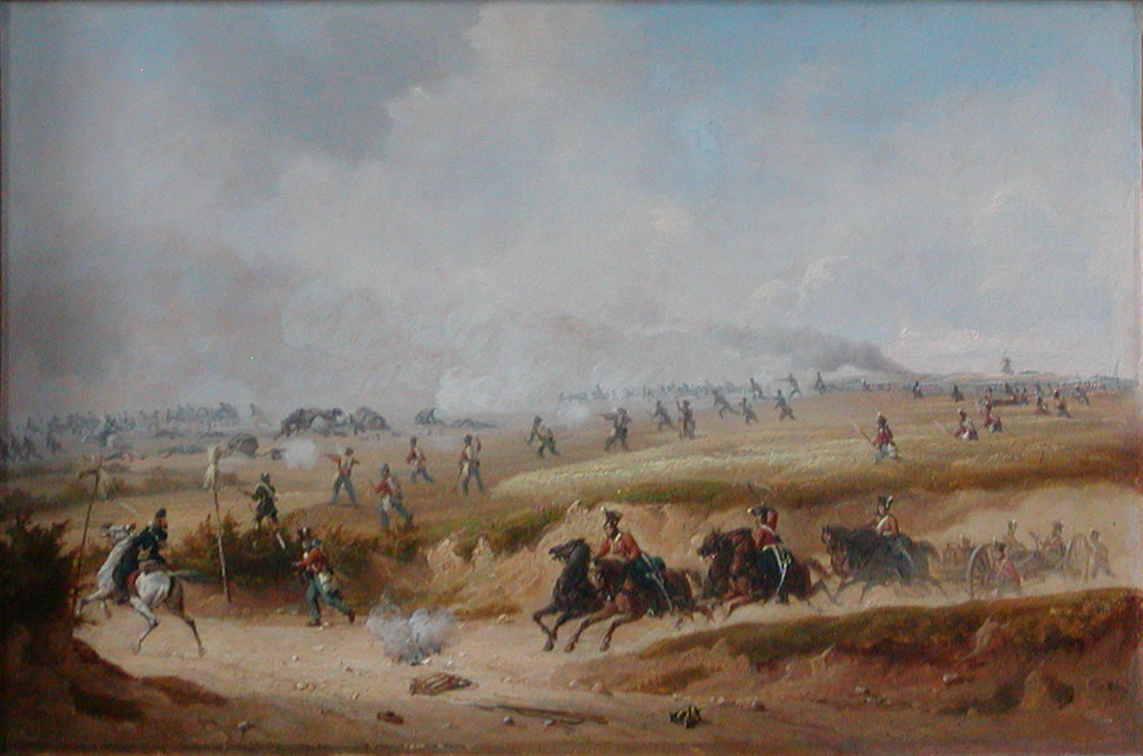
- Battle of Dybbøl 5 june, 1848 by Niels Simonsen
Date	5 June 1848
Location	Dybbøl, near Sønderborg, Southern Jutland, Denmark
Result	Danish victory

Belligerents
Prussia	Denmark

Commanders and leaders
(Kingdom of Prussia) Friedrich von Wrangel (Kingdom of Prussia) Eduard von Bonin (Kingdom of Hanover) Hugh Halkett	(Denmark) Hans Hedemann (Denmark) Friderich Adolph Schleppegrell

Strength
20,000; 11,500 reserves	14,000

Casualties and losses
337 killed & wounded	230 killed & wounded

The First Battle of Dybbøl was the first of three battles of the First War of Schleswig to be fought at the town of Dybbøl between the Danish army and forces of Prussia and the other German states.

== Background ==
To remove the threat to his right flank after the battle at Nybøl, General Wrangel decided to try a new attack on the Danish forces at Sundeved. Three German brigades (with a total of 11,500 men) were gathered at the village of Kvaers and prepared for an immediate departure. The Danes scaffolding stretched from Nybøl, the south of Korsmose mill and Snokebaek to Alssundet in the north. The lines of defense were kept by the Danish flank division and parts of the 4th Brigade while the 3rd Division was kept in reserve at Dybbøl. The rest of the Danish army were ordered to hold onto Als.

== Battle ==
The Prussian attack began in the morning against the Danish left wing. Soon the Danes had to give up Nybøl, and were later thrown out of Stenderup and Bøffelkobbel. The Danish left wing had to withdraw all the way back to Dybbøl to take a new position there. During this attack the Prussian line brigade had gathered so far back, that General Wrangel had to order the otherwise victorious attack to be stopped to give the line brigade time to reach the battle line.

The break of the attack meant that there was time to put the Danish reserves from Als into the battle, and thereby strengthen the Dybbøl position. In the meantime, there had been fierce fighting during the Danish withdrawal. The Dybbøl position was now strengthened enough, that the Prussian attack collapsed. Around 18:30, General Wrangel ordered a retreat - and just at that time a Danish counterattack was launched. The Danish units charged forward and drove the Prussians back to Nybøl. A Prussian eyewitness wrote about the attack: "Like a blood-red cloud, threatening with destruction, the Danish forces tumbled down over the bank". However, the Danes did not follow up the victory, as it was expected that the Prussians would attack again the next day with their unused reserves - this would mean a clear German superiority.

== Consequences ==
Shortly after the battle, a ceasefire was concluded in Malmö after Swedish mediation. The advance of the Danish army was interrupted, which gave the Germans the opportunity to retreat in good order.
