= Battle of Nybøl =

- Part of the First Schleswig War
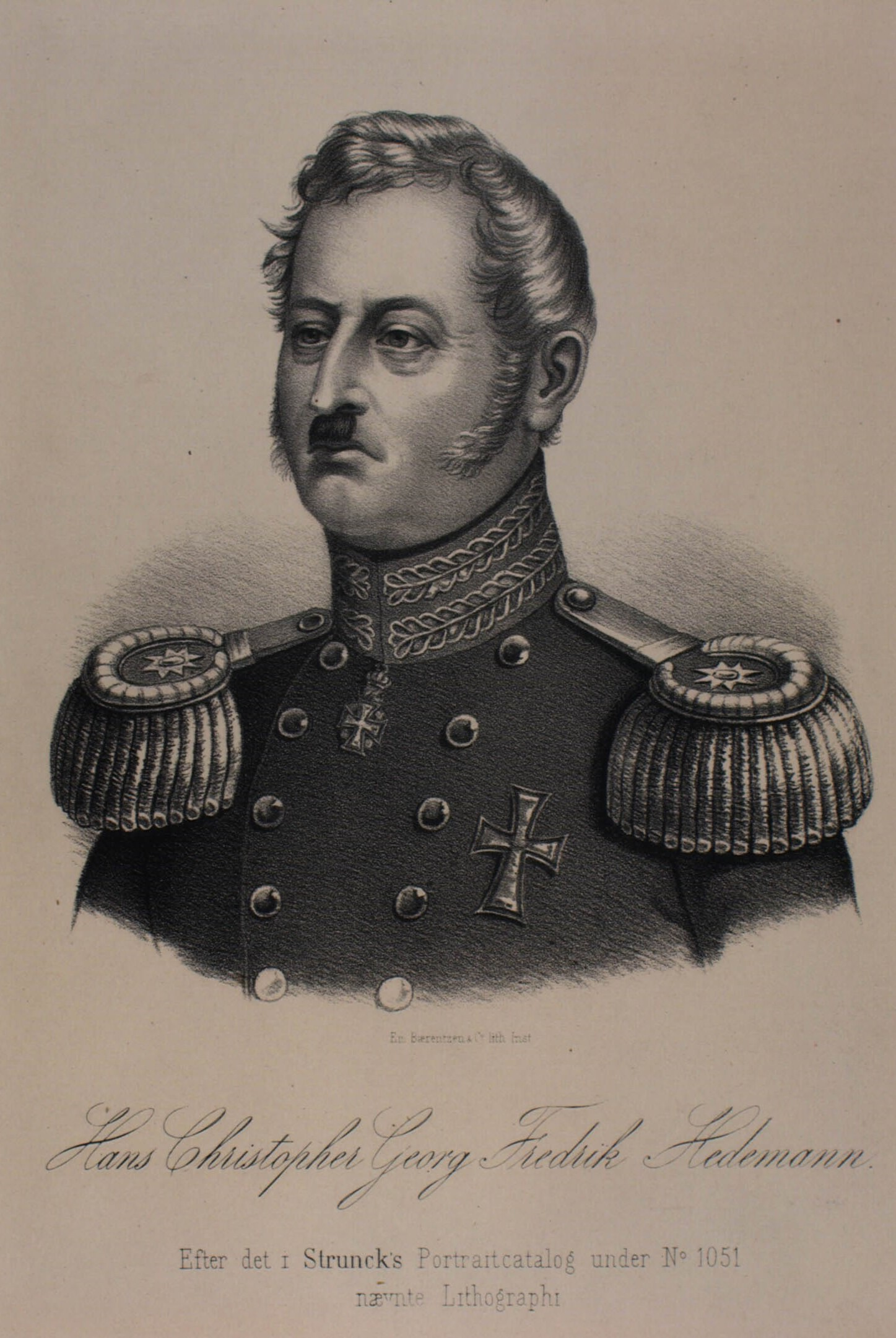
- Hans Hedemann
Date	28 May 1848
Location	Nybøl Parish, Sundeved
Result	Danish victory

Belligerents
Hanover	Denmark

Commanders and leaders
(Kingdom of Hanover) Hugh Halkett (Kingdom of Hanover) Cæsar du Plat (Kingdom of Hanover) Carl Friedrich Jürgen Peter Abercron	(Denmark) Hans Hedemann (Denmark) Friderich Adolph Schleppegrell (Denmark) Frederik Rubeck Bülow

Strength
7,000	14,000

Casualties and losses
225 killed & wounded	150 killed & wounded

The Battle of Nybøl was fought on 28 May 1848 between the Danish Army and Germans in Sundeved. The Danes were victorious.

== Bibliography ==
- Johs. Nielsen, Treårskrigen 1848-1851 1993 ISBN 87-89022-03-3
- Hans Christian Bjerg; Ole L. Frantzen (2005). Danmark i krig. Gyldendals Bogklubber/Politikens Forlag. ISBN 87-03-00990-4.
