= First Schleswig War =

1848–1851 war between Denmark and Prussia

- Part of the revolutions of 1848
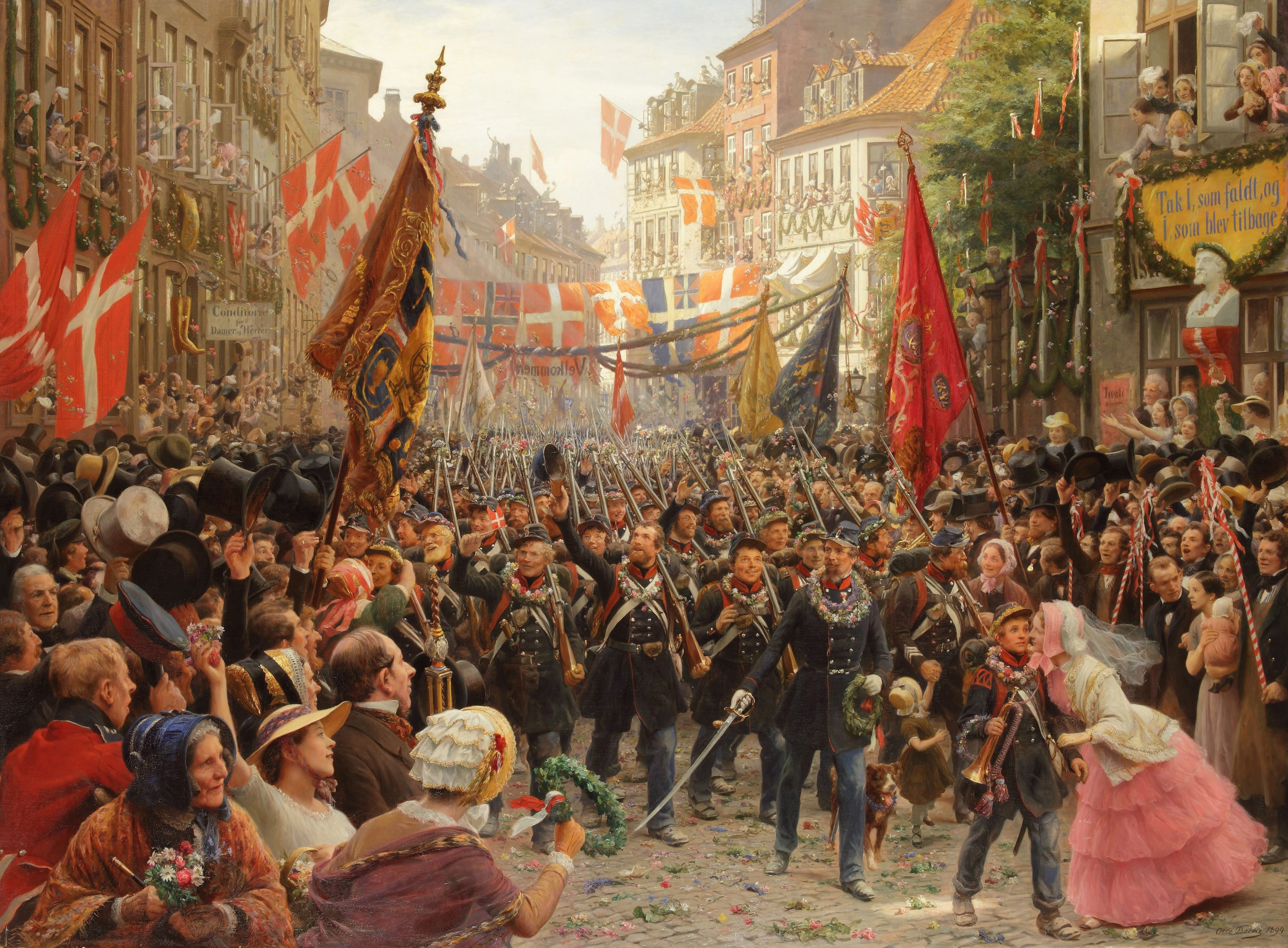
- Danish soldiers return to Copenhagen in 1849 by Otto Bache (1894)
Date	24 March 1848 – 8 May 1852 (4 years, 1 month and 2 weeks)
Location	Schleswig and Jutland
Result	Danish victory
Territorial changes	Status quo ante bellum

Belligerents
German Confederation; Schleswig; Holstein; Prussia; Saxony; Hanover; Mecklenburg-Schwerin	Denmark

Commanders and leaders
(German Confederation) Frederick of Noer (Kingdom of Prussia) Friedrich von Wrangel (Kingdom of Prussia) Felix Salm-Salm (Kingdom of Prussia) Karl Wilhelm von Willisen	(Denmark) Frederick VII

Casualties and losses
8,309 killed, wounded or captured	8,695 killed, wounded or captured

The First Schleswig War (German: Schleswig-Holsteinischer Krieg), also known as the Schleswig-Holstein uprising (German: Schleswig-Holsteinische Erhebung) and the Three Years' War (Danish: Treårskrigen), was a military conflict in southern Denmark and northern Germany rooted in the Schleswig–Holstein question: who should control the duchies of Schleswig, Holstein and Lauenburg, which at the time were ruled by the king of Denmark in a personal union. Ultimately, Denmark proved victorious with the diplomatic support of the great powers, especially Britain and Russia, since the duchies were close to an important Baltic seaway connecting both powers.

While Schleswig had been predominantly Danish with a German elite concentrated in the cities and estates, modernisation brought extensive German influence. German became the language of administration, education, and the church, creating an environment in which it was omnipresent and speaking Danish offered no advantages. Due to top-down pressure, many Danish South Schleswigers gradually adopted German in their daily lives. This linguistic shift led to the extinction of the two Danish South Schleswig dialects, Fjoldemål and Angeldanish – first in favour of Low German, and later High German. Over time, these now Low German-speaking South Schleswigers became fully Germanized, came to identify with the German question, and sought to separate Schleswig, along with Holstein, from Denmark entirely. Therefore, by the outbreak of the war, Schleswig was divided: a Danish-speaking North and a Low German-speaking South, while Holstein and Lauenburg were entirely ethnically German.

In March 1848, the Low German-speaking population of Schleswig, Holstein, and Lauenburg rebelled, and created a provisional government and army. As Holstein and Lauenburg were member states, the German Confederation supported the rebels as a federal war (Bundeskrieg) according to its statutes. This was continued by the German Central Government (of the federal state that replaced the Confederation in 1848/49–51), with most of the German troops being provided by Prussia.

The war was interrupted in August 1848 by the armistice of Malmö, but started again with a Danish offensive in February 1849. In the summer of 1850, Prussia had to back down and leave the rebels to their fate. On 1 April 1851, the Schleswig-Holstein army was disbanded. The London Protocol of 1852 was the final settlement of the conflict with the great powers confirming the Danish king to be the duke of the duchies but also declaring that the duchies had to remain independent from Denmark proper.

== Background ==
At the beginning of 1848, Denmark included the Duchy of Schleswig, and the king of Denmark ruled the duchies of Holstein and Saxe-Lauenburg within the German Confederation. The majority of the ethnic Germans in Denmark lived in these areas. Germans made up a third of the country's population, and the three duchies accounted for half of Denmark's economy. The Napoleonic Wars, which had ended in 1815, had fanned both Danish and German nationalism. Pan-German ideology had become highly influential in the decades prior to the wars, and writers such as Jacob Grimm (1785–1863) and the Norwegian Peter Andreas Munch (1810–1863) argued that the entire peninsula of Jutland had been populated by Germans before the arrival of Danes and that therefore Germans could justifiably reclaim it. Jens Jacob Asmussen Worsaae (1821–1885), an archaeologist who had excavated parts of the Danevirke, countered the pro-German claims, writing pamphlets which argued that there was no way of knowing the language of the earliest inhabitants of Danish territory, that Germans had more solid historical claims to large parts of France and England, and that Slavs by the same reasoning could annex parts of eastern Germany.

The conflicting aims of Danish and German nationalists contributed to the outbreak of the First Schleswig War. Danish nationalists believed that Schleswig, but not Holstein, should be part of Denmark, as Schleswig contained a large number of Danes, whilst Holstein did not. German nationalists believed that Schleswig, Holstein, and Lauenburg should remain united, and their belief that Schleswig and Holstein should not be separated led to the two duchies being referred to as Schleswig-Holstein. Schleswig became a particular source of contention, as it contained a large number of Danes, Germans, and North Frisians. Another cause of the war was the legally questionable change to the rules of ducal succession in the duchies.

King Christian VIII of Denmark died in January 1848. His only legitimate son, the future Frederick VII, seemed unable to beget heirs. Thus the duchies appeared likely to pass to the rule of the House of Oldenburg, which might have resulted in a division of Denmark. Accordingly, Christian VIII had decreed (8 July 1846) a change to the succession law in the duchies to allow succession through the female line. The implementation of this law was illegal.

The question of Schleswig-Holstein was also a major concern of the other European powers. In order to maintain access to the Baltic, the British Foreign Secretary Lord Palmerston preferred that control of the Danish Straits linking the North Sea to the Baltic Sea not be controlled by any major European power such as Prussia. From Palmerston's viewpoint, having a relatively weak power such as Denmark maintain control of the Danish straits was far preferable to having a strong power, and as such Britain tended to support the Danish claims, believing that a Danish-Prussian war might lead to Prussia annexing not just the two duchies, but also all of Denmark. Likewise, Emperor Nicholas I of Russia supported Denmark as he did not want a strong power controlling the Danish straits. Nicholas also believed that if Denmark was defeated even without being annexed, it might lead to Denmark joining a Scandinavian union that would pose a potential threat to the ability of the Baltic fleet of the Imperial Russian Navy to leave the Baltic. France, the European power most opposed to German unification, was due to the revolution of 1848 unable to take a strong stand on German affairs. The Austrian Empire, Prussia's rival for the ascendency in German affairs, was paralyzed as revolts had broken out against the House of Habsburg in Prague, Milan, Buda, Krakow, and in Vienna itself.

In Berlin, the foreign policy decision-making was described as "chaotic" with the weak and indecisive King Fredrich Wilhelm IV receiving conflicting advice from rival groups of advisers about what to do. However, in the aftermath of the revolution of 1848, which had damaged the prestige of the House of Hohenzollern as fighting had broken out in the streets of Berlin, it was felt essential to take a bold foreign policy step which would restore the prestige of the Prussian state. The king and his advisors were not German nationalists, but the German liberals opposed to the absolutist Prussian monarchy were. The king's advisors believed that a German nationalist war would win support for the Prussian state from many of those liberals who were opposed to it.

In addition, the chaos of the revolution of 1848 was felt to offer a unique opportunity to create a greater Prussia by seizing territory, all the more as France was unable to act. However, the king and his advisers were not prepared to risk a general European war over the Schleswig-Holstein question. Joseph von Radowitz, the king's most trusted adviser, wrote in his diary: "The present political-military crisis cannot drag on, it must come to a rapid conclusion". Radowitz was prepared to support a war provided it would be brought to a victorious conclusion swiftly, which would allow Prussia to present the other European powers with a fait accompli. Knowing of the intense Russian opposition to Prussia controlling the Danish straits, Radowitz advised the king to limit the war to the two duchies and not allow Prussian troops to enter Jutland, which he predicted would lead to "unforeseeable consequences" as it was likely that Russia would intervene. The Prussian Foreign Minister Heinrich Alexander von Arnim supported war, believing that Prussia could occupy the two duchies within eight days, leaving Britain and Russia no time to react.

Both Russia and Britain were opposed to Denmark losing control of the Danish straits, but were otherwise supportive of Prussia. Palmerston supported a stronger Prussia and even a Germany unified under Prussian leadership as a way of weakening France. King Friedrich Wilhelm's sister was married to Emperor Nicholas I, and the Prussian king believed that his brother-in-law could be persuaded to accept Prussia seizing control of the two duchies. Furthermore, Nicolas was well known to be an intense admirer of Prussian militarism and saw Prussia as the stronger ally in the so-called informal "eastern bloc" that consisted of Russia, Prussia, and Austria. The emperor saw Prussia as the more reliable partner in opposing Polish nationalism than the Austrian Empire, hence his preference for Prussia over Austria in the "eastern bloc". Nicholas had long made it known that he viewed a Prussian-dominated Germany as a welcome development, which he saw as a way of weakening France, the nation that he hated and feared the most. Fredrich Wilhelm did not want to risk a confrontation with either Britain or Russia, and was only persuaded to act when convinced a war would not cause such a confrontation.

== Trigger ==
Schleswig-Holstein Prince Frederick of Noer took the 5th "Lauenburger" Rifle Corps (Jägerkorps) and some students of Kiel University to take over the fortress of Rendsburg in Schleswig-Holstein. The fortress contained the main armoury of the duchies, the 14th, 15th, and 16th Infantry Battalions, the 2nd Regiment of Artillery, as well as some military engineers. When Noer's force arrived, they found that the gates to the fortress had been left open for an unknown reason and promptly walked in, surprising the would-be defenders. After delivering a speech to the defenders, the prince secured the allegiance of the battalions and regiment of artillery to the provisional government. Danish officers who had been serving in the defence of the fortress were allowed to leave for Denmark on the assurance that they did not fight against Schleswig-Holstein in the coming war.

== Course of the war ==
=== 1848 ===
Wishing to defeat Denmark before German troops arrived to support them, 7,000 Schleswig-Holstein volunteers under General Krohn occupied Flensborg on 31 March. Over 7,000 Danish soldiers landed east of the city, and Krohn, fearing he would be surrounded, ordered his forces to withdraw. The Danes were able to reach the Schleswig-Holsteiners before they were able to retreat, and the subsequent Battle of Bov on 9 April was a Danish victory. At the battle, the Prince of Noer, senior commander of the Schleswig-Holstein forces, did not arrive until two hours after fighting had started, and the Schleswig-Holsteiners were more prepared for the withdrawal they had intended to make than for an engagement.

A timeline of events is shown thus:

- 12 April: The German Confederate Diet recognizes the provisional government of Schleswig and commissions Prussia to enforce its decrees. General Wrangel is also ordered to occupy the city of Schleswig.
- 19 April: Prussian troops cross the Dannevirke into Schleswig
- 23 April: Prussian victory in the Battle of Schleswig
- 23 April: German victory in the Battle of Mysunde
- 24 April: Hanoverian victory in the Skirmish of Oversø
- 2 May: Capture of Fredericia by Prussian forces
- 27 May: Battle of Sundeved
- 28 May: Battle of Nybøl
- 5 June: Danish victory in the Battle of Dybbøl
- 7 June: Battle of Hoptrup
- 30 June: Battle of Bjerning

The Germans embarked on this course of participation in the First Schleswig War alone, without assistance from other European powers, who were united in opposing any dismemberment of Denmark, with even the Austrians refusing to assist the Germans. Sweden landed 7,000 troops on the island of Fyn opposite Jutland to assist the Danes, and Nicholas I of Russia, speaking with authority as head of the senior Gottorp line, pointed out to Frederick William IV of Prussia the risks of a collision. The British government threatened to send the Royal Navy to assist in preserving the status quo, though this threat did not ultimately materialise.

It was Russian diplomatic intervention that decided the outcome of the war in April 1848. The Russian ambassador in Berlin, Baron Peter von Meyendorff, delivered a note to King Friedrich Wilhelm stating that Russia regarded the advance of the Prussian troops towards Jutland as an extremely unfriendly act as the note stated:

The invasion, intended for Jutland, seriously injuries the interests of all the powers bordering on the Baltic, and stretches to the breaking point the political equilibrium throughout the north which was established in the treaties.

To reinforce the point, the empress of Russia wrote to her brother, King Friedrich Wilhelm, saying:

It is your troops who have grabbed the weak Denmark with their superior force. The war can be expanded widely if you pursue it. Stop! There is still time! Think about the difficulties Germany has to battle in order to bring about inner security, the dangers which threaten in the West. Do not force upon the Tsar the necessity to come to the assistance with strong measures of another state whose downfall Russia cannot regard with indifference and will not tolerate. It cannot come to pass that Denmark is absorbed into Germany; of this you can be certain.

Nicholas ordered Russia to mobilise, sent a squadron of the Russian Baltic fleet to Danish waters as a show of support, and politely told his brother-in-law he was willing to risk war over the issue. The Russian threats had the desired impact on Friedrich Wilhelm who now claimed to have been misled by von Arnim into intervening in the war.

The fact that Prussia had entered the war on behalf of the revolutionary forces in Schleswig-Holstein created a great number of ironies. The newly elected Frankfurt Diet tended to support the incursion into the Schleswig-Holstein War while King Frederick William did not. Indeed, Frederick William ordered Friedrich von Wrangel, commanding the German army, to withdraw his troops from the duchies; but the general refused, asserting that he followed order from the new German Central Government and not of the King of Prussia. Wrangel proposed that, at the very least, any treaty concluded should be presented for ratification to the German National Assembly.

Furthermore, on 7 August 1848, Archduke John, as head of the Provisional Central Power, published three additional demands upon the Danes:

1. That persons to be elected for the formation of a new common government for the duchies of Holstein and Schleswig, before the conclusion of the armistice, are expressly and specifically agreed among the contracting parties in such a way that the existence and the prosperous effectiveness of the new government are guaranteed;
2. That in the duchies, existing laws and ordinances mentioned in Article VII. all are expressly permitted up to the conclusion of the armistice;
3. That troops remaining in the duchies of Holstein and Schleswig under Article VIII shall all be under the orders of the German commander-in-chief (Wrangel).

The Danes rejected this proposal outright and negotiations were broken off.

Prussia was now confronted on the one side by German nationalists urging it to action, on the other side by the European powers threatening dire consequences should it persist. After painful hesitation, Frederick William chose what seemed the lesser of two evils, and, on 26 August, Prussia signed a convention at Malmö which yielded to practically all the Danish demands. The Holstein estates appealed to the German National Assembly, which hotly took up their cause, but it was soon clear that the German Central Government had no means of enforcing its views. In the end the convention was ratified at Frankfurt. The convention was essentially nothing more than a truce establishing a temporary modus vivendi. The main issues, left unsettled, continued to be hotly debated.

In October, at a conference in London, Denmark suggested an arrangement on the basis of a separation of Schleswig from Holstein, despite their historical affiliation dating back to 1460, with Schleswig having a separate constitution under the Danish crown.

=== 1849 ===
- 27 January: The London conference's result is supported by Great Britain and Russia and accepted by Prussia and the German parliament in Frankfurt. The negotiations break down, however, on the refusal of Denmark to yield the principle of the indissoluble union with the Danish crown.
- 23 February: The truce comes to an end.
- 3 April: The war is renewed. At this point Nicholas I intervenes in favour of peace. Prussia, conscious of its restored strength and weary of the intractable temper of the Frankfurt parliament, determines to take matters into its own hands.
- 3 April: Danish victory in the Battle of Adsbøl.
- 5 April: Battle of Eckernförde
- 6 April: Battles at Ullerup and Avnbøl.
- 13 April: Danish victory in the Battle of Dybbøl.
- 23 April: Battle of Kolding.
- 31 May: The Danes stop a Prussian advance through Jutland in a cavalry clash at Vejlby.
- 4 June: inconclusive Battle of Heligoland (1849)
- 6 July: Danish victory in the Battle of Fredericia.
- 10 July: Another truce is signed. Schleswig, until the peace, is to be administered separately, under a mixed commission; Holstein is to be governed by a viceregent of the German Empire (an arrangement equally offensive to German and Danish sentiment). A settlement seemed as far off as ever. The Danes still clamoures for the principle of succession in the female line and union with Denmark, the Germans for that of succession in the male line and union with Holstein.

=== 1850 ===
In April 1850, Prussia, which had pulled out of the war after the treaty of Malmö, proposed a definitive peace on the basis of the status quo ante bellum and postponement of all questions as to mutual rights. To Palmerston the basis seemed meaningless and the proposed settlement would settle nothing. Nicholas I, openly disgusted with Frederick William's submission to the Frankfurt Parliament, again intervened. To him Duke Christian of Augustenborg was a rebel. Russia had guaranteed Schleswig to the Danish crown by the 1773 Treaty of Tsarskoye Selo. As for Holstein, if the King of Denmark could not deal with the rebels there, he himself would intervene as he had done in Hungary. The threat was reinforced by the menace of the European situation. Austria and Prussia were on the verge of war (see Autumn Crisis 1850), and the sole hope of preventing Russia from entering such a war on the side of Austria lay in settling the Schleswig-Holstein question in a manner desirable to it. The only alternative, an alliance with the hated Napoleon Bonaparte's nephew, Louis Napoleon, who was already dreaming of acquiring the Rhine frontier for France in return for his aid in establishing German sea-power by the ceding of the duchies, was abhorrent to Frederick William.

- 8 April: Karl Wilhelm von Willisen becomes the Supreme Commander of the German forces.
- 2 July: A treaty of peace between Prussia and Denmark is signed at Berlin. Both parties reserve all their antecedent rights. Denmark is satisfied that the treaty empowered the King of Denmark to restore his authority in Holstein with or without the consent of the German Confederation. Danish troops now march in to coerce the refractory duchies. While the fighting goes on, negotiations among the powers continue.
- 24–25 July: Danish victory in the Battle of Idstedt.
- 28 July: Danish victory in cavalry clash at Jagel.
- 2 August: Great Britain, France, Russia and Sweden-Norway sign a protocol, to which Austria subsequently adheres, approving the principle of restoring the integrity of the Danish monarchy.
- 12 September: Battle of Mysunde.
- 4 October: Danish forces resist German siege of Friedrichstadt.
- 24 November: Battle of Lottorf
- 31 December: Skirmish at Möhlhorst.

=== 1851 ===
- May: The Copenhagen government makes an abortive attempt to come to an understanding with the inhabitants of the duchies by convening an assembly of notables at Flensburg.
- 6 December 1851: The Copenhagen government announces a project for the future organization of the monarchy on the basis of the equality of its constituent states, with a common ministry.

=== 1852 ===
- 28 January: A royal letter announced the institution of a unitary state which, while maintaining the fundamental constitution of Denmark, would increase the parliamentary powers of the estates of the two duchies. This proclamation is approved by Prussia and Austria, and by the German confederal diet insofar as it affected Holstein and Lauenburg. The question of the Augustenborg succession makes an agreement between the powers impossible.
- 31 March: The Duke of Augustenborg resigns his claim in return for a money payment. Further adjustments follow.
- 8 May: another London Protocol is signed. The international treaty that becomes known as the "London Protocol" is the revision of the earlier protocol, which has been ratified on 2 August 1850, by the major German powers, Austria and Prussia. The second, actual London Protocol is recognized by the five major European powers (the Austrian Empire, the Second French Republic, the Kingdom of Prussia, the Russian Empire, and the United Kingdom (Great Britain and Ireland), as well as the two major Baltic Sea powers of Denmark and The United Kingdom of Sweden-Norway.

The Protocol affirmed the integrity of the Danish federation as a "European necessity and standing principle". Accordingly, the duchies of Schleswig (a Danish fief), and Holstein and Lauenburg (sovereign states within the German Confederation) were joined by personal union with the King of Denmark. For this purpose, the line of succession to the duchies was modified, because Frederick VII of Denmark remained childless and hence a change in dynasty was in order. (The originally conflicting protocols of succession between the duchies and Denmark would have stipulated that, contrary to the treaty, the duchies of Holstein and Lauenburg would have had heads of state other than the King of Denmark.) Further, it was affirmed that the duchies were to remain as independent entities, and that Schleswig would have no greater constitutional affinity to Denmark than Holstein.

This settlement did not resolve the issue, as the German Diet had steadfastly refused to recognize the treaty, and asserted that the law of 1650 was still in force, by which the Duchies were not united to the state of Denmark, but only to the direct line of the Danish kings, and were to revert on its extinction, not to the branch of Glucksburg, but to the German ducal family of Augustenburg. Only twelve years passed before the Second Schleswig War in 1864 resulted in the king of Denmark transferring the disputed duchies to Austria and Prussia.

== See also ==
- German exonyms for places in Denmark
- History of Schleswig-Holstein
- Revolutions of 1848
- Wars and battles involving Prussia
