= Christians Brygge =

Street and waterfront in Copenhagen, Denmark

Coordinates: 55.6731°N 12.5811°E

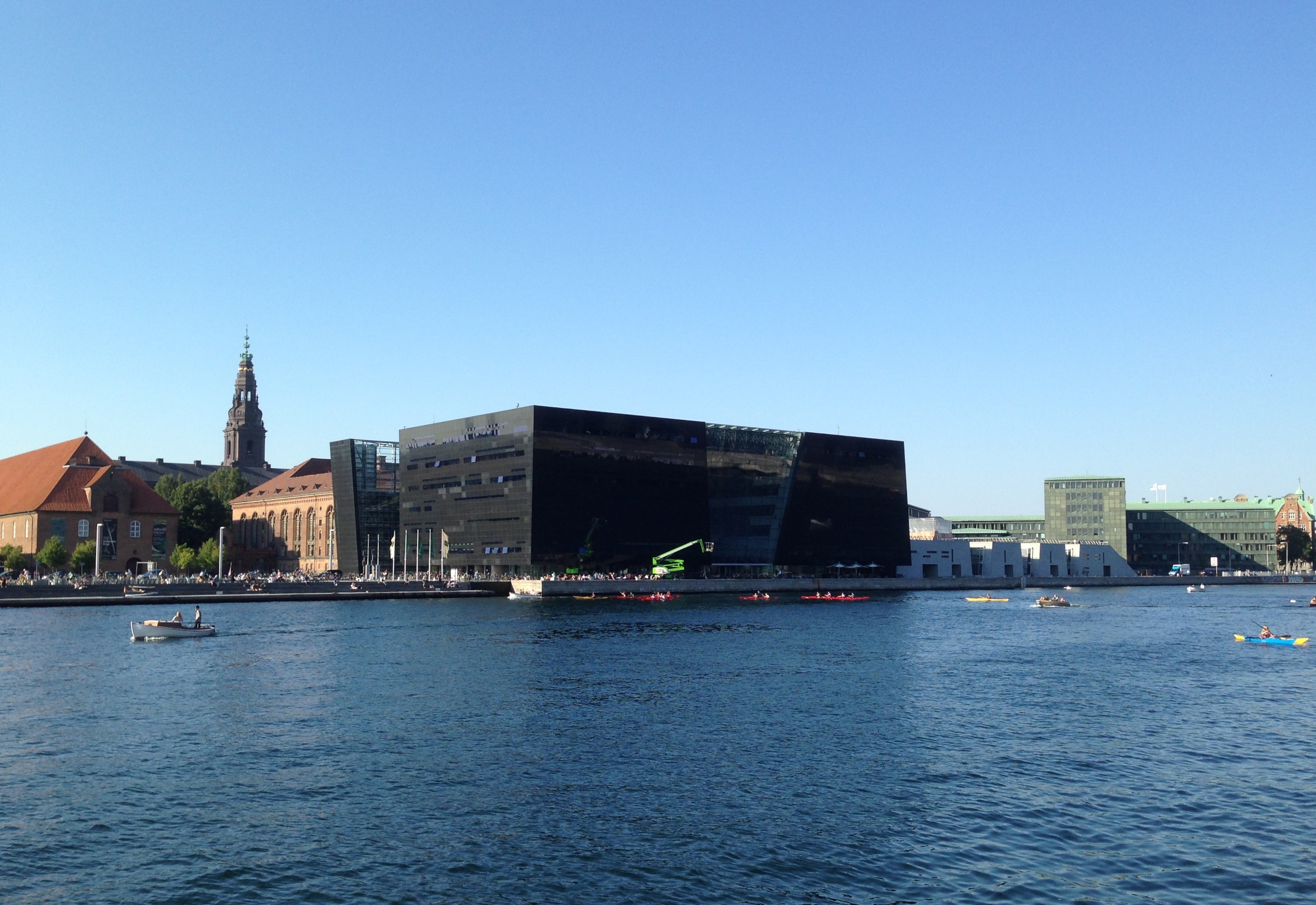
Christians Brygge seen from the other side of the harbour

Christians Brygge (lit. 'Christian's Quay') is a waterfront and street in central Copenhagen, Denmark. It runs from the mouth of Slotsholmen Canal in the north to Langebro Bridge in the south where it turns into Kalvebod Brygge. Its northern end, which is located on the small isle of Slotsholmen, is connected to Niels Juels Gade and then Holmens Kanal by Christian IV's Bridge. Christians Brygge The road section is part of Ring 2. The name refers to Christian IV, king of Denmark during the first half of the 17th century, who constructed several buildings at the site, including the Arsenal (now home to the Royal Danish Arsenal Museum) and Christian IV's Brewhouse as well as nearby Børsen. Other landmarks along the quay include the Royal Danish Library and the mixed-use building BLOX, home to the Danish Architecture Centre.

== History ==
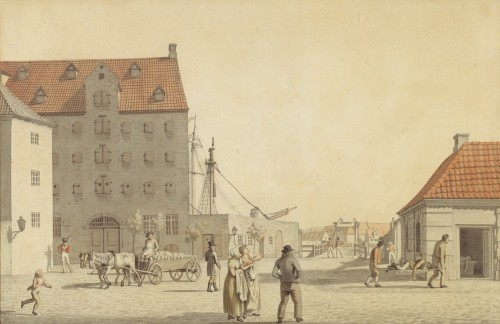
Langebro with the House of the Drowned to the right seen on a drawing by Eckersberg from 1809

Christians Brygge was built in connection with the filling of the Arsenal Dock in 1868. The street was then called Christiansgade. The street only continued to present-day Vester Voldgade where the Rysensteen Bastion of Copenhagen's old West Rampart had still not been removed.

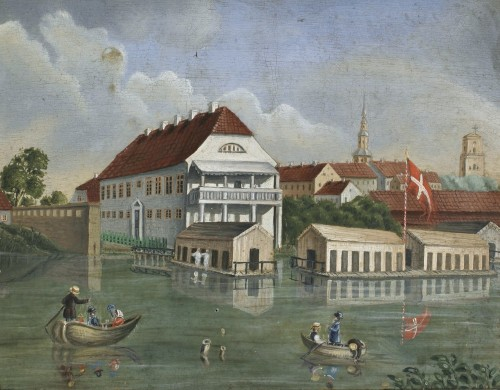
Rysensteen Public Sea Bath in the 1830s

Back when the new quay was constructed, Langebro Bridge was located at the end of Vester Voldgade. Next to the bridge stood the House of the Drowned (Druknehuset). Built in 1806, it was used for storing of unidentified victims of drowning while they awaited identification. Rysensteen Public Sea Bath was located at Rysensteen Bastion. Another building located at the new street was the royal brewery, Kongens Bryghus, which had originally been based in a former military structure on Slotsholmen but moved to a new building on the other side of Frederiksholms Kanal in 1771.

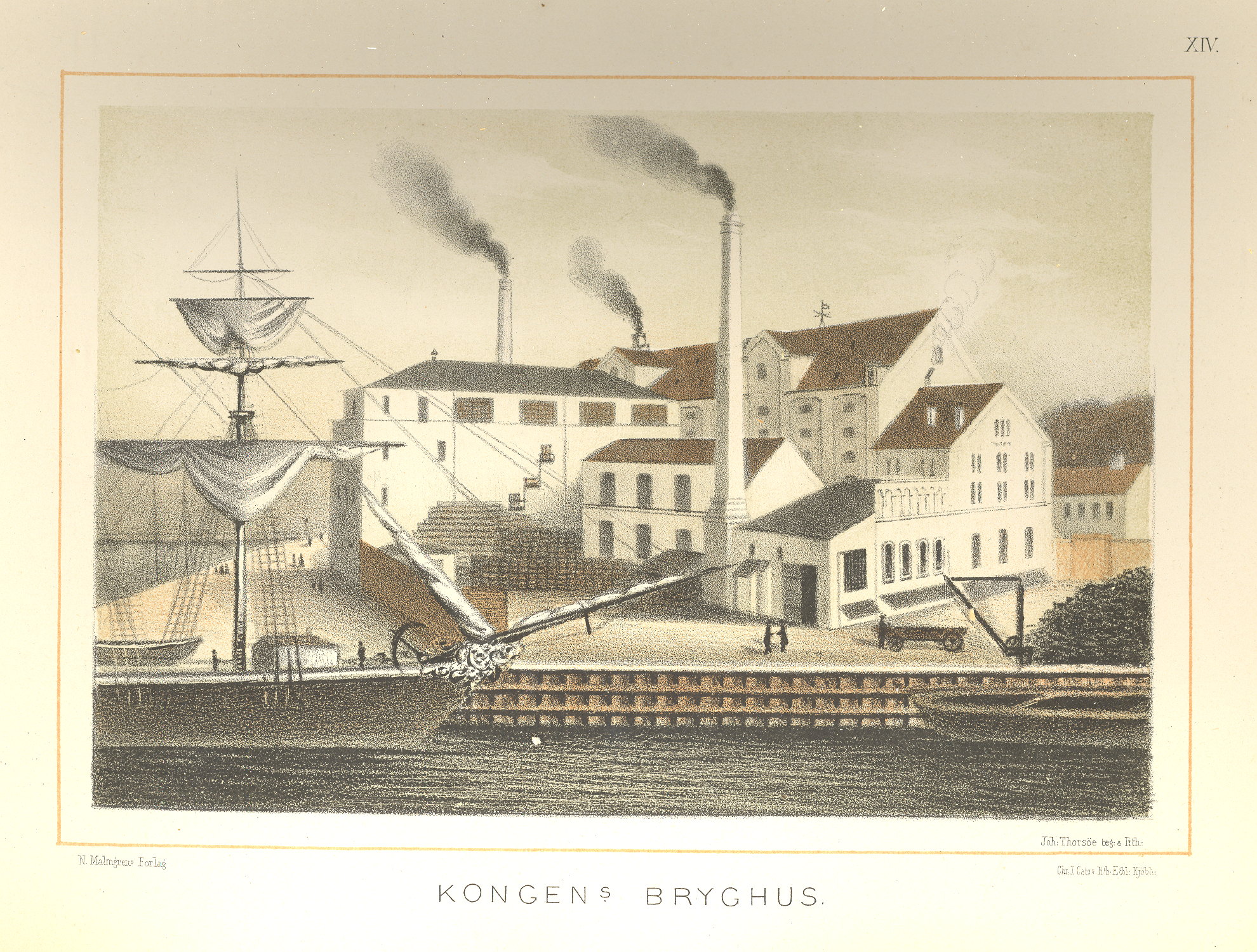
Kongens Bryghus

Christiansgade was extended when the Western Rampart was removed and connected to the new West Boulevard (now H. C. Andersens Boulevard) which was laid out in 1890. Langebro Bridge was moved to the West Boulevard in 1902. The House of the Drowned was demolished in 1902 while the Rysensteen Public Sea Bath was dismantled and partly rebuilt on the other side of the harbor in 1905.

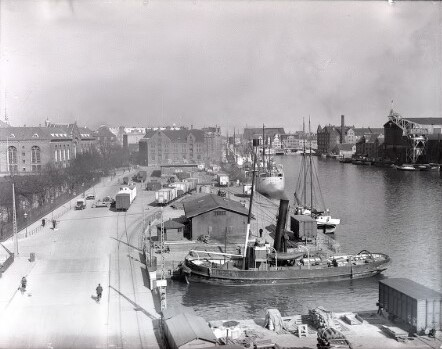
Christians Brygge

The new Langebro Bridge, which opened in 1954, passed over Christiansgade, turning Kalvebod Brygge-Christiansgade into an uninterrupted thoroughfare. The street name was changed from Christiansgade to Christians Brygge in connection with the construction of Christian IV's Bridge in 1963.

== Notable buildings ==
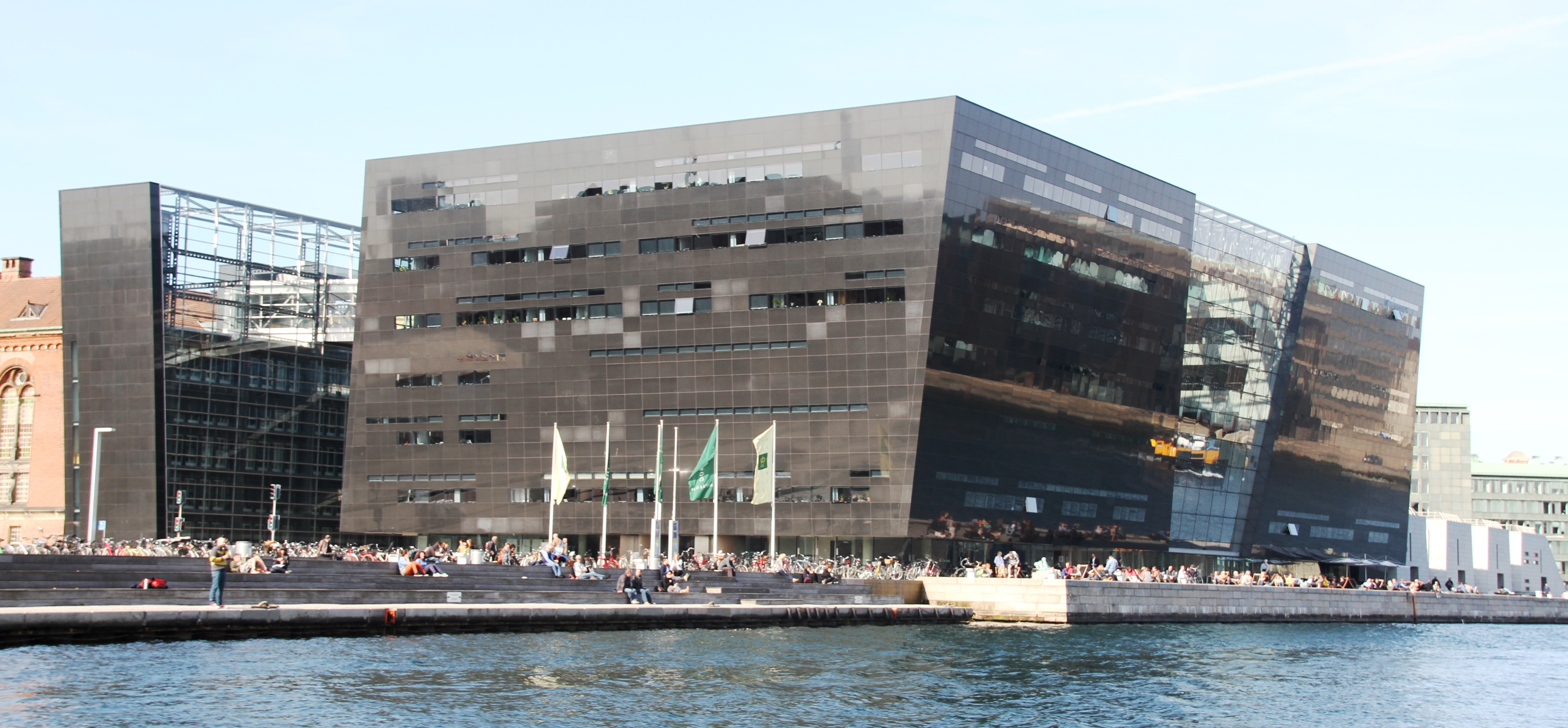
The Black Diamond

The Black Diamond, designed by schmidt hammer lassen is a modern extension for the Royal Danish Library which opened in 1999. Two glazed skyways span the street.

The complex known as Tjæreborg, lit. tar castle/fortress from its dark appearance with a facade of green marble and copper, (Christians Brygge 6) was built by the architects Thomas Havning and Svenn Eske Kristensen from 1961 to 1968. It houses the Ministry of Justice.

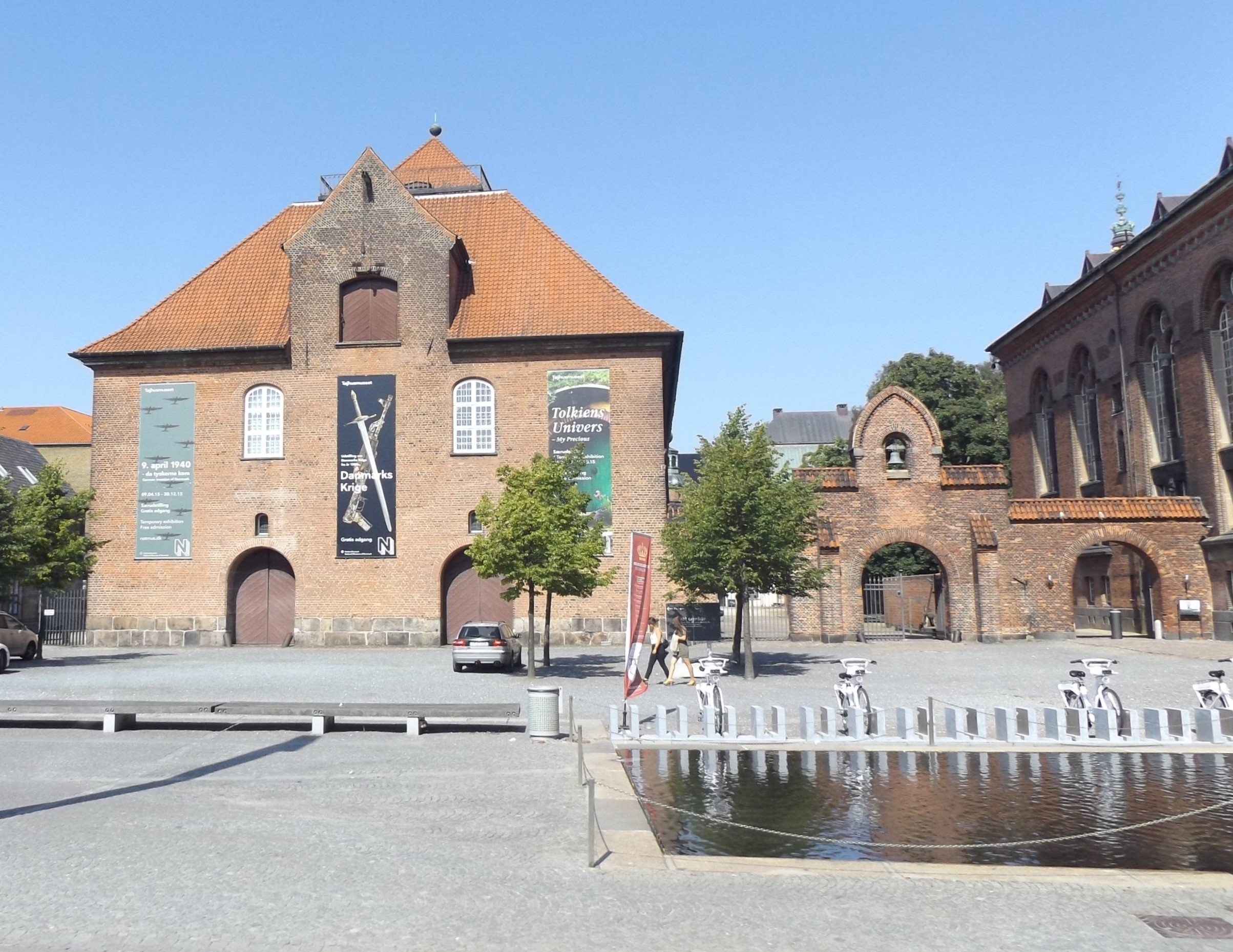
Royal Danish Arsenal Museum

Two cobbled alleys, one on each side of the Royal Library Garden, connect Christiansbrygge to Christiansborg and the street Tøjhusgade. They are accessed through a gate on each side of the Black Diamond. The one to the right is called Proviantgårdspassagen after Proviantgården. Christian IV's Arsenal (Christians Brygge 12) on the other side of the Royal Library Garden, is now home to the Royal Danish Arsenal Museum.

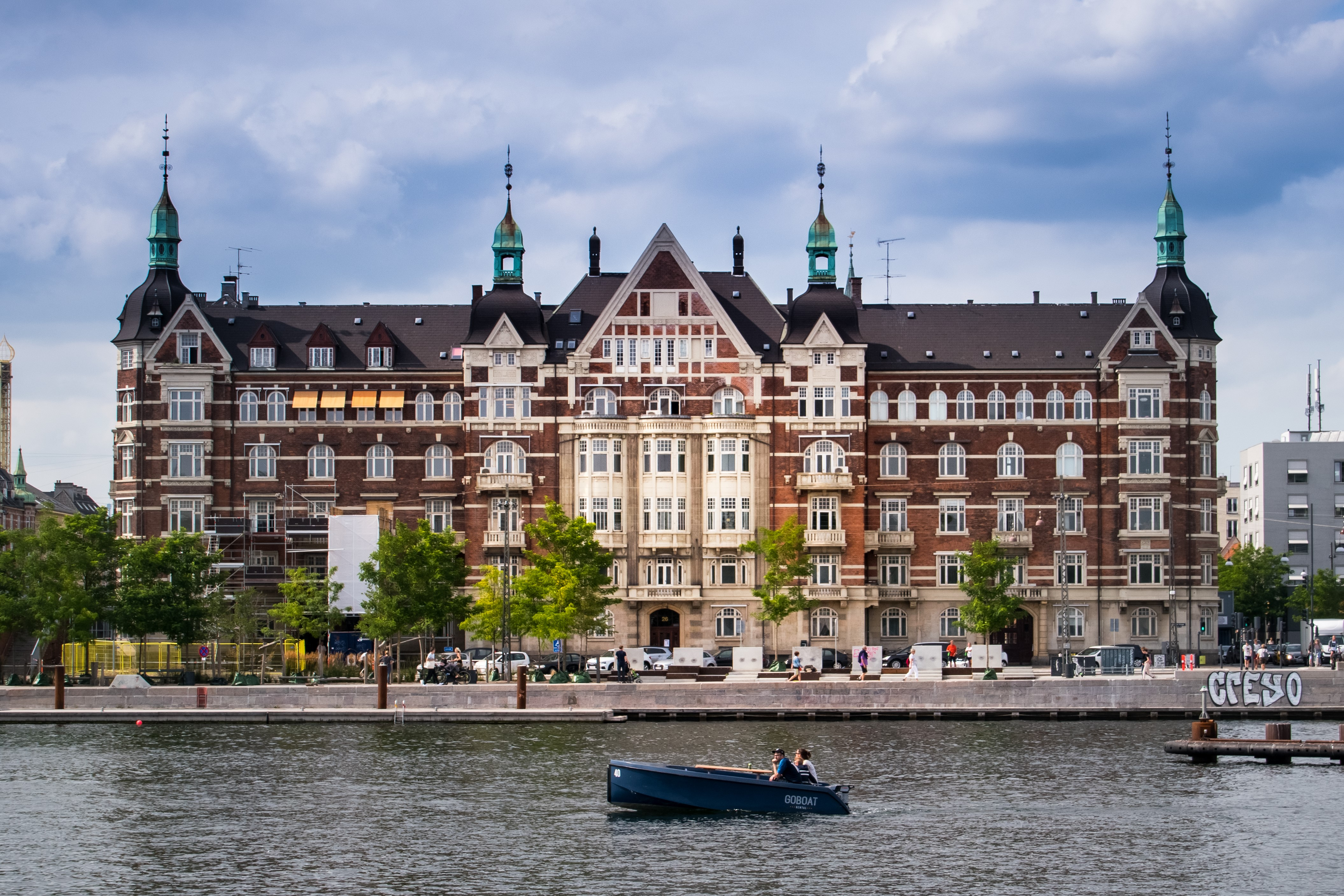
Ny Christiansborg seen from Langebro Bridge

The Historicist office building Ny Christiansborg (No. 26) is from 1907 and was designed by Knud Arne Petersen. One of the occupants is the American Chamber of Commerce.

BLOX, a mixed-use building designed by Rem Koolhaas, is currently (2016) under construction on the so-called Brewhouse Site. The building spans the street and is built by Realdania to create more activity in the area. It will house the Danish Architecture Centre and Realdania as well as restaurants and apartments.

== Public art ==
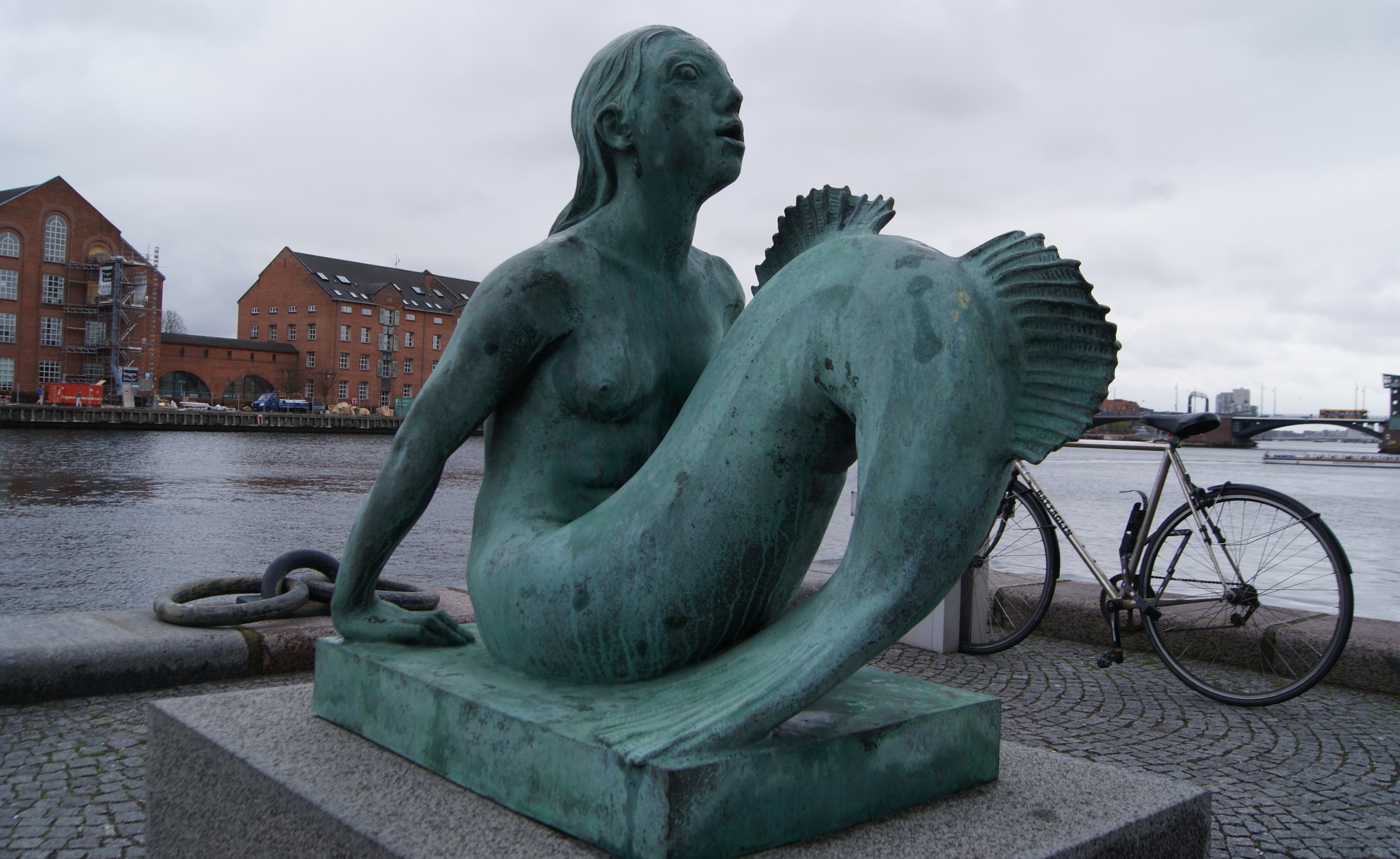
Anne Marie Carl-Nielsen's Mermaid sculpture

On Søren Kierkegårds Plads stands Elisabeth Toubro's non-figurative sculpture Urban Fractal from 2000. The square is also the site of a water feature by Mogens Møller.

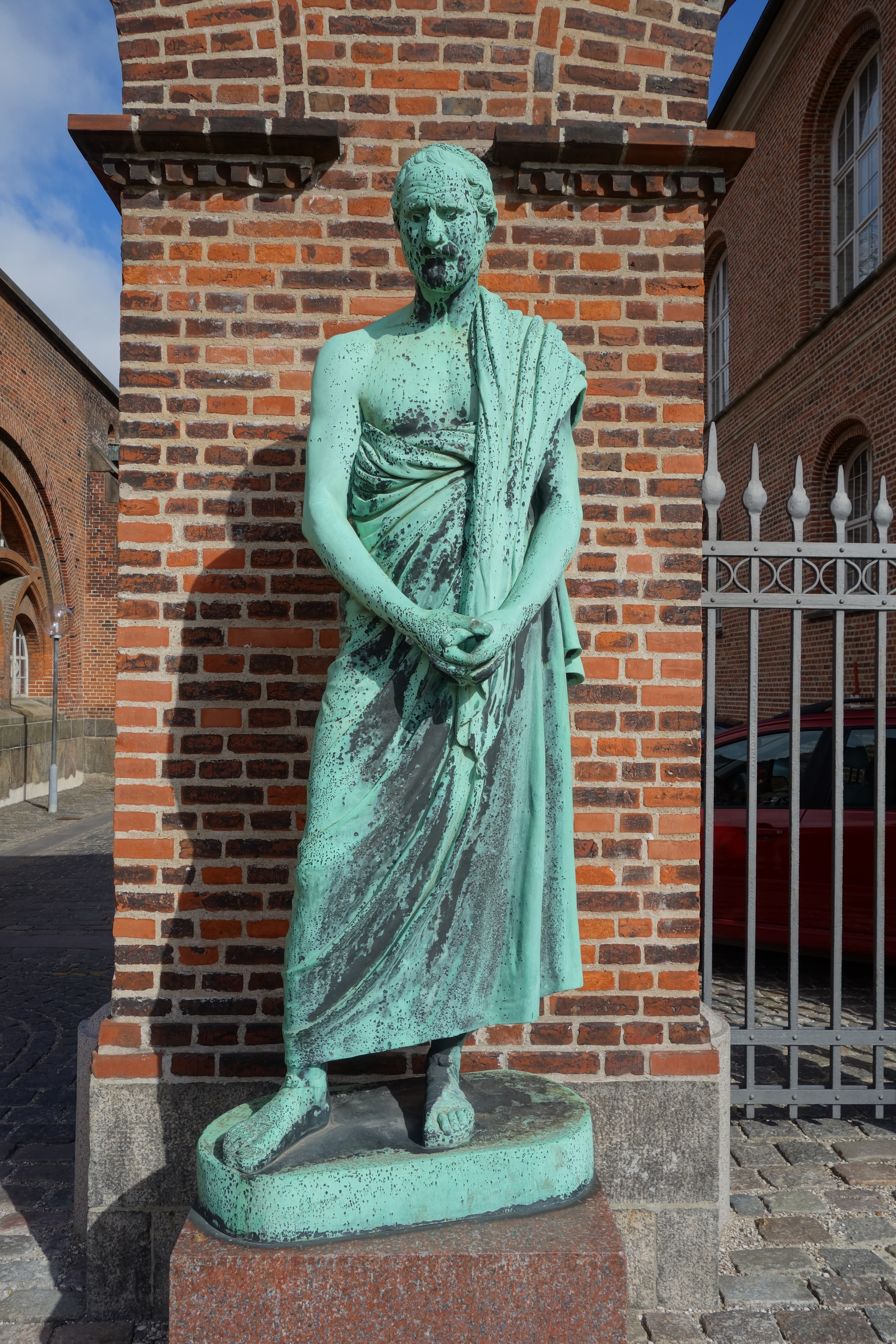
Demosthenes

A bronze cast of Anne Marie Carl-Nielsen's 1921 sculpture Mermaid was installed on the waterfront outside the Black Diamond in 2009. The location was once known as the Mermaid Bank. The cast was a gift to the Royal Danish Library from the Carl Nielsen and Anne Marie Carl-Nielsen Foundation. The Royal Danish Library contains all Carl Nielsen's musical scores and letters including the almost 500 letters from his wife Anne Marie. Carl-Nielsen depicts her mermaid in a more dramatic pose than that of Edvard Eriksen's far more famous and nine years older Little Mermaid at the Langelinie promenade further to the north.

A bronze cast of a Greek statue of Demosthenes stands outside the gate to Proviantgårdspassagen. Herman Wilhelm Bissen's Isted Lion was formerly located in front of the gable of the Royal Arsenal Museum but it was returned to its original location in Flensburg Cemetery in 2011.

== Transport ==
=== Cycling and pedestrians ===
A new bicycle path is as of 2015 under construction along the quay. It will be part of Havneringen (The Harbour Circle), a 13-kilometre cycling and footpath around the central part of Copenhagen Harbour. It is expected to open in 2016. A new underpass, which is part of the BLOX project, will make it easier for pedestrians to access the waterfront.

=== Water transportation ===
The Copenhagen Harbour Buses have stops both at the Black Diamond and at Christian IV's Bridge.

== Cultural references ==
Druknehuset is the title of a 2008 historical crime novel by Maria Helleberg.

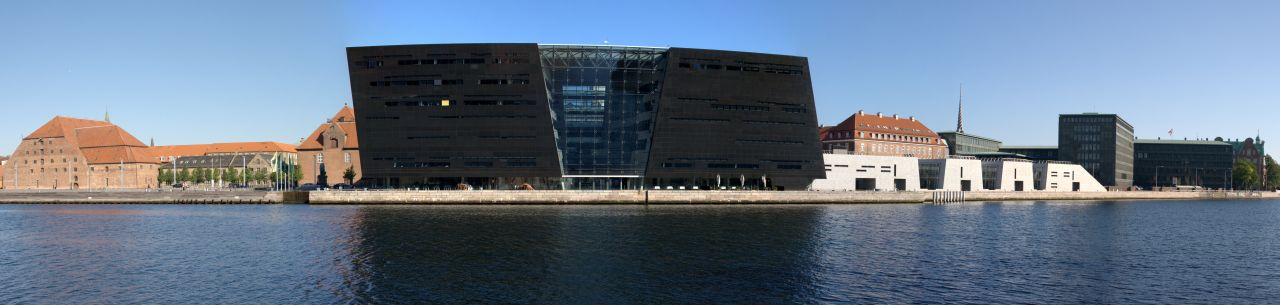
Christians Brygge viewed from the other side of the harbour
