= Herman Wilhelm Bissen =

Danish sculptor (1798–1868)

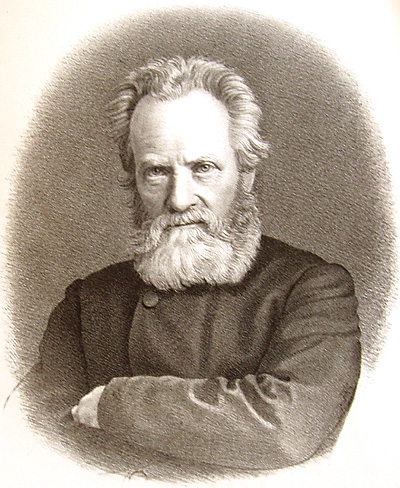
- Born: 13 October 1798; Schleswig, Duchy of Schleswig
- Died: 10 March 1868 (aged 69); Copenhagen, Denmark
- Education: Royal Danish Academy of Fine Arts
- Known for: Sculpture
- Notable work: Isted Lion (Istedløven)
- Movement: Danish Golden Age, Neoclassicism
- Awards: Order of the Dannebrog

Signature
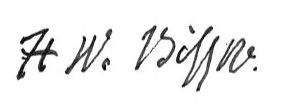

Herman Wilhelm Bissen (13 October 1798 – 10 March 1868) was a Danish sculptor. Bissen created a number of public works, working in plaster, marble and bronze.

The National Gallery of Denmark owns a collection of over two hundred of his works, including over one hundred busts. Among his notable works are the monumental Landsoldaten (1858) in Fredericia, the statue of Adam Oehlenschläger (1854–61) in front of the Royal Danish Theatre in Copenhagen, and the equestrian statue of King Frederik VII of Denmark in front of Christiansborg Castle.

== Biography ==
Bissen studied at the Royal Danish Academy of Fine Arts in Copenhagen from 1816 to 1823. In 1824, he was awarded a travel scholarship which enabled him to travel to Rome. The stay in Rome extended over 10 years during which time he became an assistant to Danish sculptor Bertel Thorvaldsen. Under the influence of Thorvaldsen, his style changed from romanticism to neo-classicism.

In early 1834, Bissen left Rome to return to Copenhagen where he was awarded a professorship at the Royal Danish Academy of Fine Arts following the death of his predecessor, Hermann Ernst Freund. From 1850 to 1853, he was director of the academy. Several of his works were exhibited at the Great Exhibition of 1851 including his statue of Orestes.

His monument from 1862, Isted Lion (Istedløven), was erected in recognition of Danish victory during the Battle of Isted which was fought as part of the First Schleswig War. The statue was originally erected at Flensburg in Schleswig. In 1867, it was moved to Berlin and remained there until 1945. After World War II, it was located to Søren Kierkegaards Plads in Copenhagen. In September 2011 it returned to Flensburg.

== Personal life ==
Bissen was born at Schleswig in the Duchy of Schleswig. He was the son of Christian Gottlieb Wilhelm Bissen (1766–1847), a farmer, and Anna Margrethe Dorothea Elfendal (1763–1848).

Bissen was married twice. In 1836, he married Emilie Hedvig Møller. She died in 1850 and two years later, and he remarried to Marie Cathrine Sonne. He was the father of sculptor Vilhelm Bissen and landscape painter Rudolf Bissen. Bissen died of pneumonia in 1868. His funeral took place at the Vor Frue Kirke in Copenhagen and was followed by his burial at Assistens Cemetery.

== Works ==
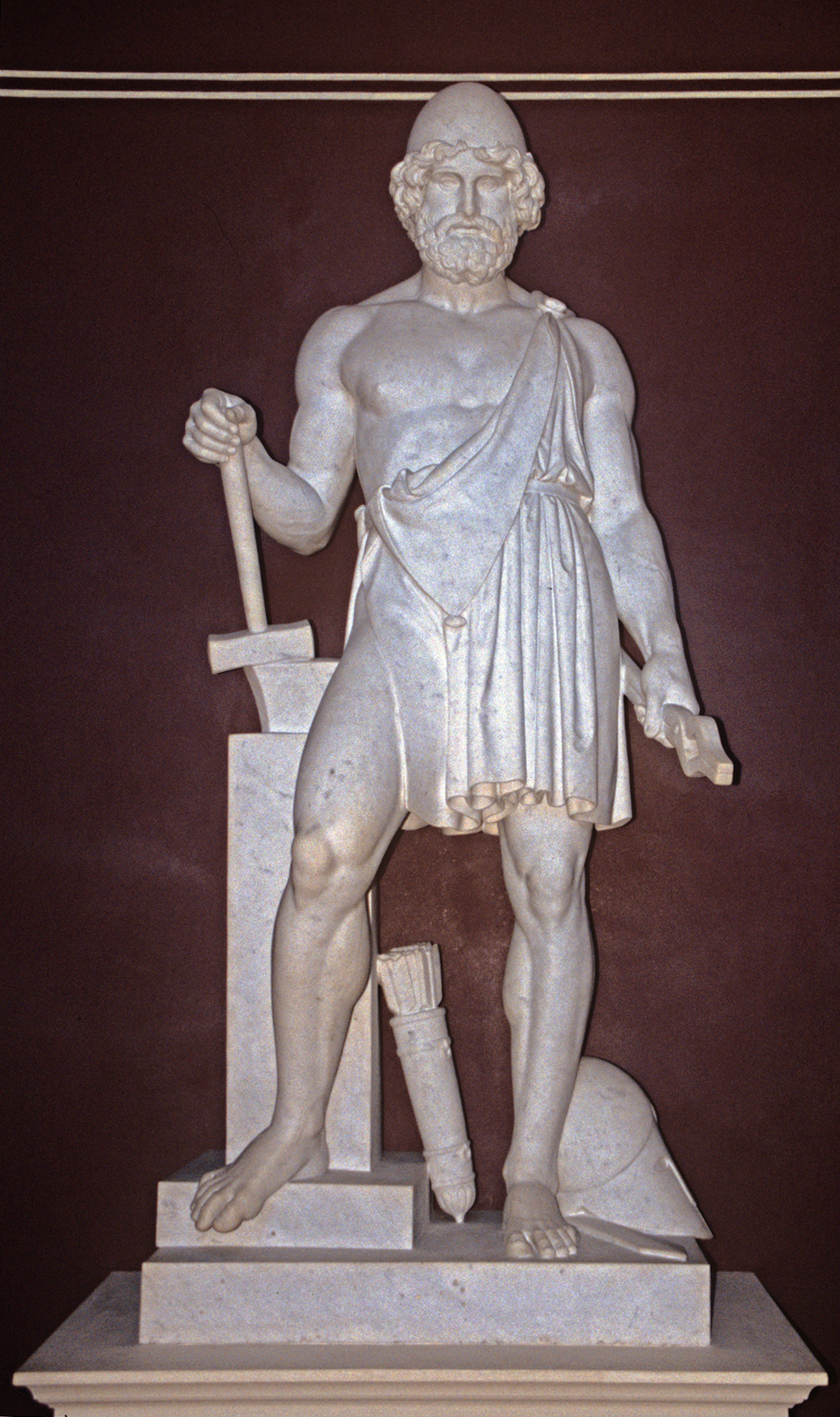
Vulcan (1838)

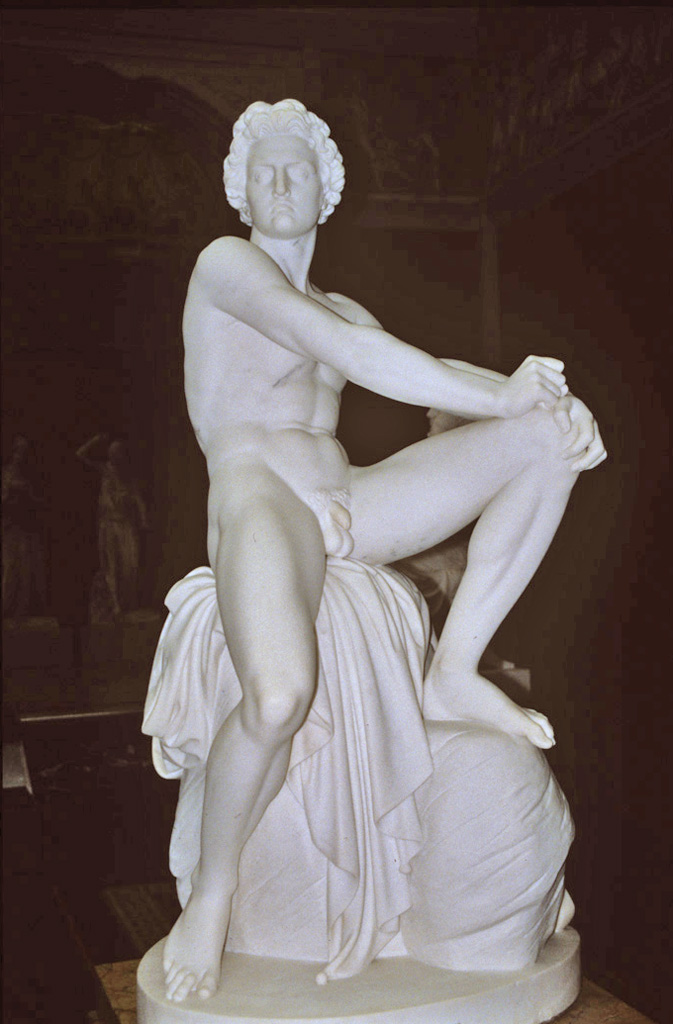
The Wrathful Achilles (1864-66)

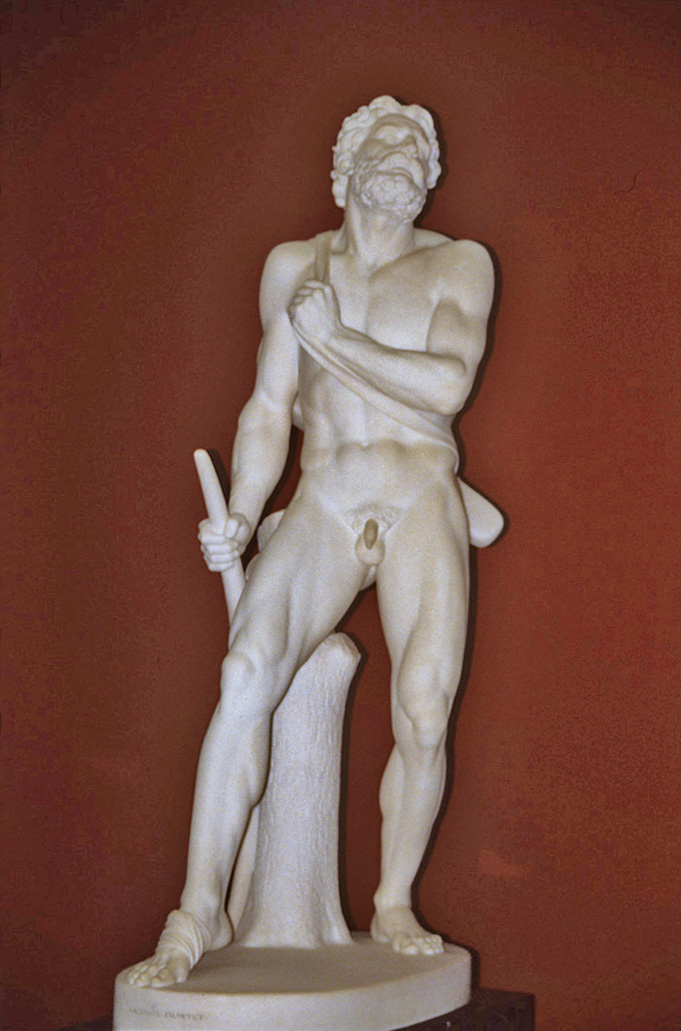
The Wounded Philoctetes (1854-1855)

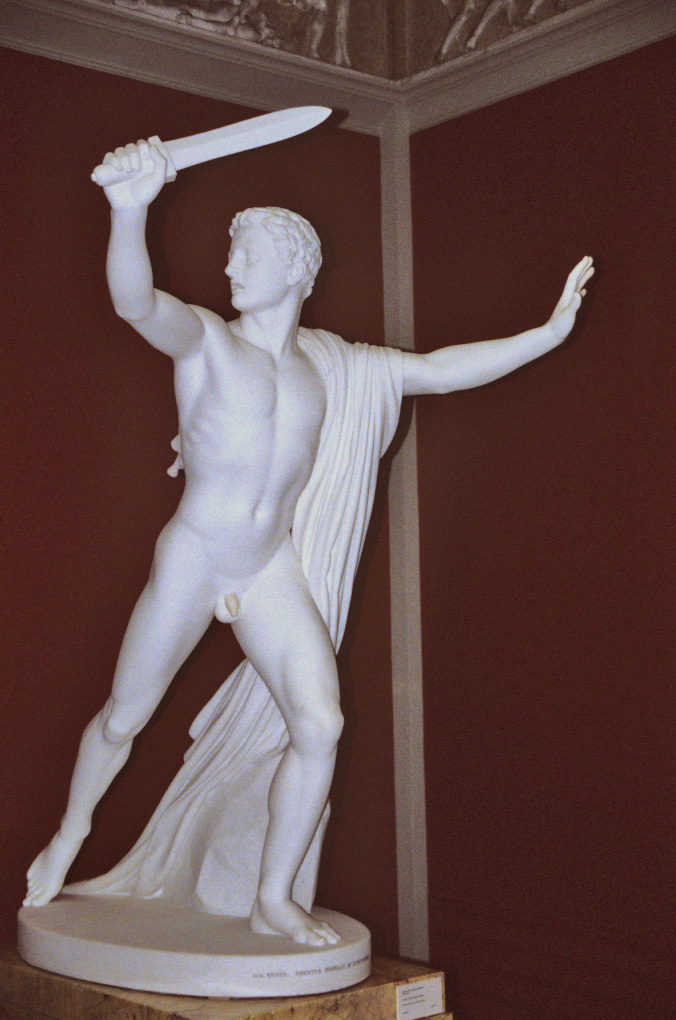
Orestes Fleeing from the Furies (1848)

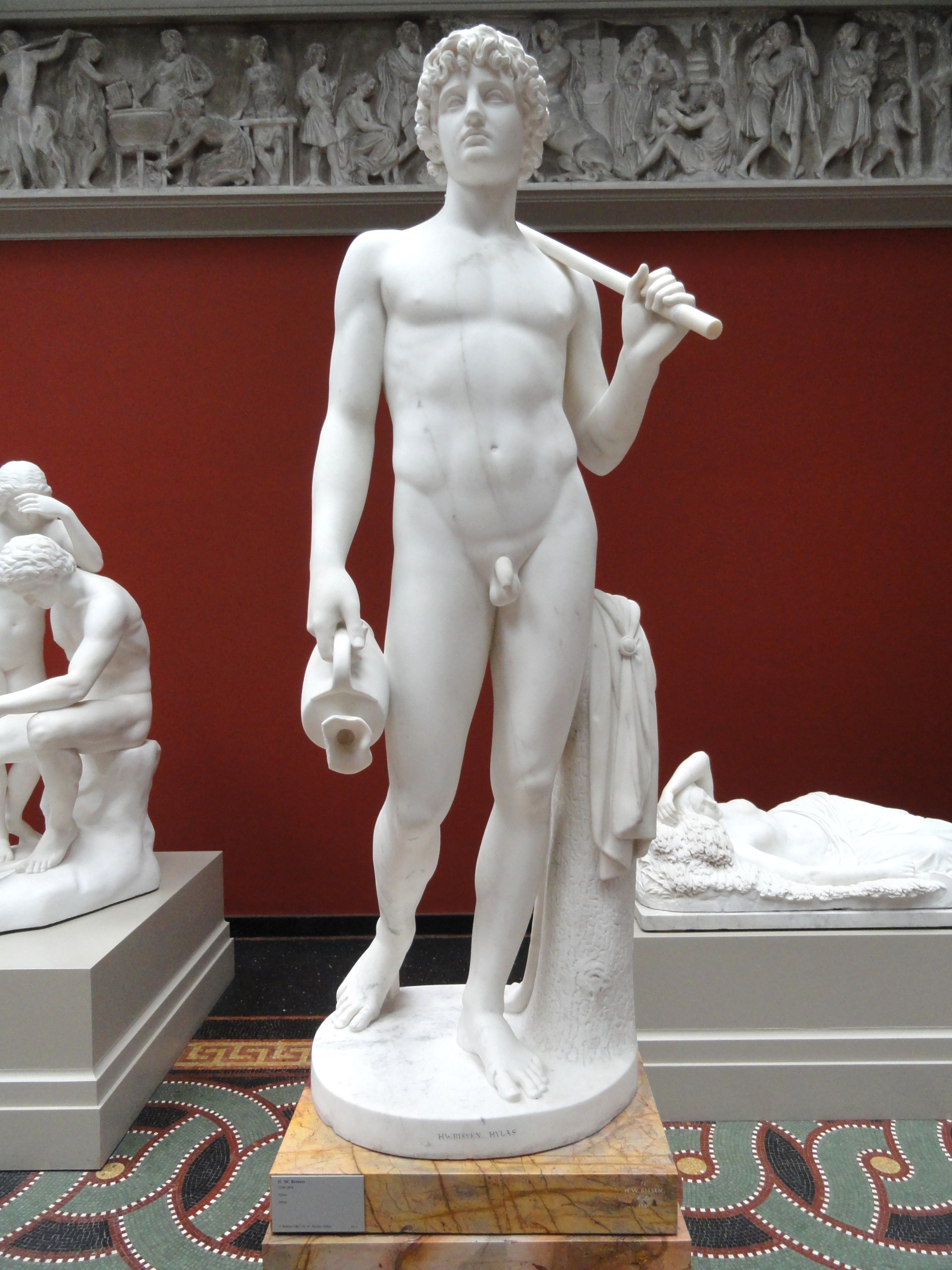
Hylas (1846)

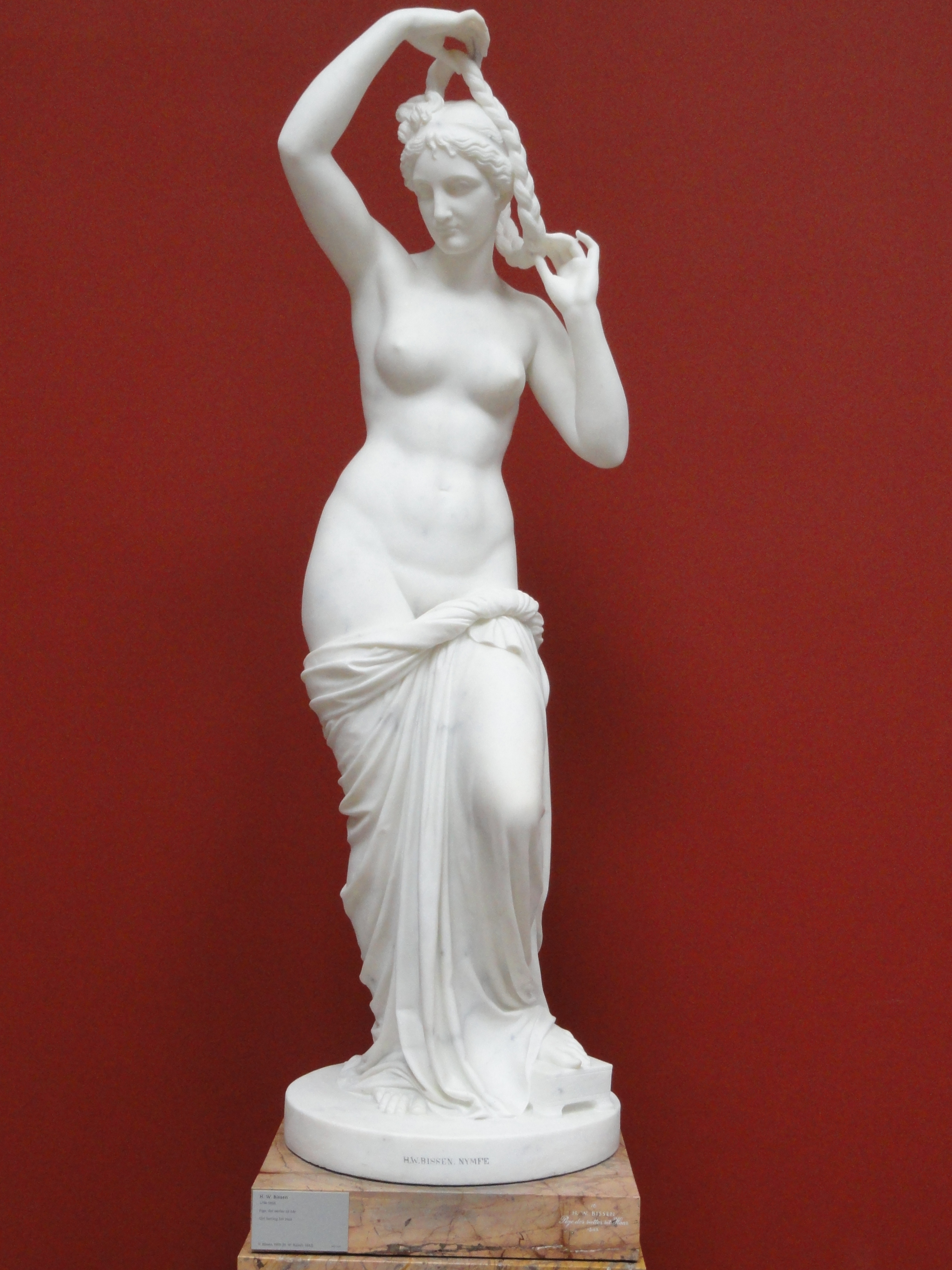
Girl Setting her Hair (1842)

Cultural offices
Preceded by Jørgen Hansen Koch	Director of the Royal Danish Academy of Fine Arts; 1850–1853	Succeeded by Wilhelm Marstrand
