= Royal Library Garden, Copenhagen =

Garden of the Danish Royal Library in Copenhagen

Coordinates: 55.6746°N 12.5813°E

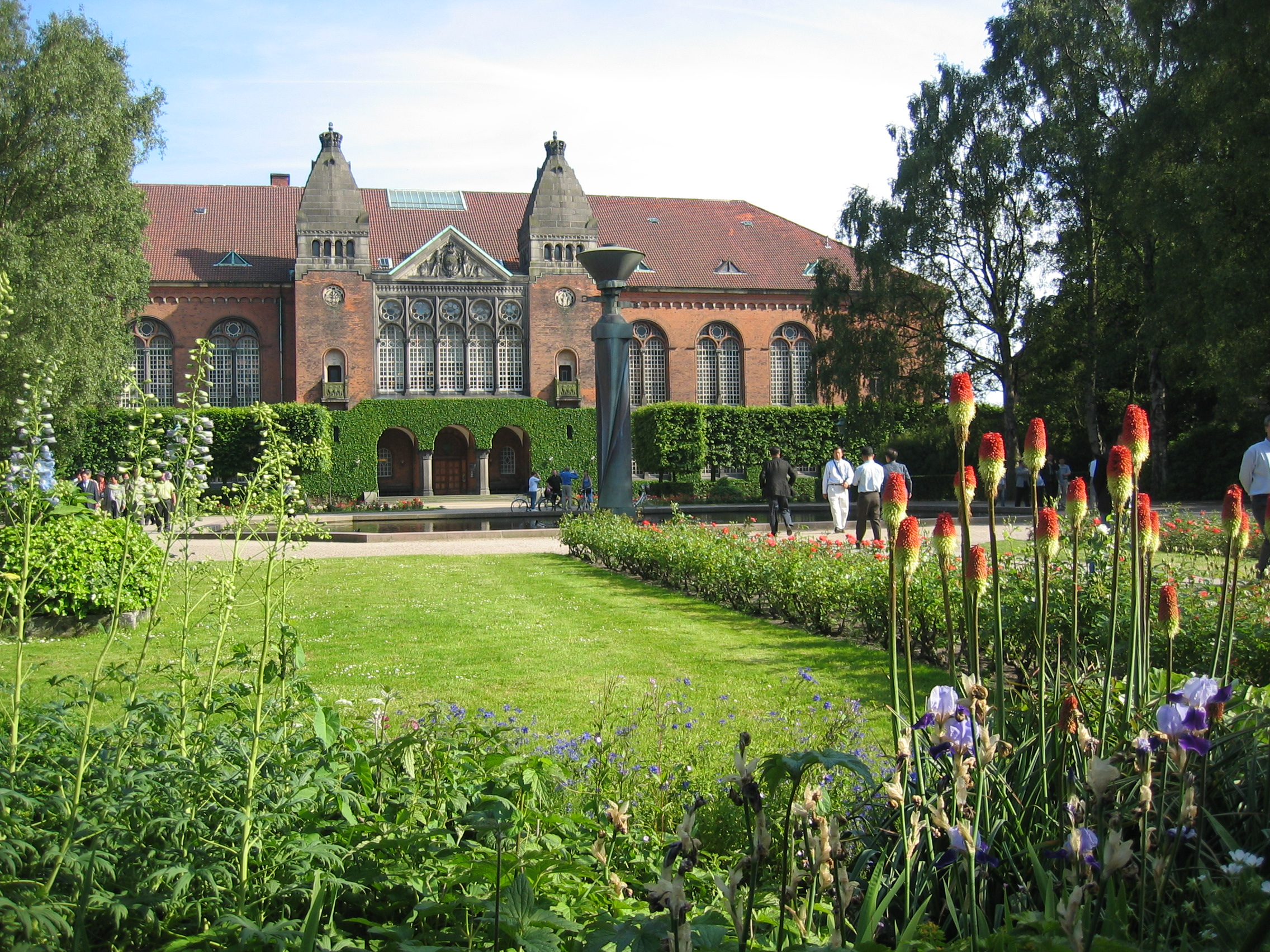
The Library Garden with the Royal Library as the backdrop

The Royal Library Garden (Danish: Det Kongelige Biblioteks Have), often referred to simply as the Library Garden, is a small, somewhat hidden garden between the Royal Library, the Tøjhus Museum, ChristianIV's Supply Depot and Christiansborg Palace on Slotsholmen in central Copenhagen, Denmark. It has a reputation for being one of the most tranquil spots in the city centre.

The garden has a shallow water basin with a water feature in the middle, blooming flower beds and large shady trees. It is accessible from the courtyard at Christiansborg's show grounds.

== History ==
The Library Garden is located on top of the former site of Christian IVs old Naval Harbour. The harbour was flanked by an arsenal—now housing the Tøjhus Museum—and a supply depot, both completed in 1694, and was connected to the main harbour by a narrow canal. Later the Navy was moved to Holmens Kanal and the old harbour was filled in 1867. The garden was designed in 1920 by landscape gardener Jens Peder Andersen and Christiansborg's architect Thorvald Jørgensen. As a reminder of its maritime past, a small pond has been retained in the middle of the gardens and an old mooring ring of the type used by ships in the 17th and 18th centuries has been built into the masonry at the end of the gardens.

== Features ==
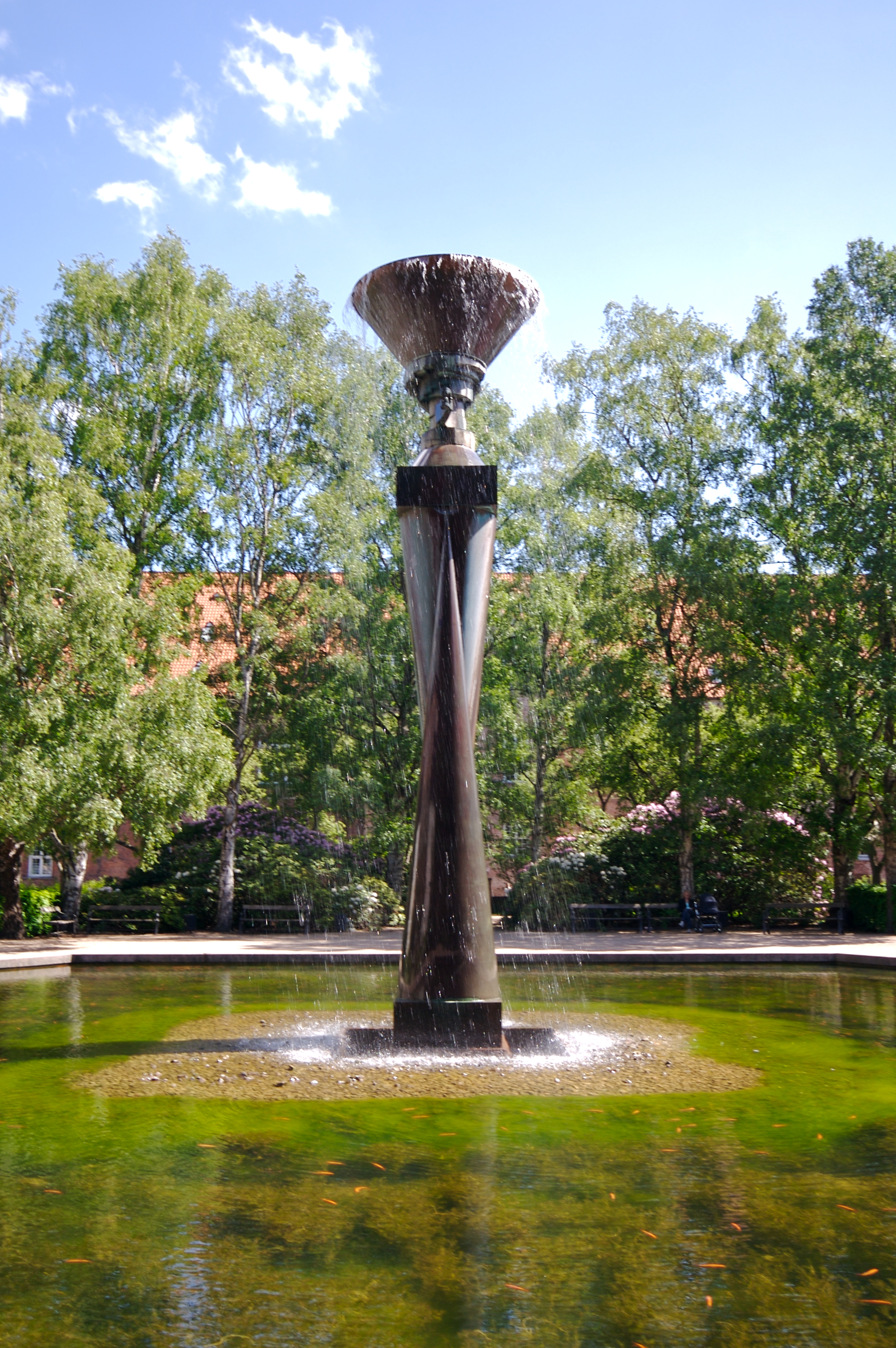
The water feature

=== Basin and water sculpture ===
The garden has a shallow pool at its centre. In the middle of it stands an eight-metre-high copper sculpture which spouts out cascades of water on the hour. Designed by scultpror Mogens Møller, it was a gift from the Ny Carlsberg Foundation to the Royal Library on the occasion of the opening of its extension, the Black Diamond, located on the waterfront on the other side of the old library building.

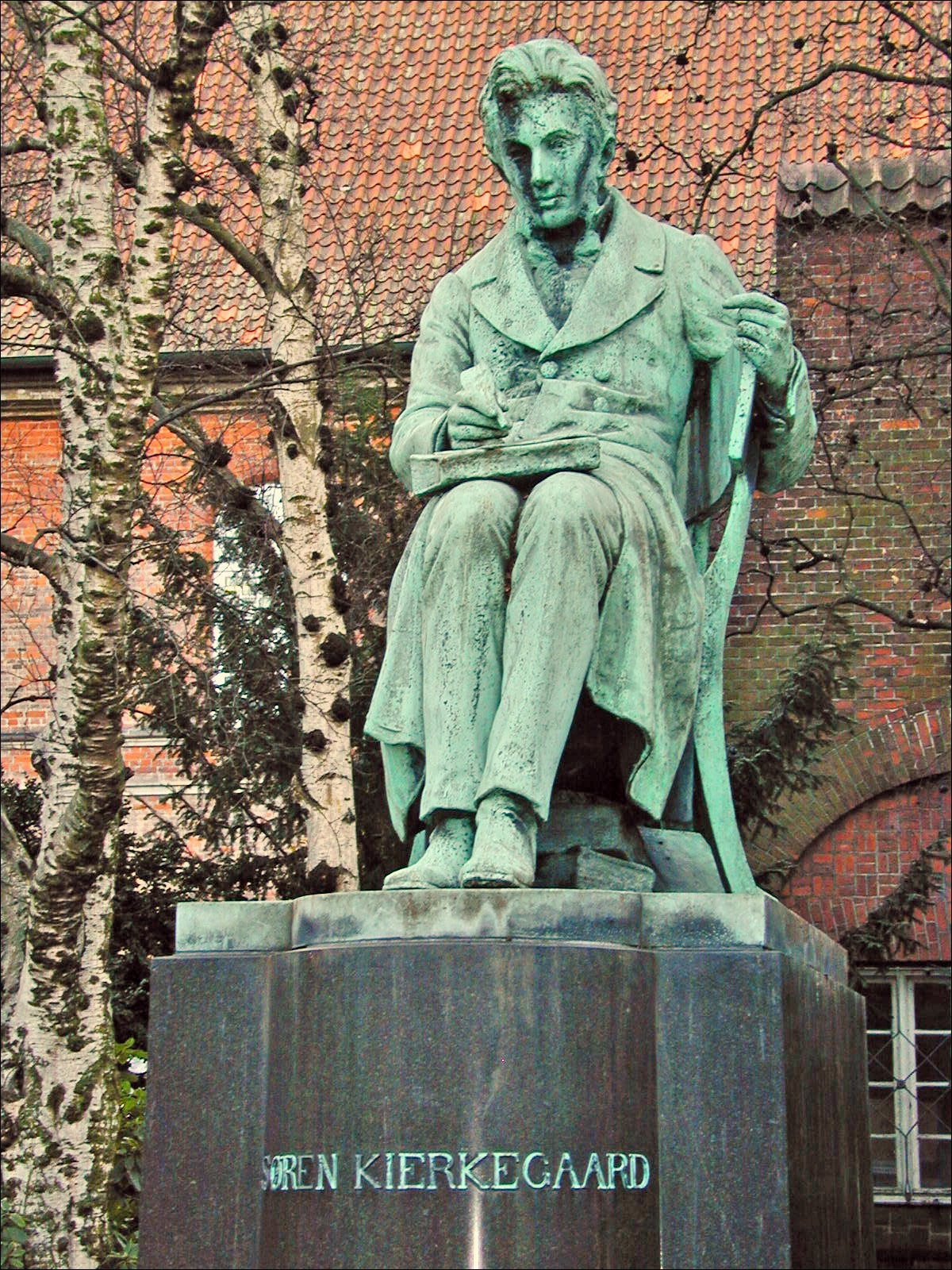
The Søren Kierkegaard statue

=== Kierkegaard sculpture ===
A 1918 bronze statue of Søren Kierkegaard by sculptor Louis Hasselriis is located in the middle of the gardens. Kierkegaard appears absorbed in his own thoughts with his gaze directed towards a point on the other side of the wall where his fiancée, Regine Olsen, is said to have lived.

==== Vegetation ====
The wide variety of flowers in the gardens change with the seasons. Visitors can enjoy the view from rows of benches in the shade of the trees or from others out in the sun along the wall between the gardens and the yard to the Danish National Archives. Column plinths from the old Christiansborg serve as epergnes in the four grassy corner pieces and the principal axis through the gardens creates a link between the yard to the Danish National Archives and the main entrance to the Royal Library.

== Gallery ==
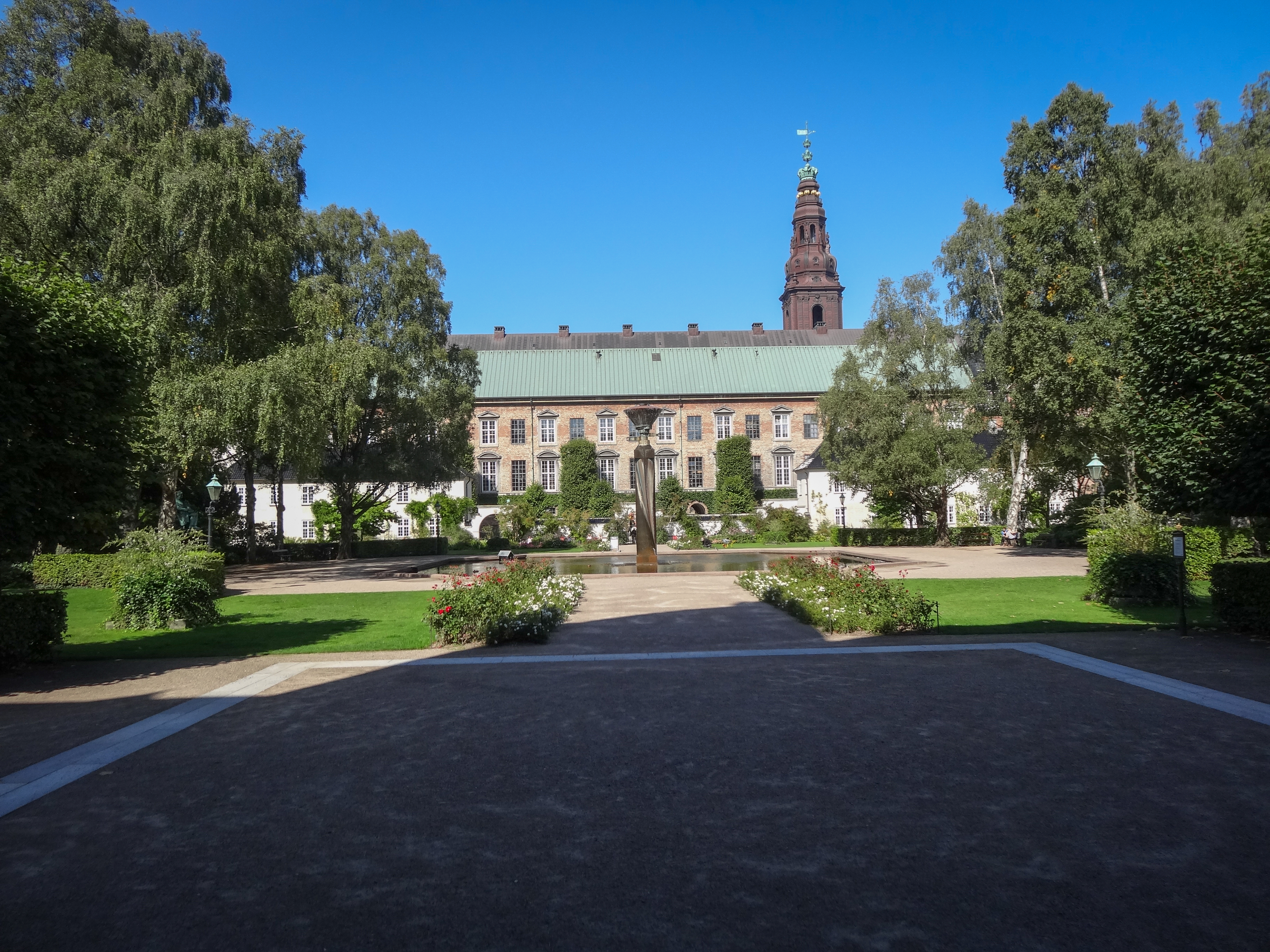
View towards Christiansborg

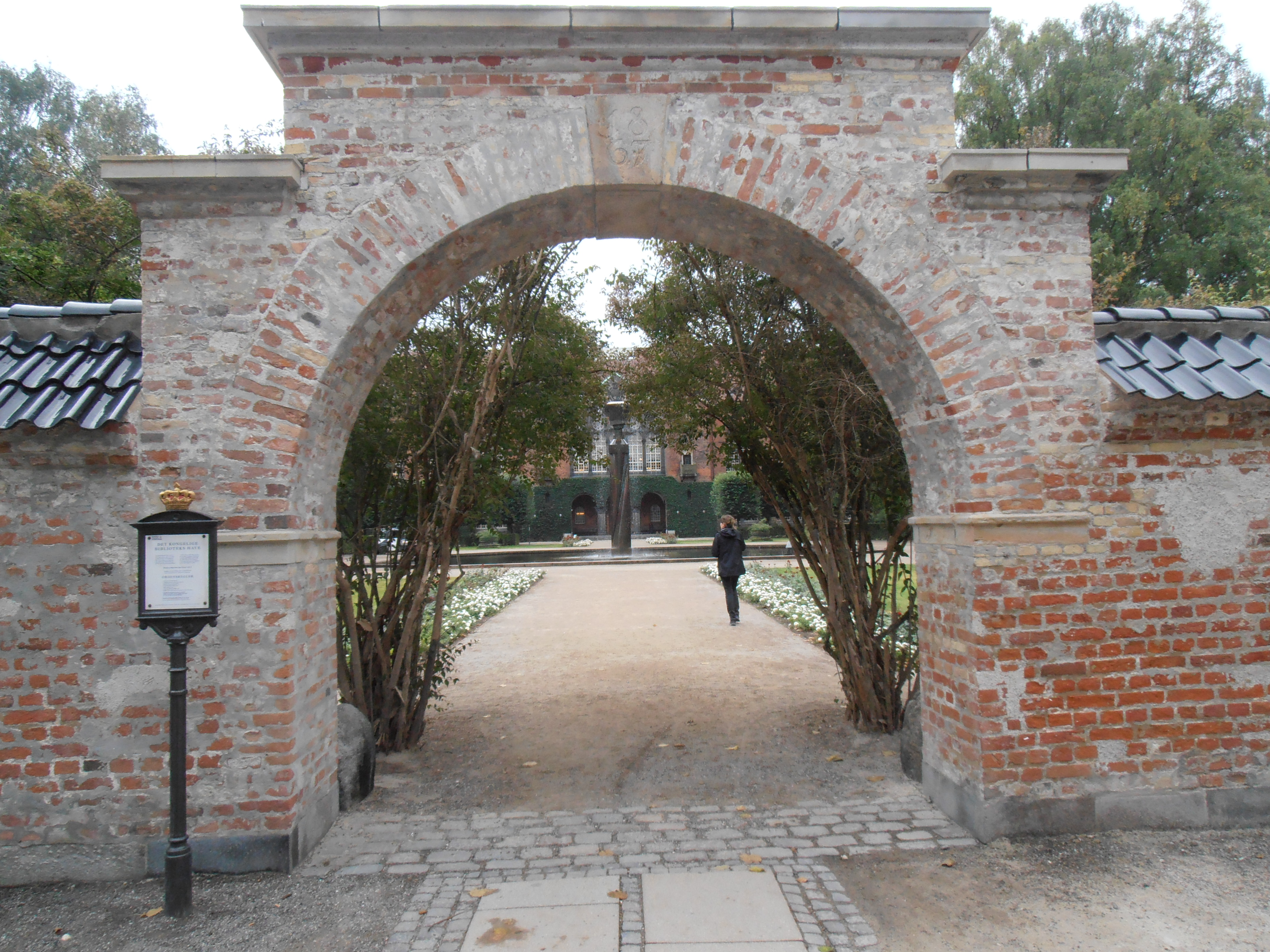
The arched entrance

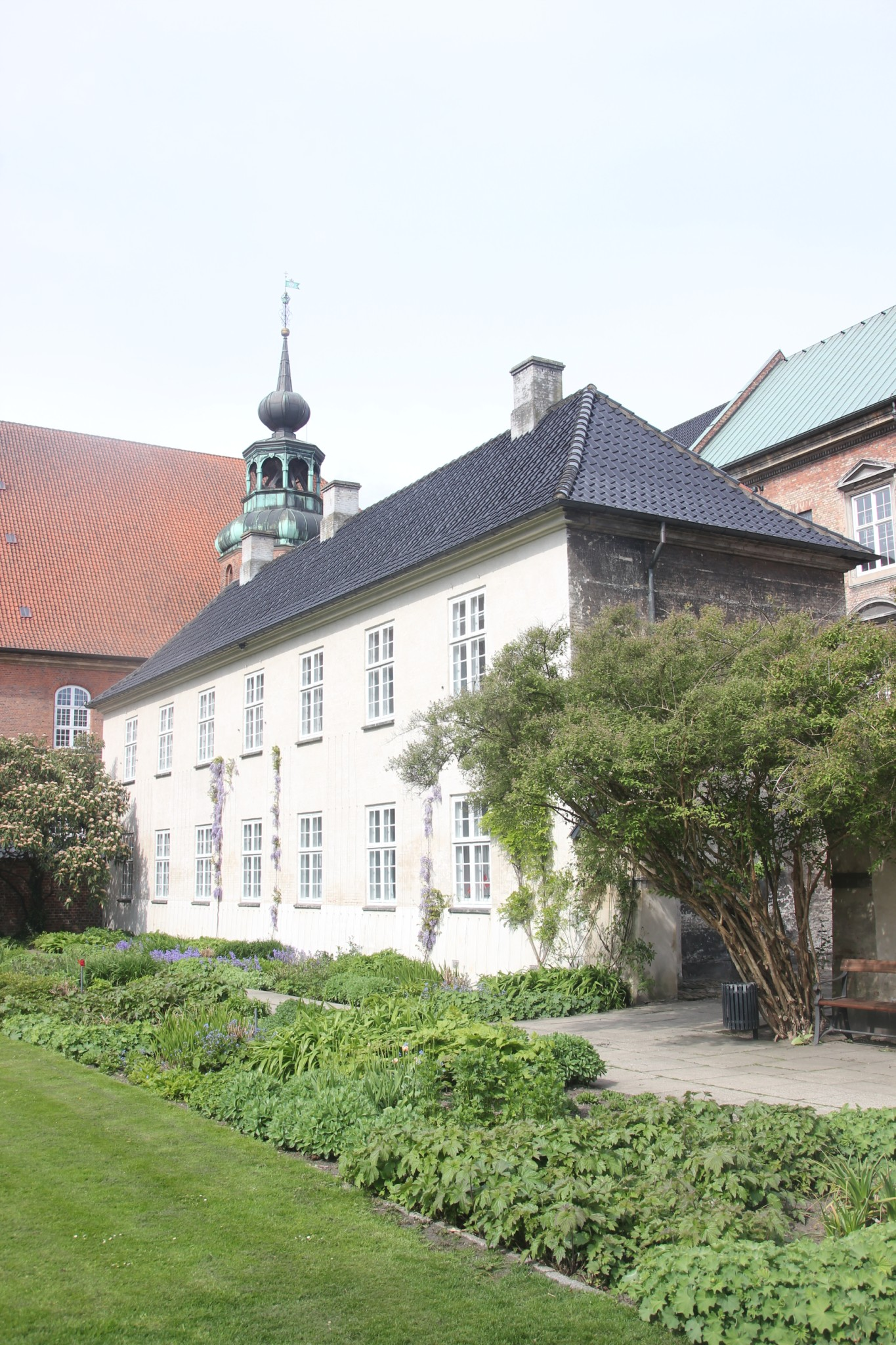
One of two identical and symmetrically placed pavilions

== See also ==
- Parks and open spaces in Copenhagen
