= Gerhard Christoph von Krogh =

Danish noble and general (1785–1860)

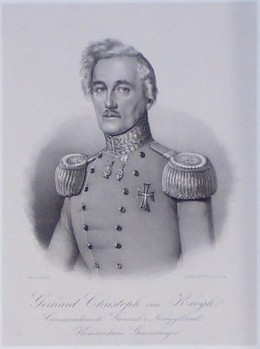
Gerhard Christoph von Krogh

Gerhard Christoph von Krogh (10 October 1785 – 12 April 1860) was a Danish nobleman and military officer. He served as a General and was the Danish Supreme Commander during the First Schleswig War. His victory at the Battle of Isted, was at its time the largest in Scandinavian history. The battle's anniversary on the 25th of July, is the military flag day in Denmark.

He was the son of Privy Councillor, Friderich Ferdinand von Krogh and Rosine Elisabeth von Frankenburg und Proschlitz. He married Komtesse Siegfriede Victorine Knuth-Christiansdal on 6 February 1813 at the Citadels Church in Copenhagen. Together they had a residence in the Prince's Mansion in Copenhagen from 1817 until 1853.

== Legacy ==
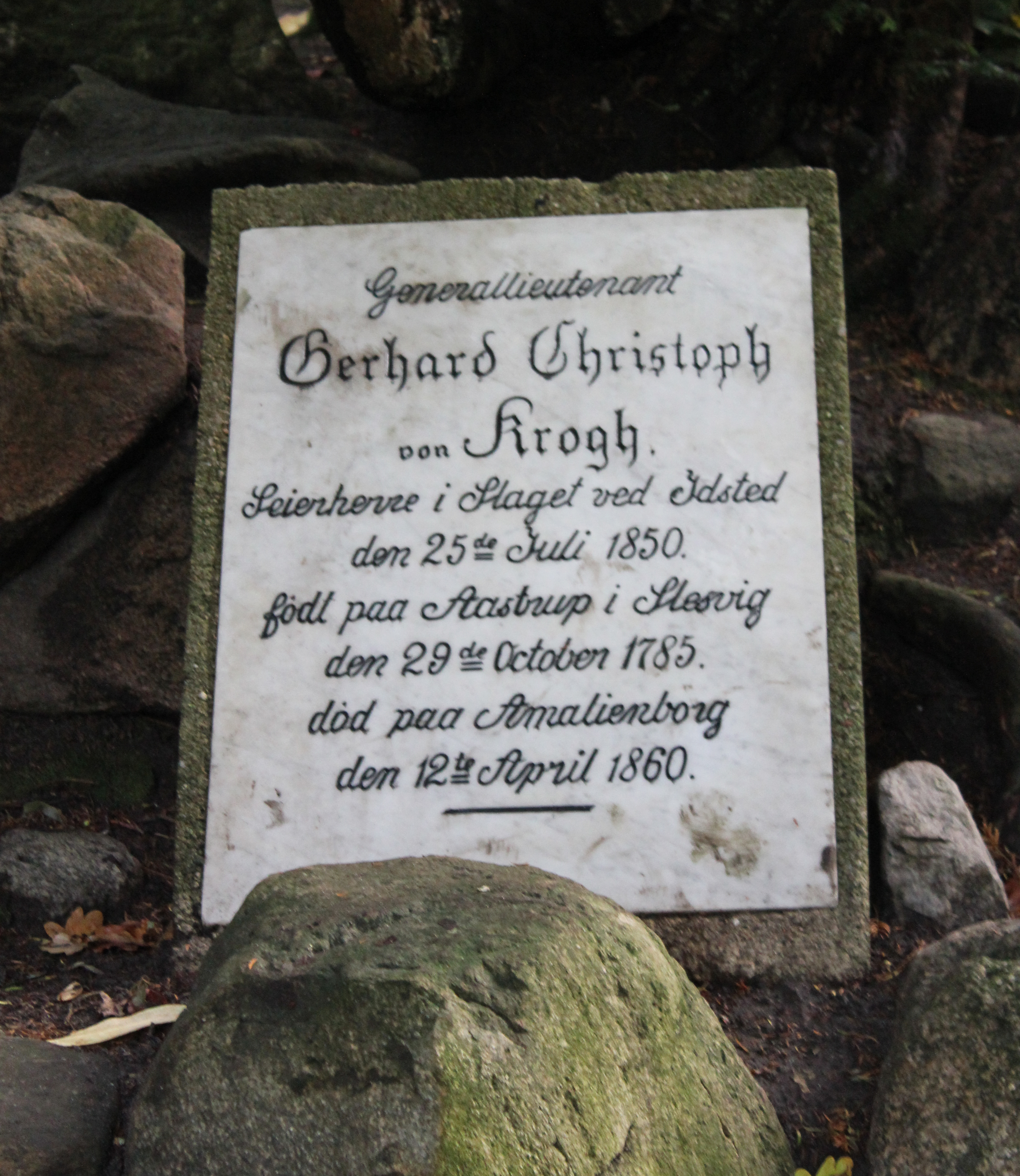
His gravestone in Flensburg, opposite the Flensburg Lion.

The memorial Isted Lion is partly dedicated to von Krogh. Kroghsgade in Århus is named after him.
