= Elisabeth Toubro =

Danish artist (born 1956)

Elisabeth Toubro (born 8 December 1956) is a Danish artist who has been a major contributor to the renewal of sculpture in Denmark.

== Biography ==
Born in Nuuk, Greenland, Toubro was the daughter of educators Niels Toubro and Kaja Gylding. She moved to Denmark when she was 17 and studied at the Royal Danish Academy of Fine Arts under Hein Heinsen from 1982 to 1986. There she associated with Henrik B. Andersen, Morten Stræde, Elle Klarskov Jørgensen and Øivind Nygård who were also influenced by Heinsen's theoretical approach to sculpture.

In the 1980s, she was a central figure in the group of artists who undertook a significant renewal of Danish sculpture with an emphasis on narrative, often addressing Greenland, breaking tradition in their use of materials. Her exhibition Inertia min elskede (Inertia My Love) in 1983 with Stræde and Nygård was significant in that it presented aspects of minimalism while it showed how sculpture could penetrate structures to reveal messages from several periods with references to the space of tradition. Other notable exhibits were presented at Skulpturens tid (Sculpture's Time) at Sophienholm in 1987 and Juxtaposition at Charlottenborg in 1993. She has also presented solo exhibitions in New York City (1994) and Indianapolis (1998). Key aspects of her work include metamorphosis, transformation and narrative as depicted in her Søjlekonstruktion (Pillar Construction) in 1995 when the form of her pillar gave rise to a kind of mutating pillar growth. The materials she has used include fiberglass, polystyrene, vinyl, metal and polyvinyl chloride.

During the 1990s, she began to address the role of public sculpture in the modern world, including the impression left when a work is viewed from the window of a passing car. A notable example is Byfraktal (City Fractal), a large stainless-steel and glass-fibre sculpture on Søren Kierkegaards Plads outside the newly completed Black Diamond in 2000.

== Awards ==
Toubro received the Eckersberg Medal in 1999 and the Thorvaldsen Medal in 2010.
