= Isted Lion =

Danish war monument unveiled in 1862

Coordinates: 54°47′6.936″N 9°25′47.06″E

- Istedløven
- Danish Palace and Properties Agency; Danish: Slots- og Ejendomsstyrelsen
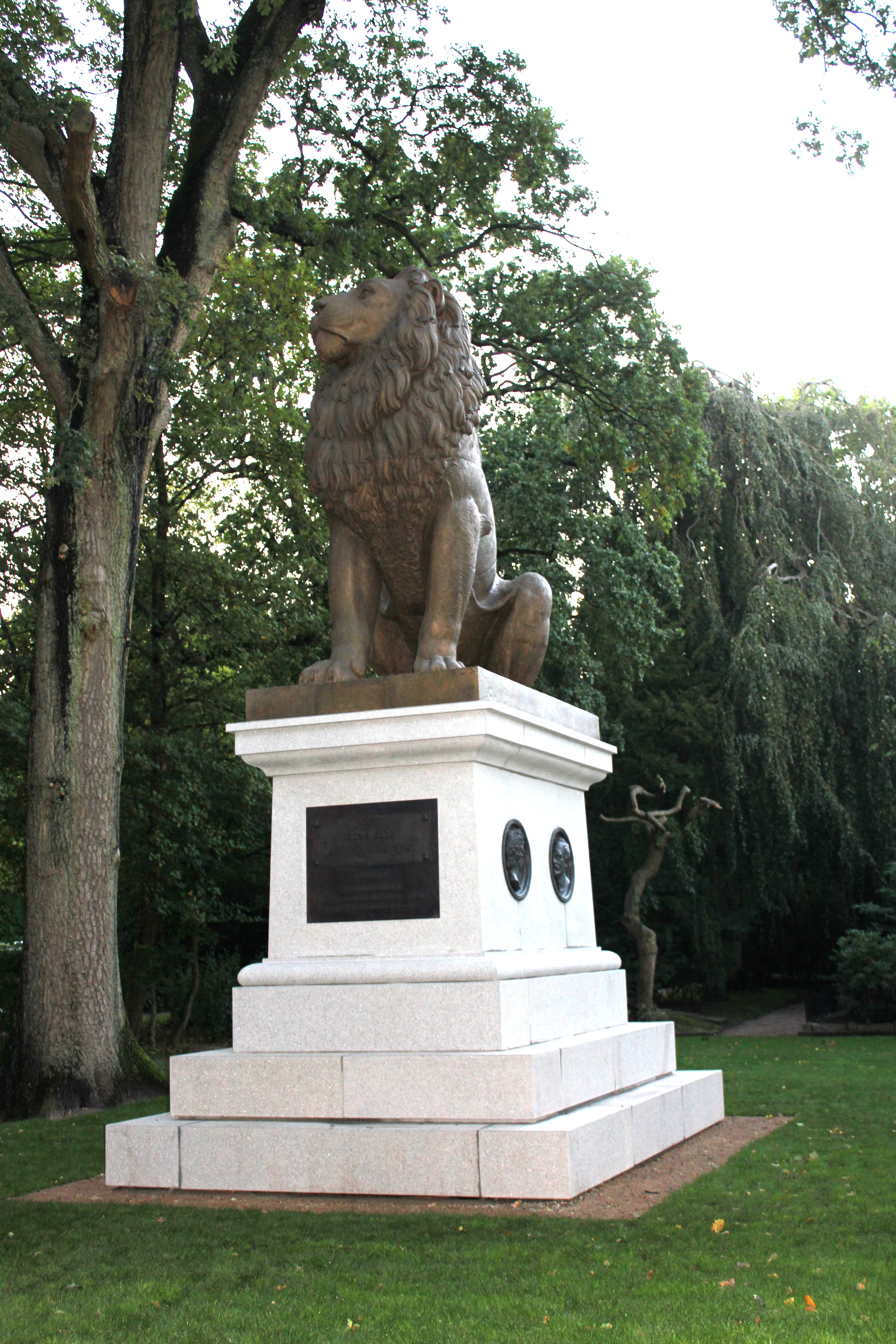
- For victory in the Battle of Isted
- Unveiled: 25 July 1862 in Flensburg
- Location: The Old Cemetery Flensburg, Germany
- Designed by: Herman Wilhelm Bissen
- ISTED; DEN 25. JULI 1850 REJST 1862 2011 wieder errichtet als Zeichen von Freundschaft und Vertrauen zwischen Dänen und Deutschen

The Isted Lion (or Flensburg Lion) (Danish: Istedløven or Flensborgløven; German: Flensburger Löwe or Idstedter Löwe) is a Danish war monument originally intended as a monument of the Danish victory over German-minded Schleswig-Holstein insurgents in the Battle of Isted (Idstedt) on 25 July 1850, during the First Schleswig War which was a civil war within the Danish Realm, although with troops from Prussia supporting the Schleswig-Holstein insurgents. At its time it was the largest battle in Scandinavian history.

Others perceived it more as a memorial for the Danish dead in the battle.

Originally erected in Flensburg, Schleswig during Danish rule, it was moved to Berlin by Prussian authorities after Prussian conquests in the Second Schleswig War of 1864 and remained there until 1945. It was returned to Denmark as a gift from the United States Army and was located at Søren Kierkegaards Plads in Copenhagen. In September 2011, it was returned to Flensburg.

== History ==
=== Flensburg ===
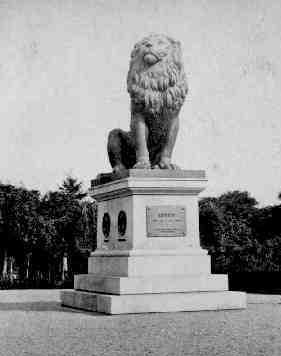
The Isted Lion in Flensburg c. 1864

Following the Danish victory over Schleswig-Holstein in the First War of Schleswig (1848–51), Danish sculptor Herman Wilhelm Bissen was commissioned to create a monument to the ordinary Danish soldier. Although not an actual Tomb of the Unknown Soldier, his monument reflected a similar idea. This monument Landsoldaten (the Foot Soldier) was unveiled in Fredericia in 1858. At the following banquet, it was decided to start a public subscription of funds for a second monument, and one of the options discussed was a statue of General Frederik Rubeck Henrik Bülow, the commander of Fredericia during the German siege of the town. Through the intervention of politician Orla Lehmann, it was decided that the funds would instead be used for a monument commemorating the Battle of Isted. Like the previous monument, this commission was awarded to Bissen.

The lion is derived from the arms of Denmark and Schleswig which contain three and two blue lions, respectively. In order to create a perfect image of a lion, Bissen travelled to Paris to study a lion held in the Jardin des Plantes and created a life-size model before returning to Denmark. Bissen completed his first plaster model in 1860, and the bronze cast was completed by June 1862. The statue's plinth of Bornholm stone was decorated with four round metal reliefs depicting four Danish officers from the war; Generals Gerhard Christoph von Krogh and Friderich Adolph Schleppegrell and Colonels Hans Helgesen and Frederik Læssøe. The finished monument was approximately four meters tall, and carried the following inscription:

Isted den 25. Juli 1850. Det danske Folk reiste dette Minde
(Isted, 25 July 1850. The Danish people set this memorial)

The statue was unveiled on the 12th anniversary of the battle, 25 July 1862, at St Mary's Cemetery in Flensburg, Schleswig's largest city. Among the celebrities attending the ceremony was fairy-tale writer Hans Christian Andersen.

Erecting the monument in Flensburg rather than Copenhagen or Isted, was seen as a provocation by the region's German nationalists who opposed the Danish claim to sovereignty over the area. The decision to let the lion face south reinforced this feeling. Flensburg was divided by national sympathies but had a pro-Danish majority until after the 1864 war.

=== Berlin ===
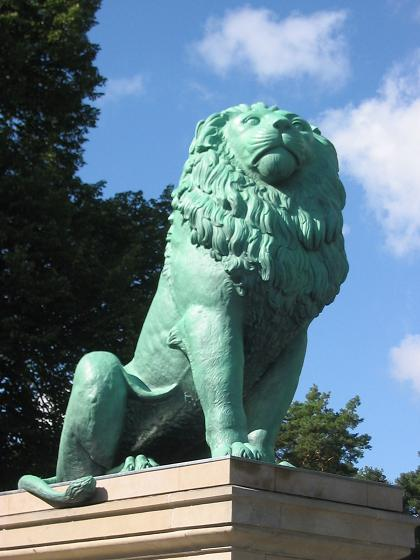
The zinc copy in Berlin. Picture taken following its restoration in 2005.

In 1864, war returned to the region, culminating in the German victory in the Battle of Dybbøl. In the following peace settlement, Denmark surrendered both Schleswig and Holstein, leaving the monument on the German side of the new border.

Following the occupation of Flensburg by German forces, German nationalists attacked the monument and tried to topple it. They succeeded in removing the tail and part of the lion's back but failed to destroy the statue due to the intervention of German authorities.

The Prime Minister of Prussia, Otto von Bismarck, ordered the monument to be dismantled, and its parts were originally stored in the courtyard of the Schleswig Estates in Flensburg. In 1867, the lion and the four reliefs were moved to Berlin at the order of Generalfeldmarschall Friedrich Graf von Wrangel.

The reassembled lion was erected in the Zeughaus (Arsenal) in Berlin on February 9, 1868. Following the transformation of the arsenal into a military museum in 1875, the lion was transported to the Cadet Academy in Lichterfelde, and erected there in April 1878. The lion remained there for more than 60 years.

In 1874, a zinc copy of the monument was erected in Berlin in a public park, Schweiz, near the Colonie Alsen association of war veterans. This monument was paid for by banker Wilhelm Conrad. A path leading up to the statue was fittingly dubbed, Straße zum Löwen, i.e. the Road to the Lion. On the copy, the reliefs of the four Danish officers were replaced with a single image of the German officer Prince Frederick Charles of Prussia, in effect reversing the meaning of the original monument. In 1938, the Danish press reported the existence of the copy of the historic monument, and at roughly the same time, the zinc copy was moved to Heckeshorn near the Wannsee, where it remains today. This location is close to the building housing what would later be known as the Wannsee Conference. The statue in Berlin was repaired in 2005.

=== Copenhagen ===
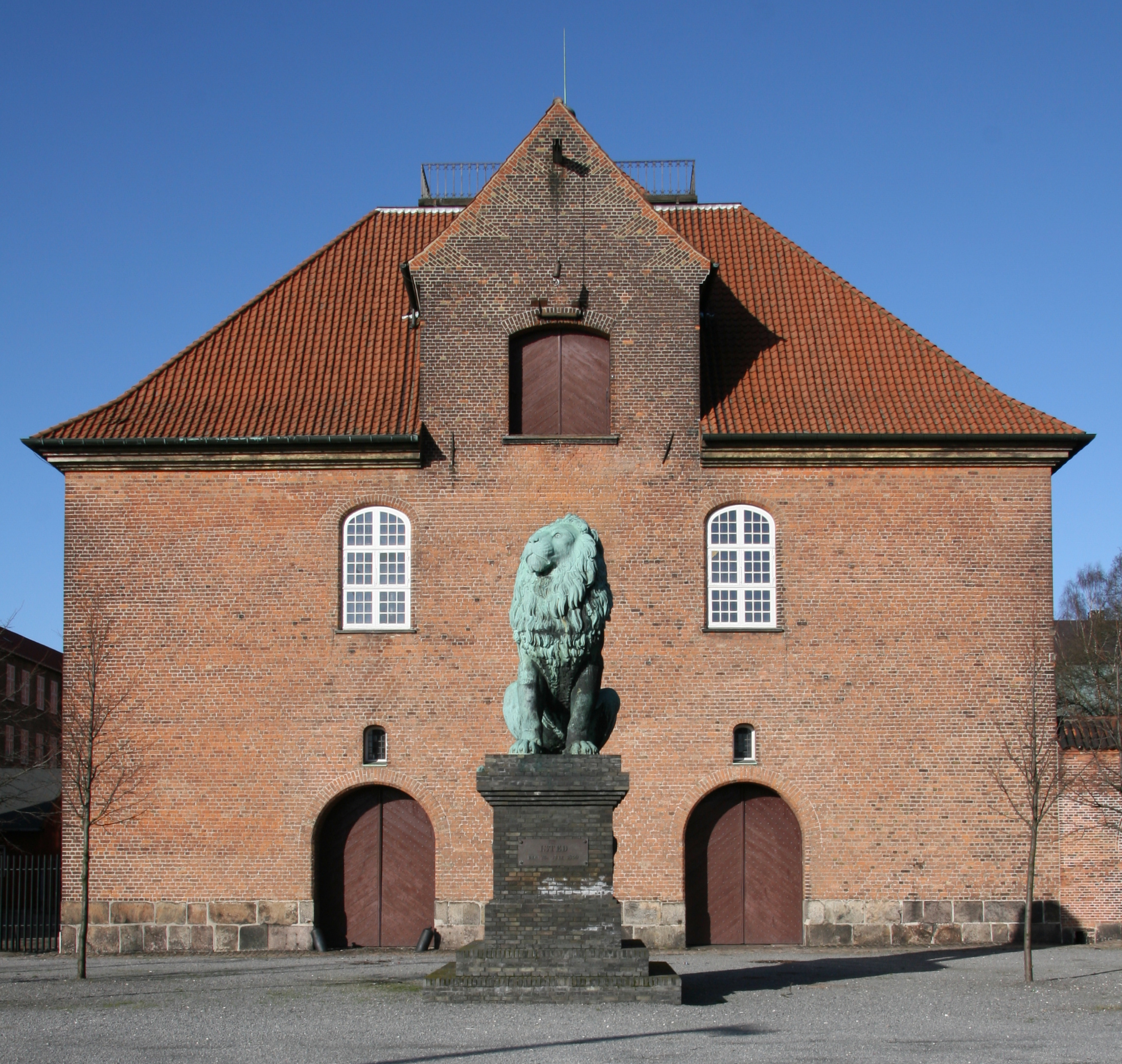
The original Isted Lion in front of the Royal Danish Arsenal Museum, Søren Kierkegaards Plads, Copenhagen. The plinth was created in 2000.

Following the defeat of Nazi Germany in World War II, Henrik V. Ringsted, a correspondent from the Danish newspaper Politiken, "rediscovered" the monument in Berlin and approached the United States Army about a possible return of the statue. The issue ultimately reached the desk of General Dwight D. Eisenhower, the Supreme Commander of the Allied forces in Europe, who demanded an official request in order to allow the return of the monument. Such a request was promptly delivered by Danish Foreign Minister John Christmas Møller. Møller said, "The removal of this sepulchral monument, which in this country is considered a national sanctuary, and its erection in a German military academy, caused a resentment which till this very day is still alive in wide circles of the Danish people."

In the autumn of 1945, the paperwork had been completed, and an American army convoy headed for Copenhagen, where it arrived on October 5. On October 20, the lion was officially handed over to King Christian X. In what was considered an interim solution, the lion was placed in a courtyard on the rear side of the Royal Danish Arsenal Museum (Tøjhusmuseet) and placed on a mere wooden plinth.

From 1945 to 1947, a few Danish politicians, with wide support in the popular opinion, advocated for a re-annexation of Southern Schleswig, and in particular Flensburg – resulting in a fierce political debate. As the debate ended with a confirmation of the existing border, the same politicians ruled out the possibility of returning the statue to a German-ruled town. On a number of occasions, controversy over the monument resurfaced, as a new generation of politicians began advocating for its return to a German-administered Flensburg.

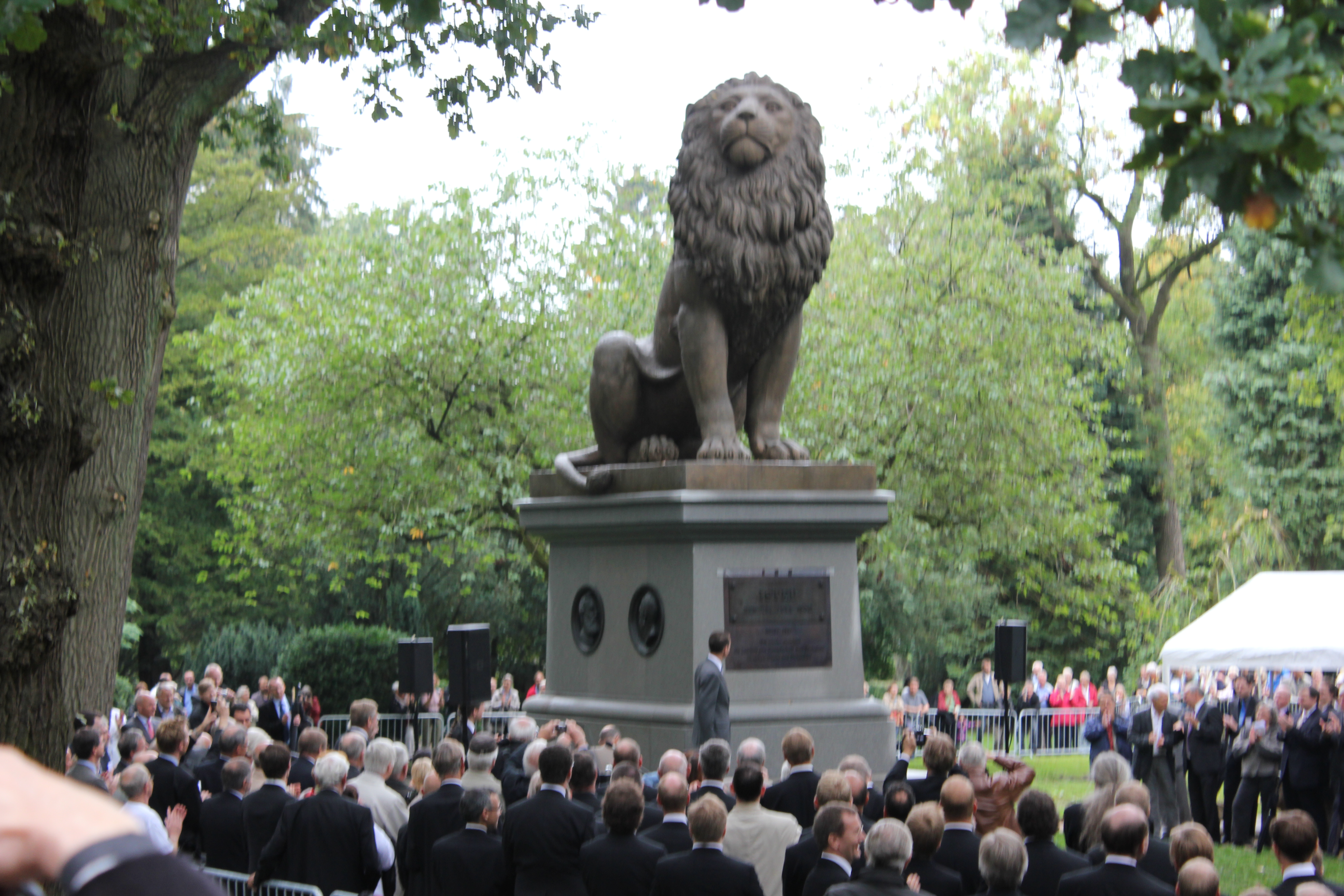
Prince Joachim of Denmark is looking to the memorial plaque which he had revealed, seconds before.

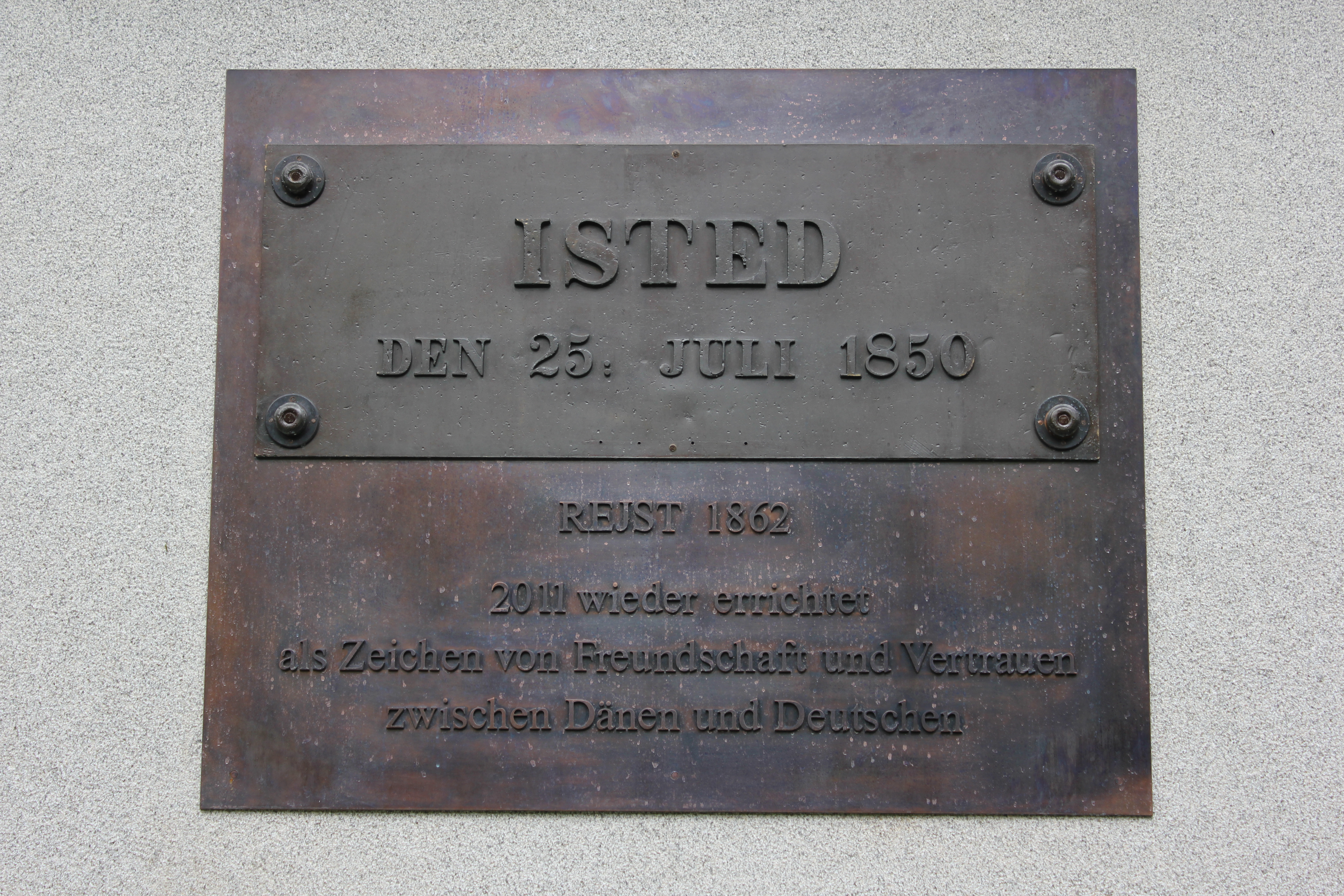
The new plaque on the front side. Translation of text: Isted 25 June 1850 / erected 1862 / 2011 erected again as a sign of friendship and trust between Danes and Germans

In 1999, construction of a new public square near the museum began, prompted by a relocation of the Danish Royal Library to a neighbouring site. The debate about moving the lion to this more prominent position began, and the Ny-Carlsberg Foundation volunteered to pay for the relocation. The wooden plinth was replaced with a bigger one made of brick, and the statue was reunited with its four reliefs for the first time in more than a century. The finished result was unveiled on the 150th anniversary of the battle, July 25, 2000, by Danish Minister for Culture Elsebeth Gerner Nielsen. In her speech, she expressed the wish that the statue would be returned to Flensburg. In a Parliament debate on November 20, 1998, she had previously stated that the statue should be returned to Flensburg, since that was the wish of the Danish minority there.

A committee in Fredericia, already the home of Bissen's other main work, the statue of the Foot Soldier, was lobbying for moving the monument there.

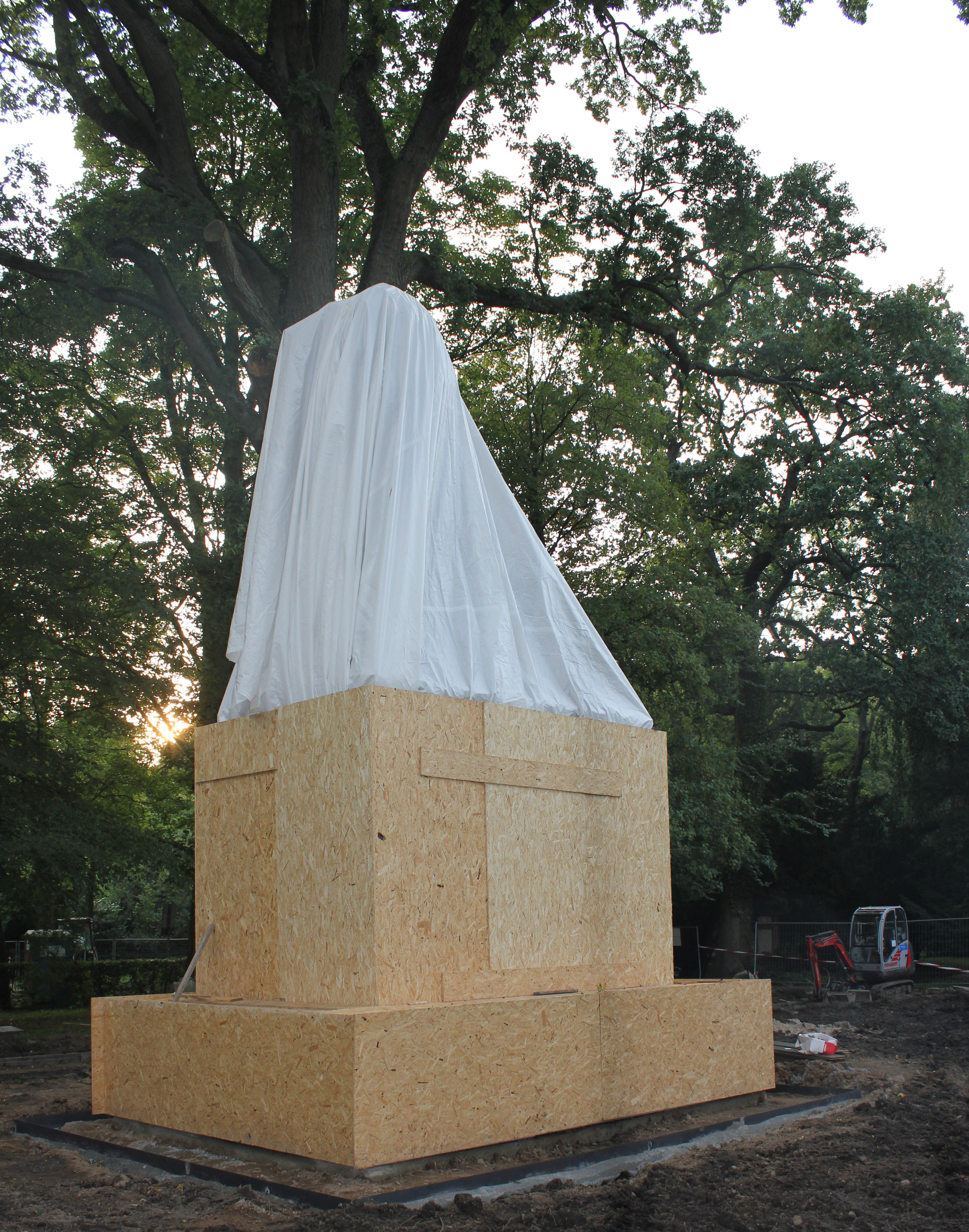
The wrapped Lion in Flensburg

=== Return to Flensburg ===
At the request of the city council of Flensburg, the Danish Government decided to return the Isted Lion to its original home in Flensburg. On 10 September 2011, it returned to the military cemetery, where it was first erected. The ceremony was attended by HRH Prince Joachim of Denmark.
