= Søren Kierkegaards Plads =

Public square in Copenhagen

Coordinates: 55.6729°N 12.5810°E

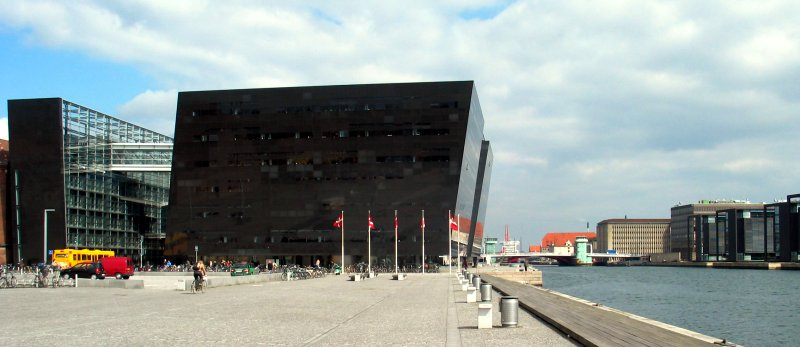
Søren Kierkegaards Plads with the Black Diamond leaning towards the water

Søren Kierkegaards Plads is a harbourside public square on Slotsholmen in central Copenhagen, Denmark, named after Danish philosopher Søren Kierkegaard. It occupies a strip of waterfront between the Black Diamond, whose main entrance faces the square, and the Frederiksholm Canal. Away from the water, the square is faced by Christian IV's Brewhouse as well as his old arsenal, now housing the Royal Military Museum. The thoroughfare Christians Brygge runs through the square which is connected to the water by "ghats" which also serve as seating for spectators for the occasional performances on a floating stage in the harbour basin.

== History ==
It was laid out in 1999 in connection with the construction of the adjacent Black Diamond.

== Artwork ==
- Outside the Black Diamond is a fountain with a sculpture made by Mogens Møller and called the Monument of the Book. It was donated to the library in 1993 on the occasion of the library's 200 years anniversary as a public library.
- In front of the arsenal building stands the Isted Lion but in 2009 it was decided that it will be returned to its original location in Flensburg, Germany.
- In May 2009 a cast of Anne Marie Carl-Nielsen's sculpture of a mermaid from 1831 was erected in the square. The original is on display in the National Gallery.
- There is also a sculpture by Elisabeth Toubro on the square
