= Mogens Møller =

Danish Minimalist painter and sculptor (1934–2021)

Mogens Møller (28 November 1934 – 16 June 2021) was a Danish Minimalist sculptor and painter who has designed a number of large public works and created the portrait of Queen Margrethe on Danish coins.

== Biography ==
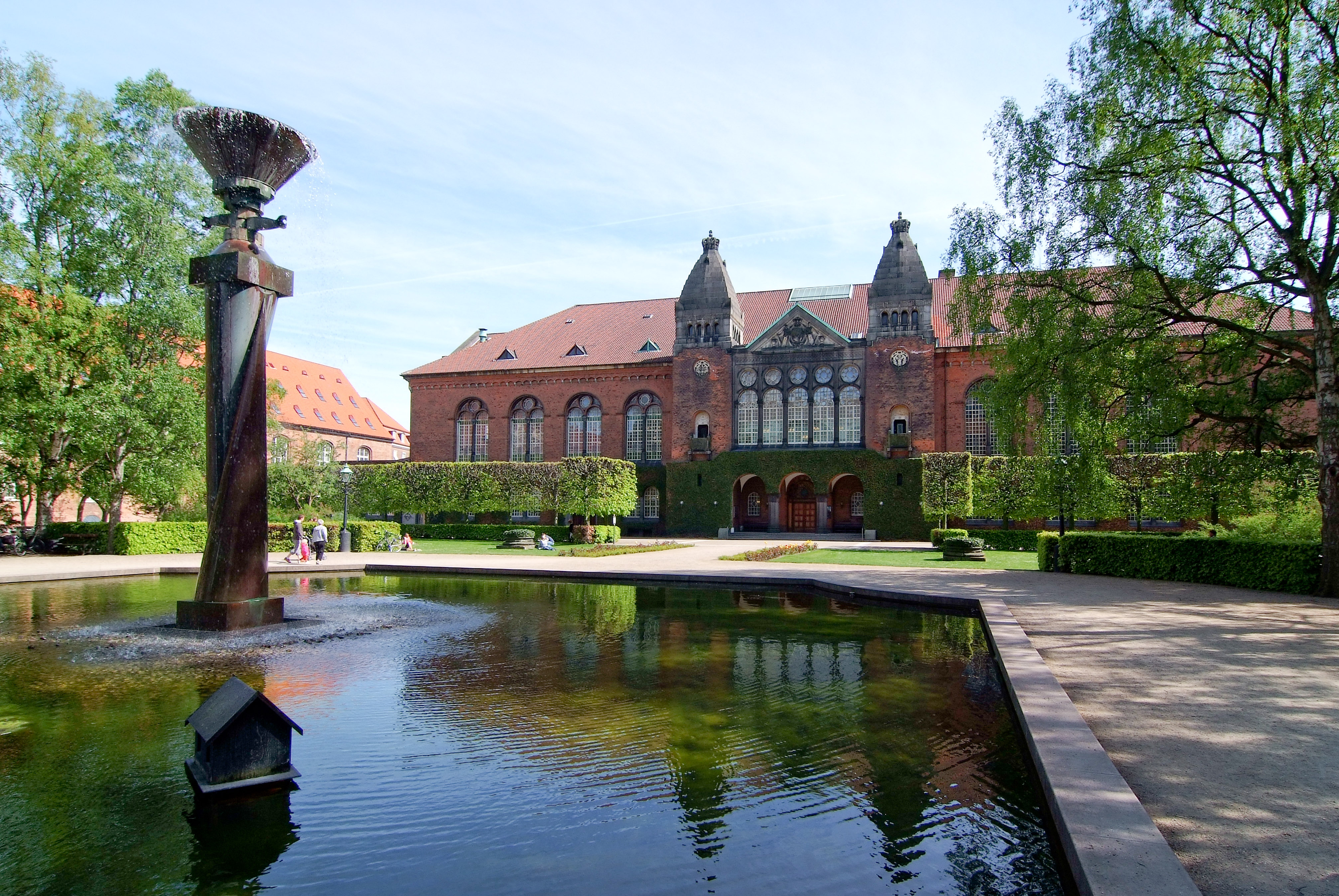
WIEDEWELT, 1731 Møller's Monument to the Book and the Written Word in the Royal Library Garden in Copenhagen

Born in Copenhagen, Møller studied at the Royal Danish Academy of Fine Arts under Gottfred Eickhoff and Richard Mortensen (1962–66). In the 1960s, together with Hein Heinsen and Stig Brøgger, he was one of those who brought American trends in Minimalism to Denmark. Working towards an improved perception of space, they produced a number of rectilinear works including Fire kvadradiske rammer (Four Square Frames, 1966) and Fredens Port (Gate of Peace, 1982).

Møller then moved into sculpture where he could better represent mass media's oversimplification of a complex world. In 1980, he completed his Stjerne, Stjerneport og Stjernefragment (Star, Star Gate and Star Fragment), a decoration for Aalborg University. The open star represents a quest for dialogue, a theme which often characterizes his work. The portrait of Queen Margrethe on Danish 10 and 20 kroner coins since 2001 is the work of Mogens Møller. From 2004 to 2007, together with Heinsen and Brøgger, he carried out comprehensive decoration work at the Ollerup School of Gymnastics on the island of Funen.

From 1989 to 1998, Møller was a professor of sculpture at the Royal Danish Academy of Fine Arts.

== Awards ==
In 1988, Møller was awarded the Eckersberg Medal and, in 1994, the Thorvaldsen Medal.

== Literature ==
- Møller, Mogens; Bukdahl, Else Marie (1988). Mogens Møller: Malmö konsthall, Nordjyllands kunstmuseum, Stalke Project. Edition Stalke. ISBN 978-87-982778-1-1.
- Møller, Mogens; Neergaard, Ulrikke; The Bunker Secret Society; Dahlin, Dorte; Havshøj, Jane; Nefer Olsen, Kasper; Hornung, Peter Michael; Bukdahl, Else Marie (2016). VÆRK. Strandberg Publishing. ISBN 978-87-92894-72-4.
