= Danish War Museum =

Coordinates: 55°40′28″N 12°34′49″E

The Danish War Museum
- Krigsmuseet

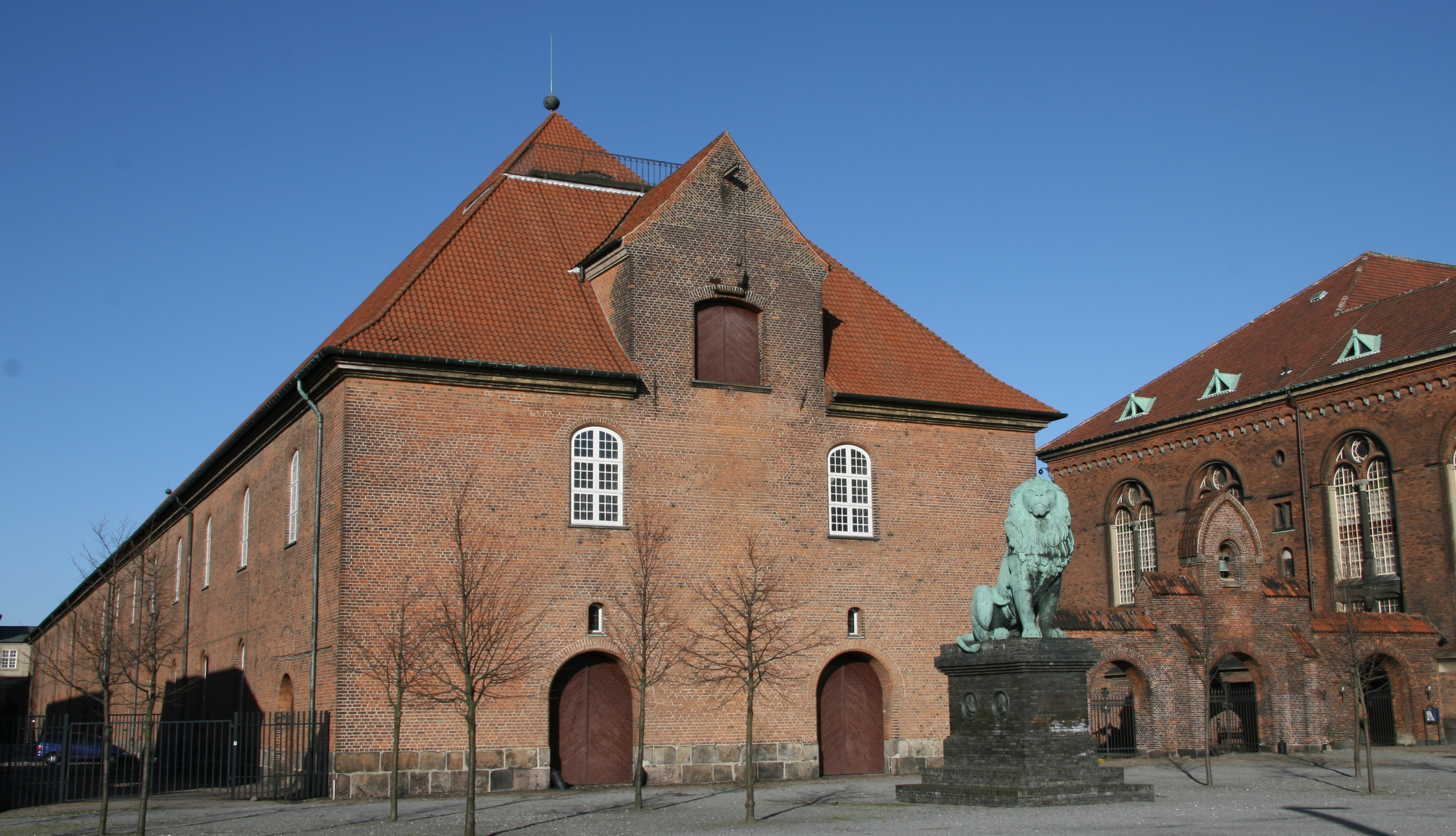
- Former name: Royal Danish Arsenal Museum (Danish: Tøjhusmuseet)
- Established: 1928
- Location: Christian IV's Arsenal Slotsholmen; Copenhagen, Denmark
- Type: Military museum
- Collection size: 100,000
- Visitors: 71,530 (2016)
- Director: Jens Carl Kirchmeier-Andersen
- Owner: National Museum of Denmark
- Public transit access: Stormbroen, Nationalmuseet (Vindebrogade)
- Website: Official website

The Danish War Museum (Danish: Krigsmuseet) is a museum of military history and arms on Slotsholmen in central Copenhagen, Denmark. It is located in Christian IV's Arsenal (Danish: Tøjhuset), from which it takes its former name. On 1 July 2018, the name was changed from the Royal Danish Arsenal Museum (Tøjhusmuseet) to The Danish War Museum, in order to make it easier for guest to discern the nature of the museum.

== History ==
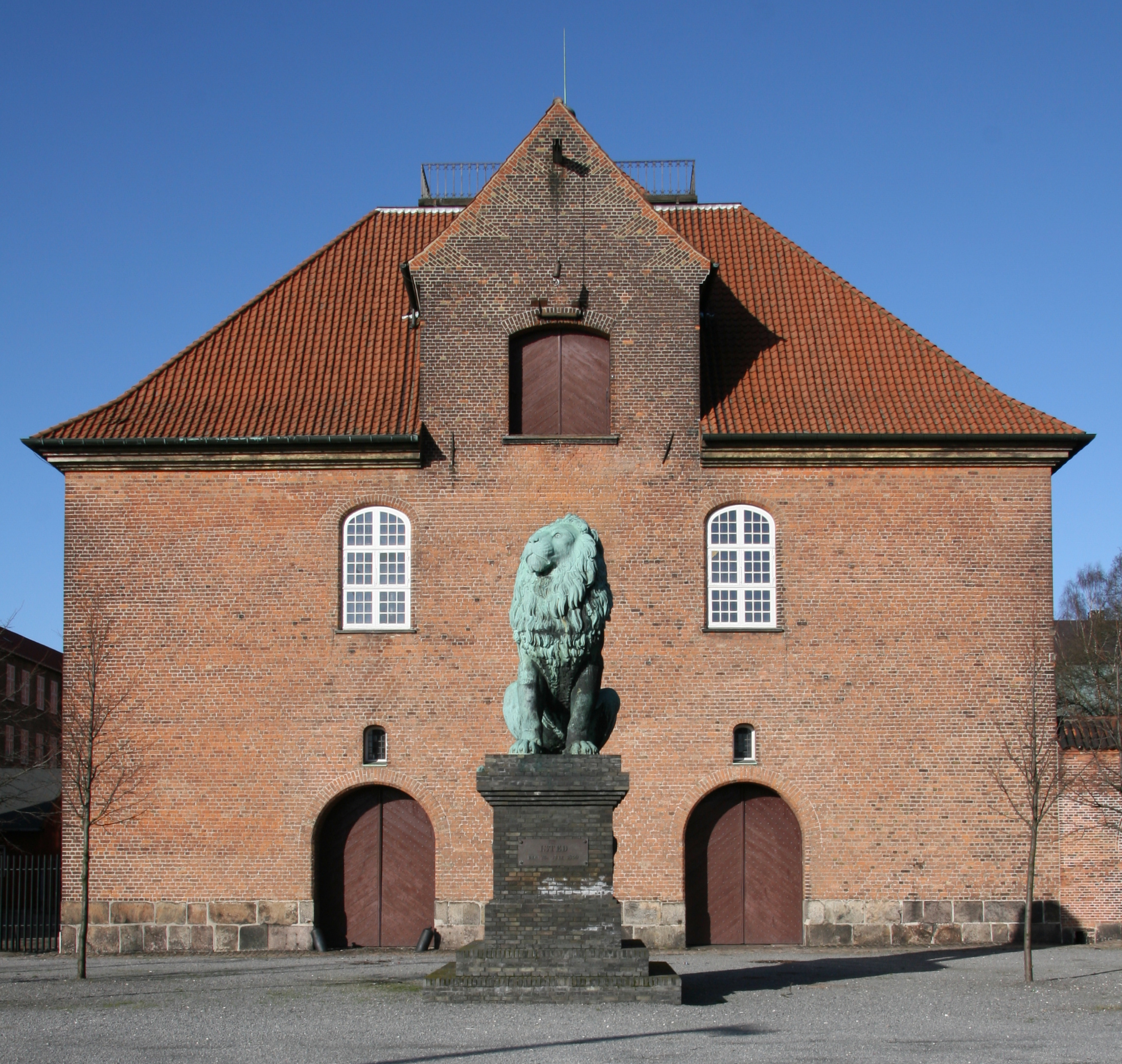
The Isted Lion outside Tøjhuset on Søren Kierkegaards Plads

Tøjhuset was built from 1593 to 1604 as an arsenal, part of a new naval harbour constructed by Christian IV. It is 163 metres long and built around a central harbour basin. The building served as an arsenal well into the 19th century but already from the 1680s, it also housed historic collections. In the 1880s the building had become too small and a new arsenal was constructed in what is now known as the district Islands Brygge. In 1926 the current museum was founded in the building.

Outside the Tøjhus building, facing the harbour, stood the Isted Lion which was reclaimed from Germany in 1945 after World War II. It was moved to Flensburg in 2011.

== Collections ==
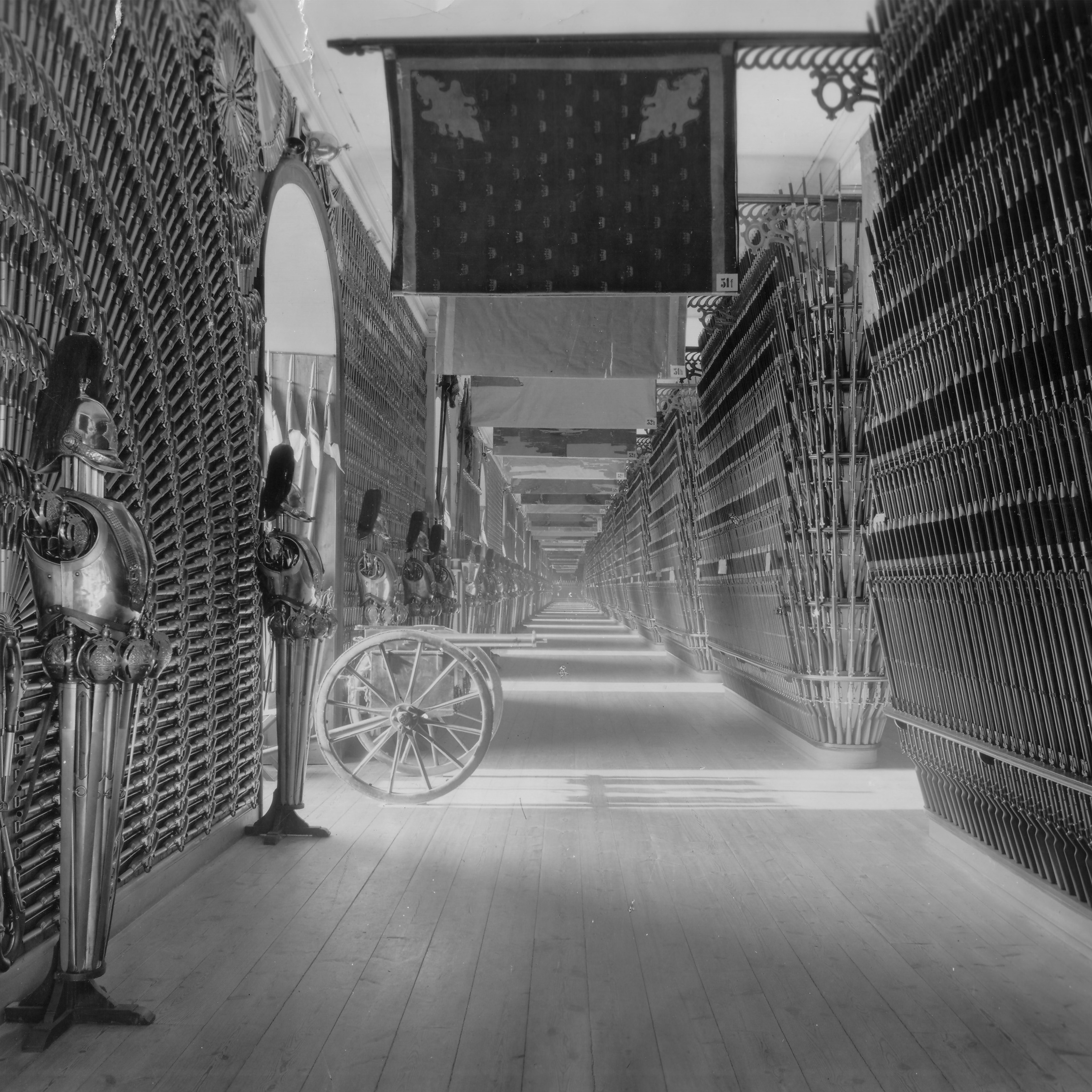
The old gallery, showcasing the large collection of arms

The collections of weapons are some of the most extensive in the world, with more than 100,000 in their collection. More than 8000 swords, pistols, armours, machine guns and other weapons and military paraphernalia are displayed in the museum's Great Gallery and the Canon Galley boasts more than 300 canons dating from the 16th century to present days.

== See also ==
- List of museums in and around Copenhagen
