= Cai Hegermann-Lindencrone =

Danish general (1807–1893)

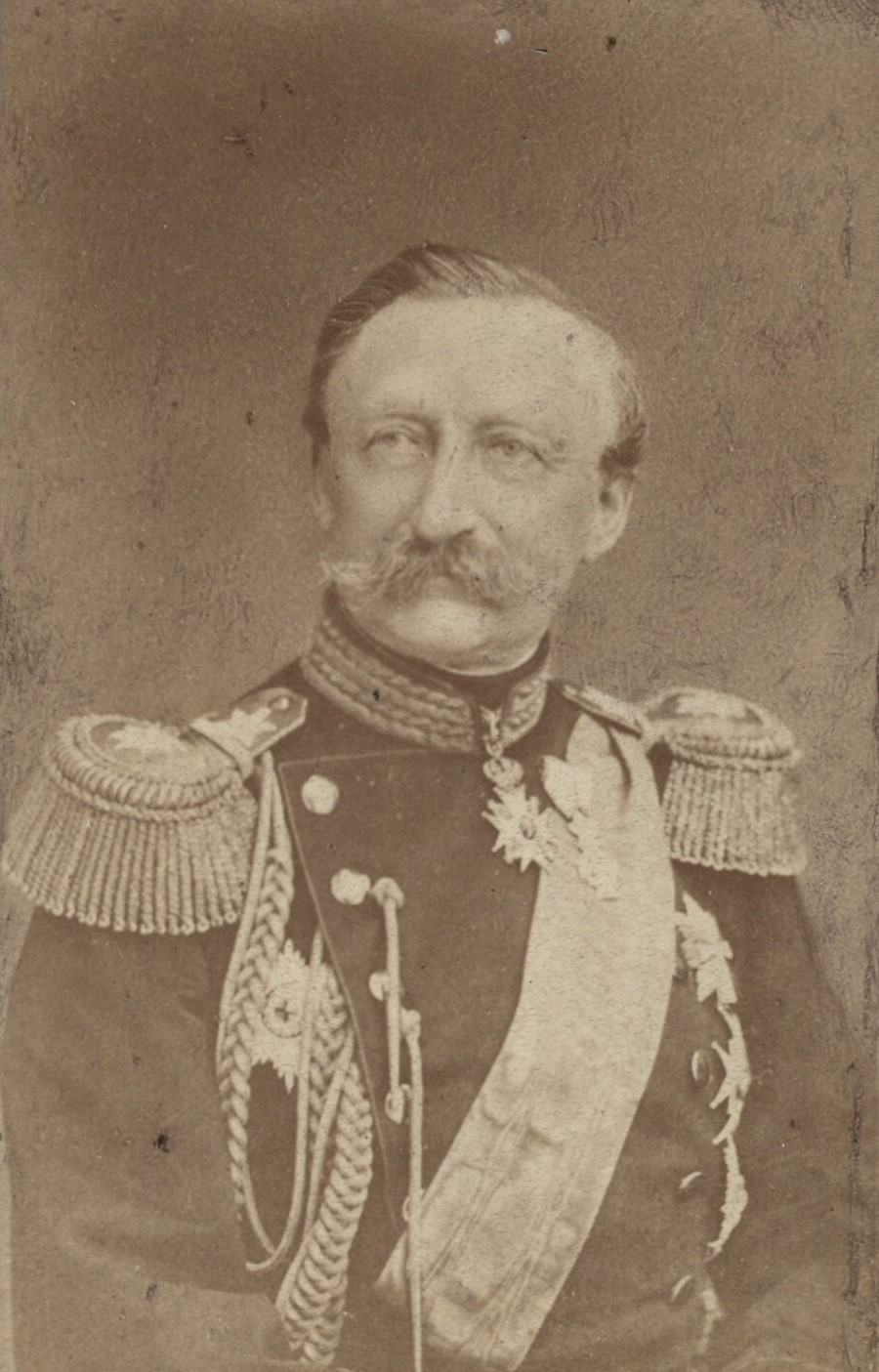
- Born: 17 May 1807; Copenhagen, Copenhagen Municipality, Denmark-Norway
- Died: 22 December 1893 (aged 86); Copenhagen, Copenhagen Municipality, Denmark
- Burial place: Garrison Cemetery, Copenhagen, Denmark
- Military career
- Allegiance: Denmark
- Branch: Royal Danish Army
- Service years: 1816 – 1878
- Rank: Generallieutenant
- Nickname: General Backwards
- Conflicts: First Schleswig War: Battle of Kolding; Battle of Fredericia; Battle of Isted; Second Schleswig War: Battle of Vejle

Cai Ditlev Hegermann-Lindencrone (1807–1893) was a Danish general and politician who was the main Danish commander at the Battle of Vejle during the Second Schleswig War as well as the personal adjutant general of Frederik VII. He was also the father of Johan Hegermann-Lindencrone and Fritz Hegermann-Lindencrone.

== Early life ==
He was the son of the Norwegian-born Lieutenant General Johan Hendrik Hegermann-Lindencrone (1765–1849) and his wife Louise Hegermann-Lindencrone. In 1816 he became a volunteer in the Royal Danish Army and studied at the Royal Danish Military Academy in Copenhagen along with Helmuth von Moltke the Elder, whom he became friends with. Hegermann-Lindencrone graduated in 1819 he was promoted to a full cadet. In 1822, he became senior lieutenant and in the same year, he became a second lieutenant à la suite in the infantry but didn't become a full second lieutenant until 1828. In 1830 he was transferred to the cavalry, in which he thereafter remained and went through the various educational schools. In 1833 he was promoted to first lieutenant and was employed the following year by the Guard Hussar Regiment. On 1838, he was made second Senior lieutenant and in 1842, promoted to second class senior lieutenant.

== First Schleswig War ==
At the outbreak of First Schleswig War, he issued a call to the reserve crew of his department for a voluntary meeting, thereby setting up a reserve squadron, with which he from the end of April participated in the campaign under the right flank corps. 1849 he was first at Rye's Corps, 1850 at the 2nd Division.

With his squadron he took part in the affair at Hoptrup, in 1849 he also received command of the 4th Dragon Regiment's 2nd Squadron and participated with the division in the Battle of Kolding, the fencing at Viuf and the Battle of Fredericia; shortly before that he had promoted to major. In 1850, Hegermann-Lindencrone served mainly as outpost commander and participated in the Battle of Isted, after which he became lieutenant colonel and the following year commander of the Holstein dragon regiment, which in 1852 was relocated to Næstved in the 2nd dragon regiment. He was promoted to Colonel in 1857 he became adjutant general and chief of King Frederik VII's adjutant staff and major general the following year but resigned in 1859 due to various political influences.

In 1861 he was elected a member of the Folketing for Copenhagen's 6th constituency, but was not re-elected in 1864. In 1860 Hegermann-Lindencrone became commander of the 1st Cavalry Brigade and in 1863 Inspector General of the Cavalry. That same autumn, he was sent to Russia to inform the King of the change of Russian throne and to conduct political negotiations. After returning home, he was offered to take over the council presidency but declined the offer, after which he became adjutant general and chief of the king's adjutant staff as well as lieutenant general.

== Second Schleswig War ==
In early 1864, however, he was placed at the head of the 4th Division, speaking in the War Council on 4 February for an offensive strike against the enemy; but when the Dannevirke position was vacated the next day, he was ordered to Jutland to defend that part of Denmark, as the 3rd division was also temporarily subordinated to him. On 8 March Hegermann-Lindencrone sought to stop the Austrians at the Battle of Vejle, after which he returned to the Skanderborg area. Faced with the great power of the Austrians, he found it right to evacuate the post in secret on the night of 11–12 March, and to return to Mors, whereby the enemy was misled. The retreat was rightly sharply criticized by Dagbladet, which called him "General Backwards" due to his passivity. After his troops had rested and received a lack of equipment, he moved south again in April and made a plan with General Christian Lunding to throw the enemy out of Jutland and to threaten the Prussian Army at Dybbøl but the plan had to abandoned as when a new Prussian brigade arrived on the battlefield, the 4th Division had to retreat. In May, Hegermann-Lindencrone became commander of the North Jutland army corps, consisting of 2nd and 4th divisions, and a new offensive movement across the Limfjord was prepared, but the armistice halted its execution, and the corps was abolished on June 24, after which Hegermann-Lindencrone again became commander of the 4th Division, which came to Funen.

== Later years ==
When the war was over, he again became adjutant general and commander of the cavalry as well as 1865 commanding general in the 1st General Command District .

In considering the Army Act of 1867, he criticized the proposals, especially the restriction of cavalry, and shortly after the law was passed, he was fired, retired and put on hold as a 60-year-old because the Minister of War Waldemar Raasløff wanted the Army Act of July 6 on the same year where new conscripts would arrive. Hegermann-Lindencrone remained in high favor with the king, who had held on to him to the last. After standing à la suite until 1878, he was dismissed on application due to age. In the following years he wrote a military-political paper on the War of 1864 and its Influence on our Army, which provoked a response from Ditlev Gothard Monrad, which in turn spawned another writing by Hegermann-Lindencrone.

He became a Valet de chambre in 1828, a chamberlain in 1858, a knight of Dannebrog in 1845, commander in 1858 and received the Grand Cross in 1865.

He is buried in Garrison Cemetery, Copenhagen.

=== Legacy ===
There are portrait paintings in family ownership by Just Holm 1844 and Carl Wentorf 1887. There was a lithograph 1856 from Em. Bærentzen & Co. after drawing by Eduard Hansen. A Xylography in 1889 and after a picture from 1866 by Hans Peter Hansen in 1894. There was also a Satirical xylography in 1864 on the poem "General Baglæns".
