= Hans Charles Johannes Beck =

Danish colonel (1817–1890)

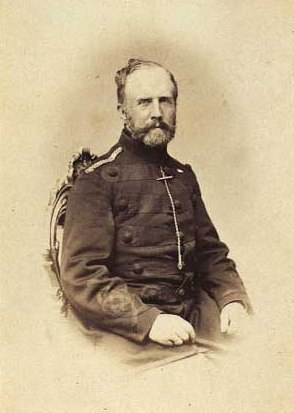
- Beck in 1864
- Born: 1 October 1817; Saint Croix, Danish West Indies, Denmark
- Died: 8 January 1890 (aged 72); Copenhagen, Copenhagen Municipality, Denmark
- Spouse: Elisabeth Louise Charlotte Juel (m. 1852)
- Military career
- Allegiance: Denmark
- Branch: Royal Danish Army
- Service years: 1831–1873
- Rank: Oberst
- Conflicts: First Schleswig War: Battle of Schleswig; Battle of Kolding; Battle of Fredericia; Battle of Fredericia; Battle of Helligbæk; Battle of Isted; Second Schleswig War: Battle of Sankelmark; Battle of Lundby

Hans Charles Johannes Beck (1 October 1817 – 8 January 1890) was a Danish Colonel of the First Schleswig War and the Second Schleswig War. He was the main commander of the Battle of Lundby as well as a recipient of the Commander's Cross of the Order of the Dannebrog.

== Early career and First Schleswig War ==
Beck was born on 1 October 1817 at Saint Croix, the son of Artillery Captain Hans Peter Gustav Beck, who was the fort commander. After Hans' death in 1822, Johannes Beck moved to Copenhagen along with his mother Gertrude Cathrine née Smith. He became a cadet in 1831 and was appointed as a second lieutenant in 1838 within the 2nd Life Regiment until he was transferred to the Royal Regiment from 1839 to 1844 when he graduated from the military college and became a candidate for the Danish general staff. By the time the First Schleswig War broke out in 1848, Beck was a first lieutenant, becoming an adjutant within the 1st Infantry Brigade. He participated in the Battle of Schleswig and the Siege of Steppinge. For his services, he was promoted to captain and awarded the Knight's Cross of the Order of the Dannebrog. In 1849, he was made a member of the general staff and became deputy commander of the Ryes Corps which he would command in the Battle of Kolding and would participate in further skirmishes at Dons-Almind, Vejle and Aarhus during the retreat through Northern Jutland and he would be awarded the Golden Medal of Merit.

A part of the corps was then sent as a brigade from Helgenæs to Fredericia as Beck became the chief of staff there and initially participated under Major General Olaf Rye until his death at the Battle of Fredericia and Beck was made the deputy chief of the general command in Jutland under General C. F. Moltke at the Battle of Helligbæk and at the Battle of Isted. After the peace treaty, he was first chief of staff of the Commandanture of Schleswig, later becoming deputy chief of staff at the general command in Northern Jutland and finally became the chief of staff at the general command at Holstein and Lauenborg in 1852. In 1857, Beck was promoted to major as he later made a long journey through Europe and then became chief of the general staff's tactical cepartment until his transfer to the 1st Division as chief of staff in 1863.

== Second Schleswig War ==
When the Second Schleswig War broke out, Beck was already a lieutenant colonel and commanded the 1st Infantry Regiment which he commanded during the Battle of Sankelmark. For personal courage during the battle, he was awarded the Commander's Cross of the Order of the Danebrog and later took part in the Battle of Vejle when the regiment was en route to Mors. After arriving at the island, he then attempted to head for Aalborg but the route ended up in failure due to continued Prussian harassment. Learning of a Prussian reconnaissance unit in the area he was at, Beck and his men began searching for the unit on July 3. Despite clear warnings about their geographical positions from the locals, Beck ordered his men in a bayonet charge against the Prussian soldiers during the Battle of Lundby. Beck's position gave the Prussian troops a clear vision of the Danish troops and led to accurate shots at the charging Danish soldiers which left 76 wounded and killed while the Prussians only suffered 3 wounded.

By the end of the war, he was given command of the 21st Battalion but the war had ended before he could commit any further actions. He was promoted to colonel in 1865 and commanded the 28th Battalion but retired in 1873 due to infirmity and received the Commander's Cross of the Order of the Dannebrog as part of his service.

== Political career and personal life ==
Beck married Elisabeth Louise Charlotte Juel, daughter of Major General Hans Adolph Juel in 1852. From 1858 to 1861, he was a Member of Parliament for Frederiksborg County's 2nd Constituency.
