= Garrison Cemetery, Copenhagen =

Cemetery in Copenhagen, Denmark

Coordinates: 55°41′42″N 12°35′02″E

Garrison Cemetery
- Garnisons Kirkegård
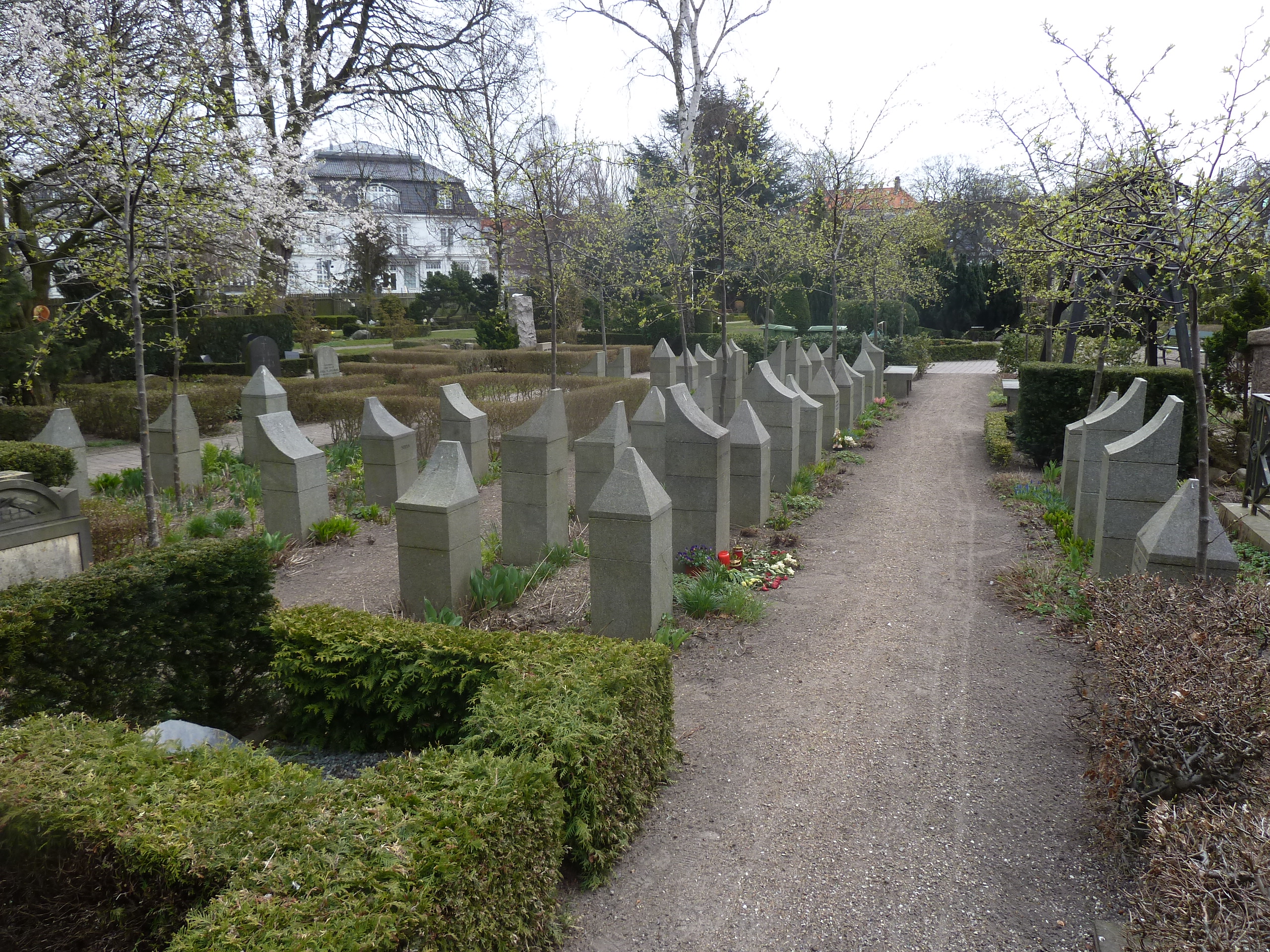
- Interactive map of Garrison Cemetery

Details
- Established: 1664
- Location: Østerbro, Copenhagen
- Country: Denmark
- Size: hectares
- Website: [garnisonskirkegaard Official web site]
- Find a Grave: Garrison Cemetery

Garrison Cemetery (Danish: Garnisons Kirkegård) is a cemetery in Copenhagen, Denmark. It was inaugurated in 1671 on a site just outside the Eastern City Gate, as a military cemetery complementing the naval Holmens Cemetery which had been inaugurated a few years earlier on a neighbouring site. Later the cemetery was opened to civilian burials as well.

Garrison Cemetery is an independent cemetery, managed by the parochial church council, placed under the army's highest authority.

== History ==
Originally named Soldaterkirkegården (Soldiers' Cemetery), Garrison Cemetery was founded by a decree from King Frederick III and laid out in 1664 on a site outside the Bastioned Fortifications, next to the main road leading in and out of the Eastern City Gate and opposite the naval Holmens Cemetery which was laid out around the same time. Burials began the same year but the site, former marshland, was rather unsuitable for the purpose since ground water levels made it hard to bury the bodies in sufficiently deep grounds. In 1671, some improvements were made when the site was enclosed by pallisades and ditches and the cemetery was officially inaugurated on 13 July 1671.

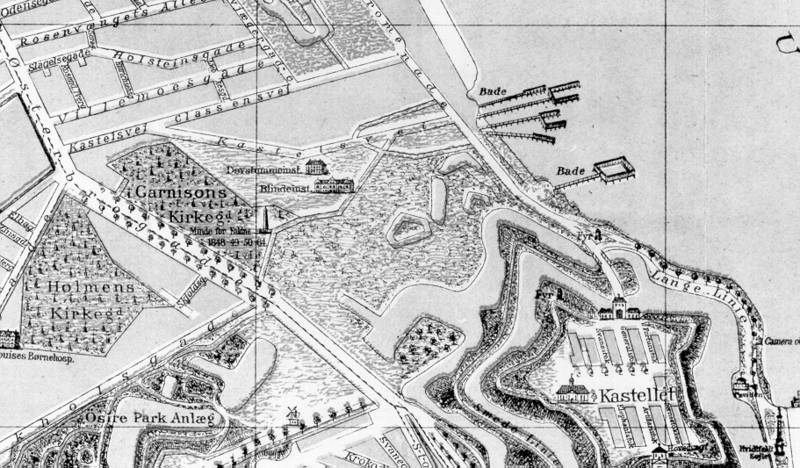
Detail from old map showing the location of Garrison Cemetery outside the Eastern City Gate

During the first decades, the cemetery remained relatively little used. In 1706, the Garrison Church was built on Sankt Annæ Plads. and in 1723 the Soldiers' Cemetery received its current name.

In 1711, Copenhagen was struck by an outbreak of plague which killed an estimated 23,000 citizens. In a move to control disease, the authorities provided that all victims of the plague, within 24 hours and without a ceremony, had to be buried at Garrison Cemetery or a Municipal Plague Cemetery which was set up next to it. In 1720, Garrison Cemetery was officially opened to civilian burials.

The cemetery was neglected and gradually fell into disrepair. In 1812 it was renovated and from then on began to attract more prominent citizens.

== Garrison Cemetery today ==
One of the many characteristics of the cemetery, are the many old graves, still owned by families, and war-monuments of fallen in the wars 1848–1850 and 1864.

== Interments ==
- Niels Andersen (1835–1911)
- Christian Henrik Arendrup
- Erni Arneson
- Ferdinand Bauditz
- Gustav Bauditz
- Peter Bauditz
- Sten Baadsgaard
- Hans Bendix
- Carl Bernhard
- Johannes Bjerg
- Fredbjørn Bjørnsson
- Nicolai Gottlieb Blædel
- Caspar Leuning Borch
- Valborg Borchsenius
- Poul Borum
- Caspar Johannes Boye
- Else Brems
- Mogens Brems
- Erik Bøgh
- Georg Carstensen
- Georg Christensen
- Inger Christensen
- Walter Christmas
- Flemming Dahl
- Benthe Frederikke Rafsted Dannemand
- John Davidsen
- Anton Dorph
- Frederik Dreyer
- Ernst Eberlein
- William Falck
- J. S. Fibiger
- Johannes Fibiger
- J. F. Fischer
- Preben Fjederholt
- John Frandsen
- Juan (Hans) Fugl
- Paul René Gauguin
- Johannes Grenness
- Signi Grenness
- Barbara Gress
- Hans Hansen
- N. C. Hansen
- Varvara Hasselbalch
- Jens Hecht-Johansen
- Cai Hegermann-Lindencrone
- Eva Heramb
- Aage Hertel
- Gustav Frederik Holm
- F. C. Holstein
- Kirsten Hüttemeier
- Jesper Høm
- Kirsten Høm
- H. E. Hørring
- Kræsten Iversen
- Johannes W. Jacobsen
- Palle Jacobsen
- Holger Jensen
- Jørn Jeppesen
- Tjek Jerne
- Anton Eduard Kieldrup
- Helvig Kinch
- Karl Frederik Kinch
- Tove Kjarval
- Ove Krak
- Thorvald Krak
- Lili Lani
- Buster Larsen
- Gorm Lertoft
- Otto Liebe
- Axel Liebmann
- Nanna Liebmann
- Albert Luther
- Vilhelm Herman Oluf Madsen
- Rasmus Malling-Hansen
- Kristian Mantzius
- Einer Mellerup
- Christian de Meza
- Louis Moe
- N. C. Monberg
- Karin Monk
- Gunnar Møller
- Johan Waldemar Neergaard
- Carl Neumann
- Henry Nielsen
- Jakob Nielsen
- Orson Nielsen
- H. G. Olrik
- Verner Panton
- Hortense Panum
- Peter Ludvig Panum
- Holger Pedersen
- Jens Louis Petersen
- Constantin Philipsen
- Mie Philipsen
- Preben Philipsen
- Axel Preisler
- Børge Ralov
- Kirsten Ralov
- Edvard Rambusch
- Kirsten Rolffes
- Thomas Rosenberg
- Tutta Rosenberg
- Olaf Rye
- Sophus Schack
- Ole Scherfig
- August Schiøtt
- Alfred Schmidt
- Svenn Seehusen
- Jørgen Selchau
- Flemming Skov
- Jørgen Sperling
- C. F. Sørensen
- August Saabye
- Hans Nicolai Thestrup
- Knud Thestrup
- C. F. Thomsen
- Christian Frederik Thorin
- Carl Thrane
- A. F. Tscherning
- Mona Vangsaae
- Jens Vige
- Emilie Walbom
- Soffy Walleen
- Per Wiking
- Hans Wright

The cemetery contains one Commonwealth war grave of World War II, a Danish officer of the British Royal Army Service Corps. Danish-born British Army Brigadier Percy Hansen, a Victoria Cross recipient, is also buried here.
