= Hazelwood School =

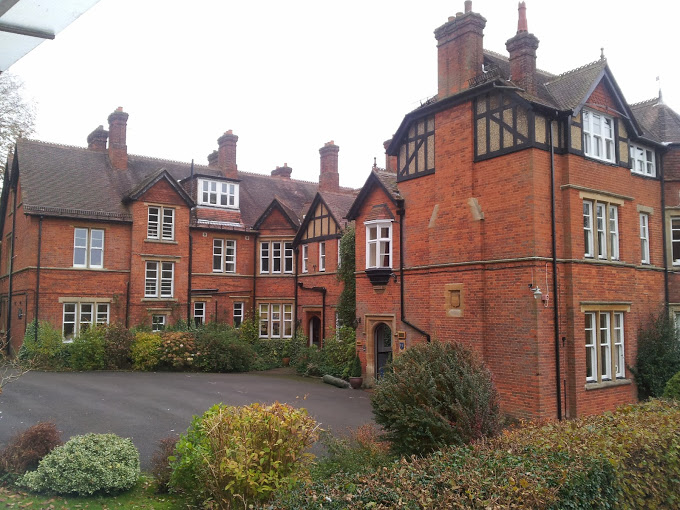
- The Victorian building

Location
- Wolf's Hill; Limpsfield; Oxted, Surrey, RH8 0QU; England; 51.24938°N 0.0089°E

Information
- Type: Private preparatory day school
- Motto: Latin: Spiritu Inspiratus (Lungfuls of Inspiration)
- Religious affiliation: Christian
- Established: 1890
- Founder: Edward Baily
- Department for Education URN: 513545 Tables
- Headmistress: Lindie Louw
- Gender: Co-educational
- Age: 3 months to 13 years
- Enrolment: ~578
- Houses: Baily, Dowling, Irving, Parry
- Website: http://www.hazelwoodschool.co.uk/

Hazelwood School is a private preparatory school in Limpsfield, Surrey, England.

The school was established in 1890 as a boarding school for boys aged 8–13 by Ruth and Edward Baily. Baily bought the land from the Titsey Place estate as he loved the views of the Weald and the Ashdown Forest and thought the site healthy and bracing. The first cohort of 38 pupils was accommodated and taught in a purpose-built Victorian building that remains at the centre of the school today.

In 1962 the school was bought by Tim Dowling and merged with his Bickley Hall School in Bromley, Kent—resulting in the double motto and double badge known today. Hazelwood School became a registered charity and was incorporated as a limited company in 1968. Girls were first admitted to the school and a pre-prep department established in 1978. Boarding continued at the school until 1999.

== History ==
=== 1880–1906 ===
Edward Baily founded Hazelwood School as an educational boarding establishment for boys in 1880. The first site for the school was in Balsham, Cambridgeshire, with just two boys. In 1884, with a dozen more boys, the school moved to Warlingham in Surrey before finally settling on our current site in Limpsfield, Surrey, in 1890 with 38 pupils.

Following Baily's retirement in 1906, William Lifton-Wynne, who had worked at the school over many years, took on its management. This period in the school's history was overshadowed by war and, less seriously, recurring attacks of influenza. In the post-war period, Hugh Crauford Irving took over as headmaster. He established the house system with two houses named after old boys who had served during the First World War, Geoffrey Cather and Percy Hansen.

=== 1930s and 1940s ===
Mr Parry took over as headmaster in 1938, on the eve of the Second World War. During the war, the site was bombed, which resulted in the loss of the original Victorian pavilion and fives courts. These were rebuilt in the late 1940s along with the Oak and Chestnut cottages, which needed to house the growing number of boys and staff.

Chestnut was used as married quarters for staff and accommodation for senior boys. Oak cottage housed three masters, matron and more dormitories for senior boys. In 1949, a new changing room was also added to the site. By the end of the 1940s, there were in the region of 70 boarders so another house was added to the house system: Blacker-Douglass, named after another old boy who served in the First World War.

=== 1950s and 1960s ===
Throughout the 1950s, there were 70 boys boarding at Hazelwood. Despite the healthy numbers on roll, post-war austerity and rebuilding, necessitated by wartime bombing, meant that the school fell on hard times.

In 1962, Godfrey R V "Tim" Dowling (born 1917) bought the school and merged with his own school, Bickley Hall, Bromley. The school mottoes also merged, resulting in the double badge emblem.

The school remained privately owned by Mr Dowling until 1968 when it became a registered charity and was incorporated as a limited company. The newly formed board of trustees / governors bought the freehold from the Dowlings. Mr Dowling remained as head until his retirement in 1974.

=== 1970s ===
In 1972, Mr Dowling oversaw the completion of a series of new buildings to the site. A multi-purpose hall replaced the 1940s cricket pavilion and fives court. This was used as a gymnasium, dining hall, music room and kitchen space, with three classrooms, library and staff room upstairs. More classrooms were built in front and to the side of the main Victorian building.

In the late 1970s, new headmaster Mr Bawtree had Chestnut cottage adapted for use as a pre-preparatory school for children aged 5–7 years. Oak cottage continued to be used staff accommodation and all boarders were moved to the main Victorian building. In 1979, two lower tennis courts were added.

With a new pre-prep and the admittance of girls, the number of pupils on roll rose considerably during this period. A new house system was established in 1976: the four houses were named after past Hazelwood headmasters: Baily, Irving, Parry and Dowling.

=== 1980s ===
Mr Bawtree continued his development of the site into the 1980s with a new indoor swimming pool to replace the outdoor swimming bath in front of Oak cottage. He also added a new Creative Arts Centre. In 1987, a violent storm caused the lavish Victorian chapel to be destroyed so plans were put in place for its replacement.

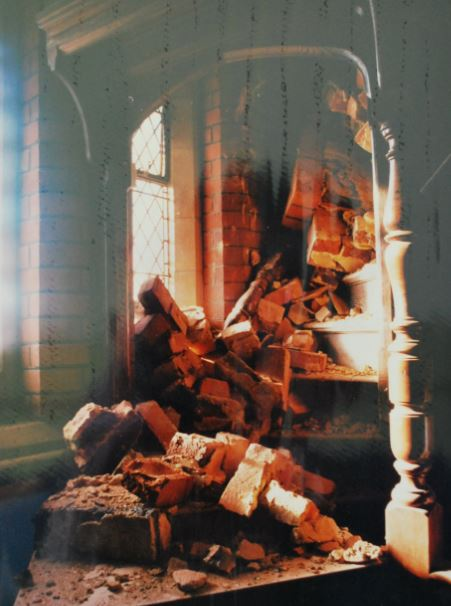
Hazelwood Chapel destroyed in the storm of 1987

=== 1990s ===
In 1990, the new chapel was opened. The new chapel formed part of a performing arts block, which housed the music department and a theatre. Mr Bawtree retired in 1995 and was succeeded by Mr Synge. In 1996, Mr Synge opened the new purpose-built Chestnut building to house the increasing number of pre-prep children attending the school. This gave them their own classrooms, hall and playground. In 1999, a technology block called Willow was added to house the ICT suite, science laboratories, design technology room, art studio and kiln room. The development of this front part of the site led to the relocation of the cricket pitch and the addition of more car-parking space to the front of the school. Also in 1999, the boarding element of the school ceased and Hazelwood begun to operate as an independent day school.

=== 2000–10 ===
In 2003, the Sports Hall was built adjoining Willow building. Following the departure of Mr Synge in 2004, Mr Hawkins took on the post of headmaster for a year, followed Mr McDuff in 2005. In 2009, Hazelwood merged with Laverock School, a local girls' preparatory school, situated in central Oxted. The Laverock site was developed to open as a 50-week nursery called the Larks, operating as part of the Hazelwood charity.

=== 2010 to date ===
Maxine Shaw became headmistress in 2010.

In 2014 building started to replace the 1970s classrooms to the front and side of the main building.

In 2015, the Larks was rebranded as Hazelwood School Nursery and Early Years for children aged 6 months to 4 years.

Mrs Shaw left the school at the end of the summer term 2016 to take over as headmistress of St. Paul's Junior School (previously called Colet Court) Lindie Louw took over as the school's second headmistress from September 2016, after many years as deputy head at the school.

== Notable old Hazelwoodians ==
- Geoffrey Cather, soldier, recipient of the Victoria Cross for gallantry in the face of the enemy
- Percy Hansen, soldier and recipient of the Victoria Cross
- Tom Jameson, cricketer
- Alexander Keiller, archaeologist, aerial photographer, businessman and philanthropist
- Henry Surtees, motor racing driver
- Jeremy Thorpe, politician

== Notable former members of staff ==
- Sir Michael Tippett, composer
- Vernon Scannell, poet and author
- Christopher Fry, playwright
