= Lundby, Aalborg =

Village in Aalborg Municipality, Denmark

Coordinates: 56°58′11″N 10°0′27″E

Lundby is an old farming village on the highway between Aalborg and Hadsund, about 12 km southeast of Aalborg. Lundby is included in Gunderup Sogn and Aalborg Municipality. North of Lundby are Lundby Bakker and Krat.

On the hill slope south of Lundby the Battle of Lundby took place on 3 July 1864. There is a monument at the highway and a small memorial collection at the town that is open at the anniversary of the battle.

== Notable people ==
- Anders Andersen-Lundby (1841 in Lundby - 1923) a Danish landscape painter, associated with winter landscapes
