= Anders Andersen-Lundby =

Danish landscape painter

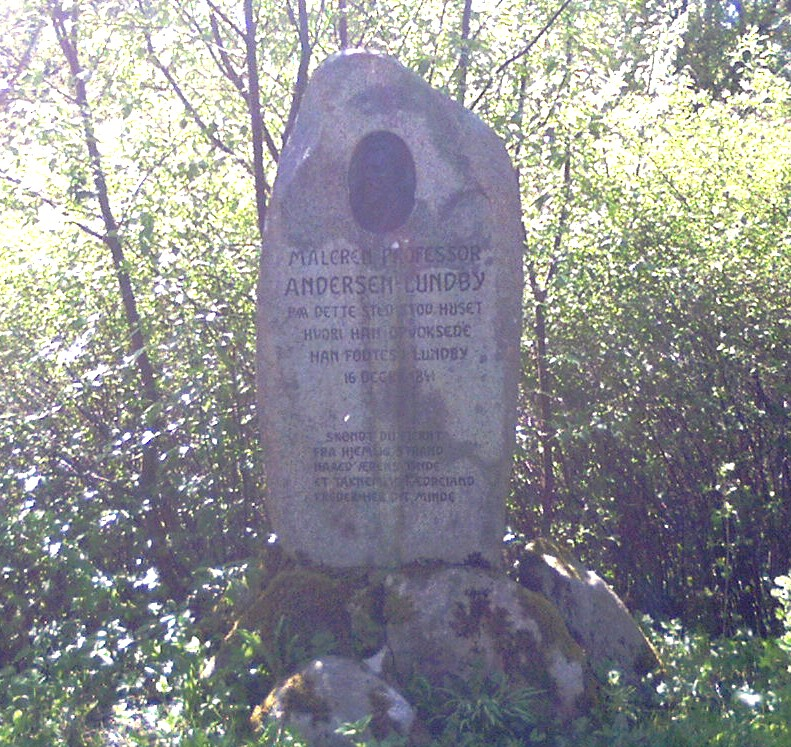
Monument to Andersen-Lundby placed where he grew up

Anders Andersen-Lundby (December 16, 1841 – January 4, 1923) was a Danish landscape painter. He was most associated with winter landscapes.

== Biography ==
Anders Andersen-Lundby was born in Lundby, Denmark. He grew up in Lundby near Aalborg. In 1861, when he was twenty, Andersen-Lundby traveled to Copenhagen, and there he exhibited his works for the first time in 1864. By 1870, he gained popularity especially with his winter landscapes from both Denmark and southern Germany, most often with fallen snow or thaw.

In 1876, he moved to Munich with his family where he exhibited his paintings. He frequently visited Denmark and participated in exhibitions there. He exhibited at the Charlottenborg Spring Exhibition 1864–1913.

== Personal life ==
In 1865, he married Thora Adelheid Børgesen (1842–1911). He died in Munich in 1923.

== Gallery ==
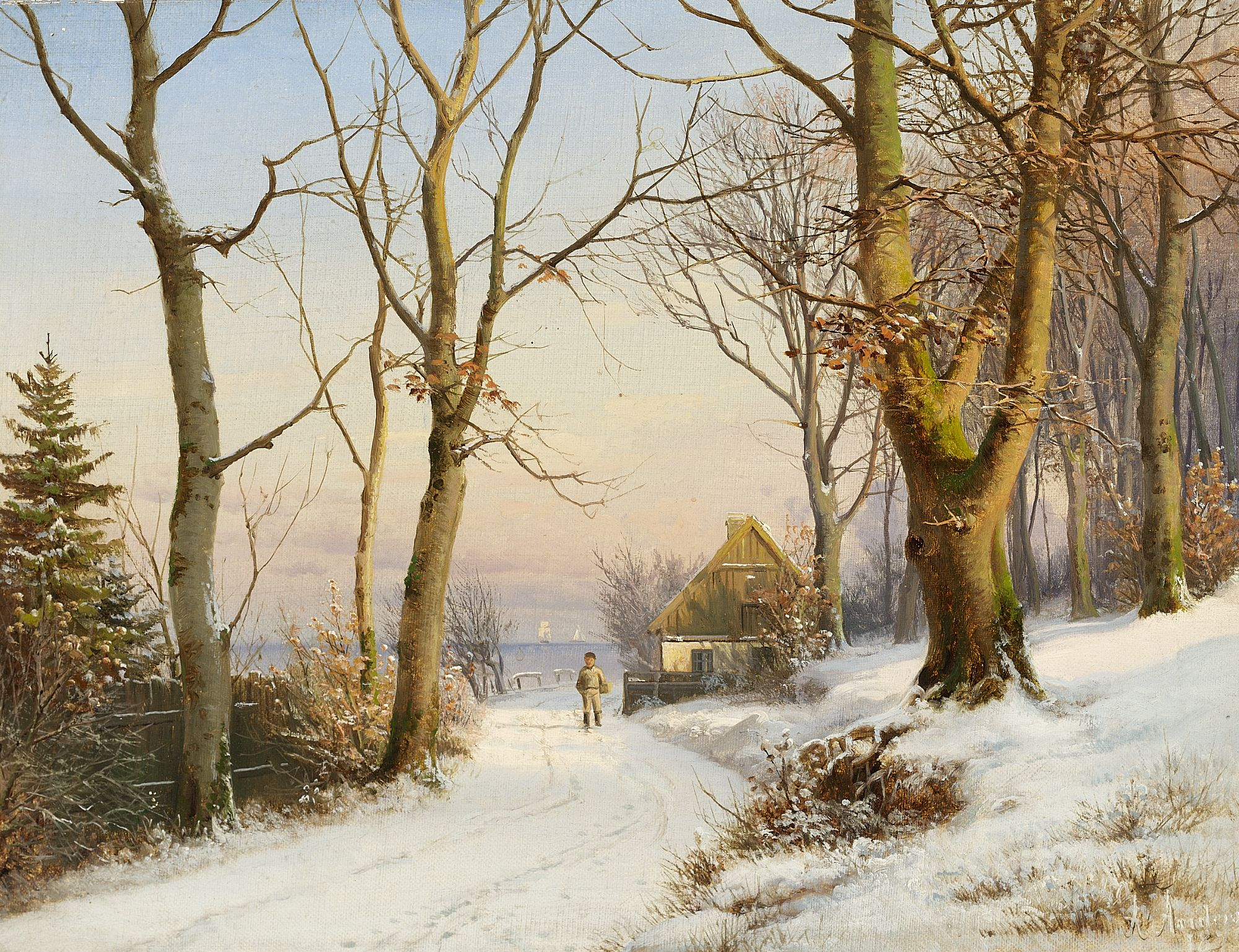
Winter's Day near the Sound

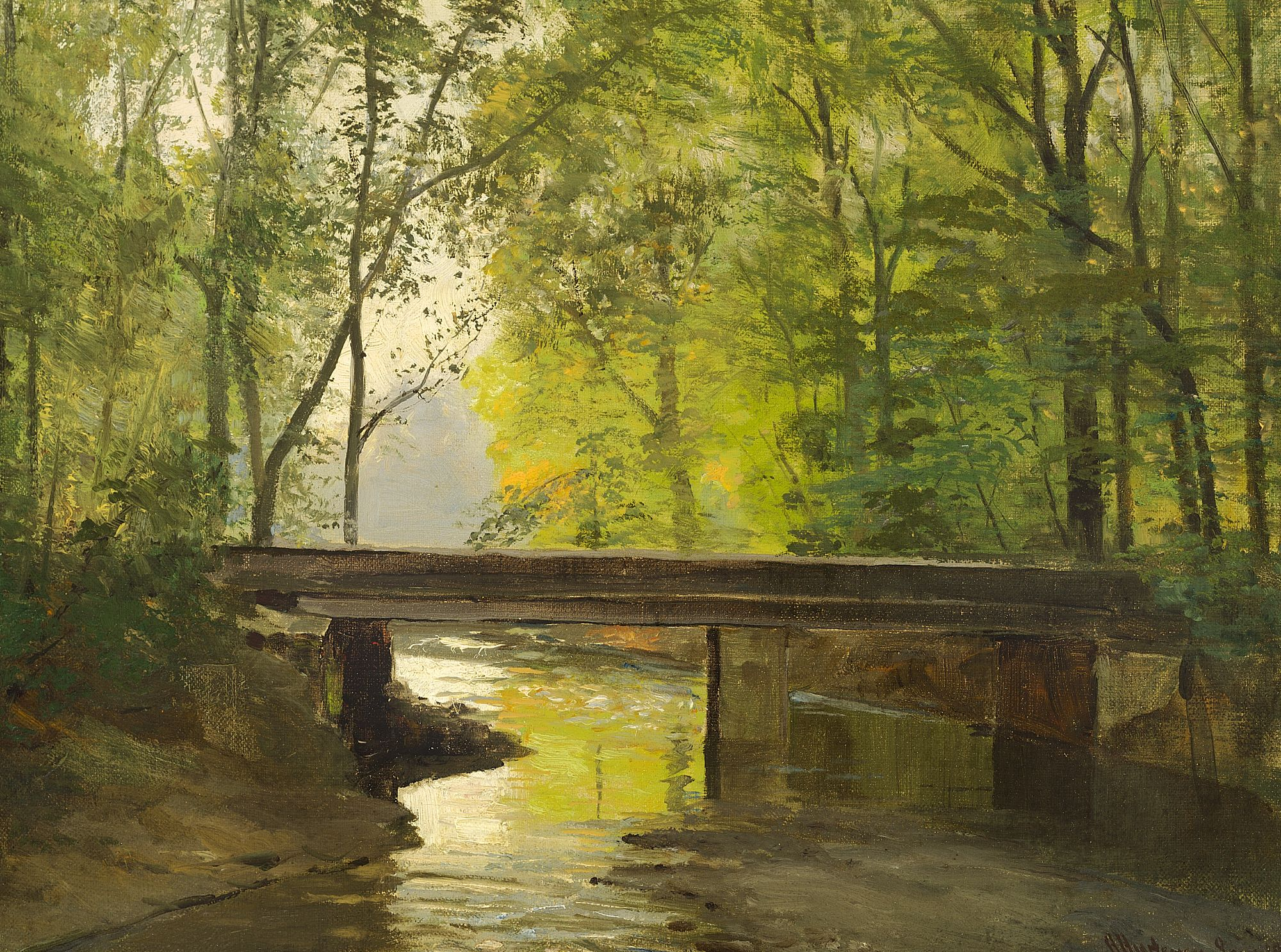
River running through a forest

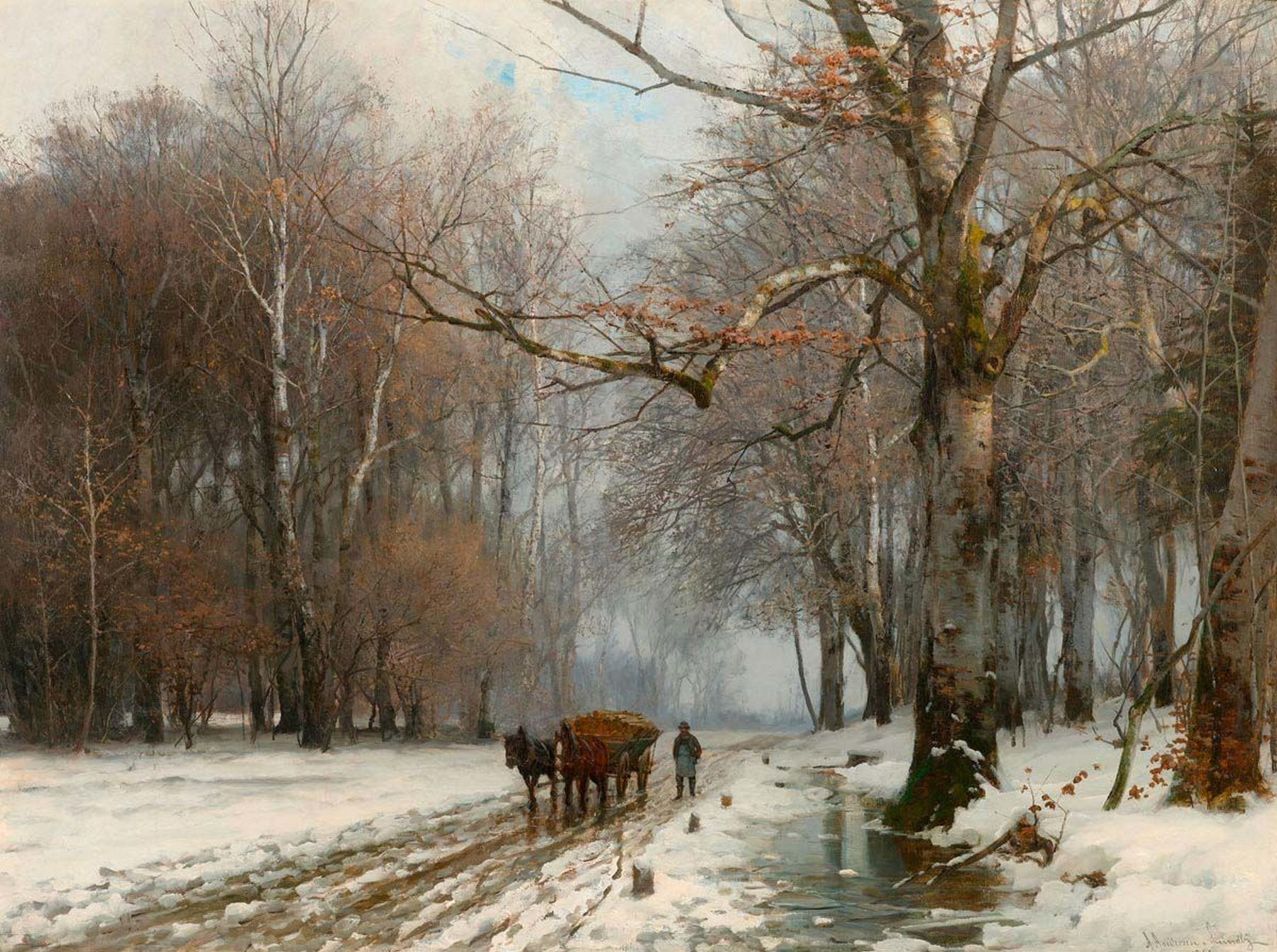
Wintery landscape with a farmer leading a horsewagon

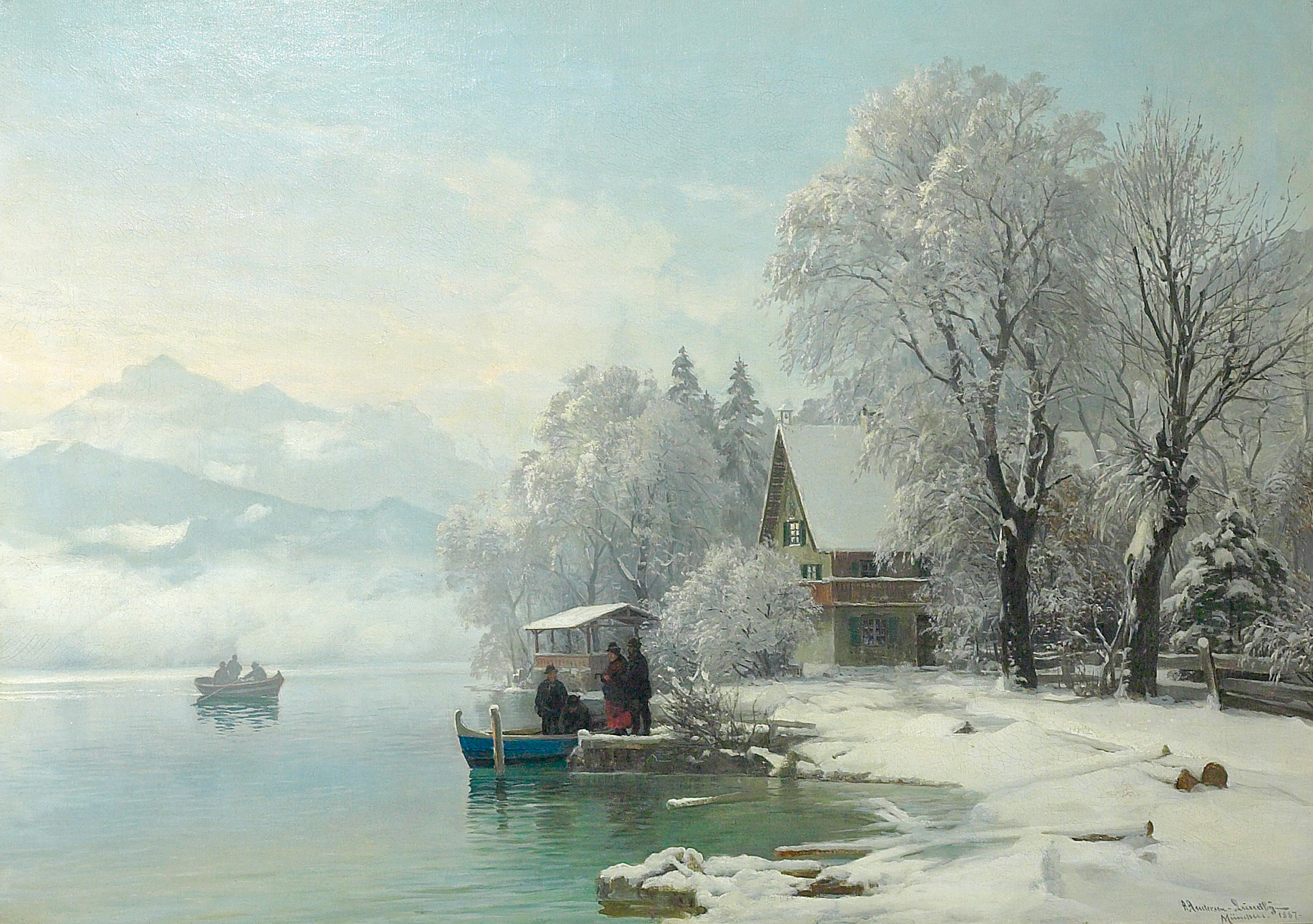
Winter day at the lake
