= Battle of Lundby =

Battle of the Second Schleswig War

- Part of the Second Schleswig War
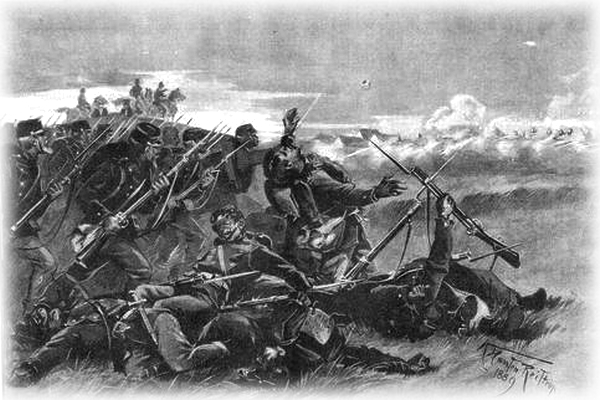
- Illustration of the Battle of Lundby by Captain F. C. Schiøtt
Date	3 July 1864
Location	Lundby, Denmark 56.966°N 10.007°E
Result	Prussian victory

Belligerents
Prussia	Denmark

Commanders and leaders
(Kingdom of Prussia) Capt. von Schlutterbach	(Denmark) Lt-Col. H. C. J. Beck

Units involved
1st Company, Niederschlesisches Infanterieregiment 50	5th Company, 1st Regiment

Strength
124 men	160 men

Casualties and losses
3 wounded	32 killed 44 wounded 20 captured 2 missing Total: 98

The Battle of Lundby took place south of Lundby in northeast Himmerland on 3 July 1864 in the Second Schleswig War. A Danish company of the First Regiment tried a head-on bayonet charge down a long hillside towards a Prussian company, but was stopped 20 meters in front of the earth dike that the Prussians lay in cover behind. It was the last battle of the Second Schleswig War, and resulted in great Danish losses.

== Sources ==
- Bjørke, Sven m.fl.: Krigen 1864 : Den anden slesvigske krig i politisk og krigshistorisk belysning, København 1968.
- Nielsen, Søren: 1. Infanteri=Regiment i Vendsyssel : Kampene ved LUNDBY og HEDEGAARDE d. 3/7 1864, København, 1967.
- Schiøtt, F.C.: Affairen ved Lundby, København 1877.
- Stevns, Arne: Vor Hær I Krig og Fred, Nordiske Landes Bogforlag, 1943, bind II side 322-323.
- Sørensen, Carl Harding m.fl.: "Lundbyaffæren", Tidsskriftet Skalk 1997 nr. 3, side 20-26.
- Thygesen, Peter: Træfningen ved Lundby 3. juli 1864, Næstved 2002.
