= Percy Hansen =

Recipient of the Victoria Cross

- Born: 26 October 1890; Durban, South Africa
- Died: 12 February 1951 (aged 60); Copenhagen, Denmark
- Burial place: Garrison Cemetery, Copenhagen
- Military career
- Allegiance: United Kingdom
- Branch: British Army
- Service years: 1911–1946
- Rank: Brigadier
- Service number: 6724
- Unit: Lincolnshire Regiment
- Commands: 2nd Battalion, Lincolnshire Regiment
- Conflicts: First World War; Arab revolt in Palestine; Second World War
- Awards: Victoria Cross; Distinguished Service Order; Military Cross; Mentioned in Despatches (5); Croix de guerre (France); Commander of the Royal Order of St. Olav (Norway); Officer of the Legion of Merit (United States)

Brigadier Percy Howard Hansen, VC, DSO, MC (26 October 1890 – 12 February 1951) was a British Army officer and recipient of the Victoria Cross (VC), the highest award for gallantry in the face of the enemy that can be awarded to personnel of the British and Commonwealth forces.

== Early life ==
Hansen was born into a wealthy and well-connected Danish family that settled first in South Africa then, after 1900, in London. He was educated at preparatory schools in Hazelwood, Limpsfield, Surrey and Oxted, Surrey; then at Eton College (from 20 September 1904). His father, Viggo Julius Hansen, was naturalised as a British subject in 1910, so that his son could join the British Army.

== Military career ==
After officer training at the Royal Military College, Sandhurst, Hansen was commissioned into the Lincolnshire Regiment on 4 March 1911.

=== First World War ===
Hansen was appointed as a temporary captain shortly after the outbreak of war in 1914, as adjutant in the 6th (Service) Battalion of the Lincolnshire Regiment, and his promotion was made permanent in the following April. He fought with his battalion, a recently created Kitchener's Army unit composed of civilian volunteers, during the Gallipoli campaign in the summer of 1915. On 9 August 1915 at Yilghin Bumu, Hansen's battalion was forced to withdraw while assaulting Scimitar Hill. Hansen and volunteers repeatedly moved back and forth under heavy fire to successfully rescue six wounded men from capture, or death by burning. Hansen was consequently awarded the Victoria Cross.

A month later, Hansen won the Military Cross for performing a reconnaissance mission at Suvla Bay. On the night of 9 September 1915, he carried out a solo reconnaissance of the coast, carrying only a revolver and a blanket for disguise. He successfully located an important Turkish firing position.

Due to ill-health, Hansen was eventually transferred to France and appointed brigade major to the 170th (2/1st North Lancashire) Brigade. He remained a staff officer for the rest of the war, during which he served with the II Anzac Corps. He was made a Companion of the Distinguished Service Order (DSO) for another reconnaissance mission during the Battle of Passchendaele in 1917.

=== Between the wars ===
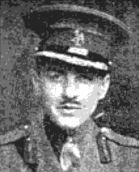
Hansen in later life.

Remaining in the army after the war, Hansen attended the Staff College, Camberley, and, for most of the interwar period, served in numerous staff positions. After graduating, he then served as a brigade major with the 8th Infantry Brigade, part of the 3rd Infantry Division, then serving in Southern Command, before becoming a brigade major with the 4th Infantry Division's 12th Infantry Brigade. His next assignment came on 10 February 1925 was as a General Staff Officer Grade 2 (GSO2) to the 55th (West Lancashire) Division, a Territorial Army (TA) formation, and then a GSO2 in Jamaica, before returning to the United Kingdom and being made Deputy Assistant Adjutant-General (DAAG) with Western Command. He was then posted to the 2nd Battalion, Lincolnshire Regiment, initially as the battalion's second-in-command. The battalion was serving in Palestine, then the scene of an Arab revolt. The battalion was in Palestine for five months before it was sent back to England, and in September 1937, Hansen became the commanding officer (CO). He continued to command the battalion until the outbreak of the Second World War in September 1939.

=== Second World War ===
On 2 September 1939, the day before the war began, Hansen was posted to the 55th (West Lancashire) Infantry Division, a TA formation which he had served with before, and was made Assistant Adjutant-General & Quartermaster-General (AA&QMG). He held this post until late January 1941, when he became Deputy Assistant & Quartermaster-General (DA&QMG) with XII Corps, then commanded by Lieutenant General Andrew Thorne. The corps, which was commanded from late April by Lieutenant General Bernard Montgomery, had responsibility for the defence of Kent in the event of a German invasion of the United Kingdom.

Hansen continued in this role until February 1942 when he was made an Area Commander of Belfast Area, prior to becoming a Sub-District Commander, Ashford Area until serving on the staff of Supreme Headquarters Allied Expeditionary Force (SHAEF). He remained in this position until the war's end in 1945, and he retired from the army in January 1946.

Hansen died on 12 February 1951, at the relatively young age of sixty. He is one of only fourteen men, other than Gurkhas born in Nepal, not born as a British subject to have received the Victoria Cross.

== Awards and decorations ==
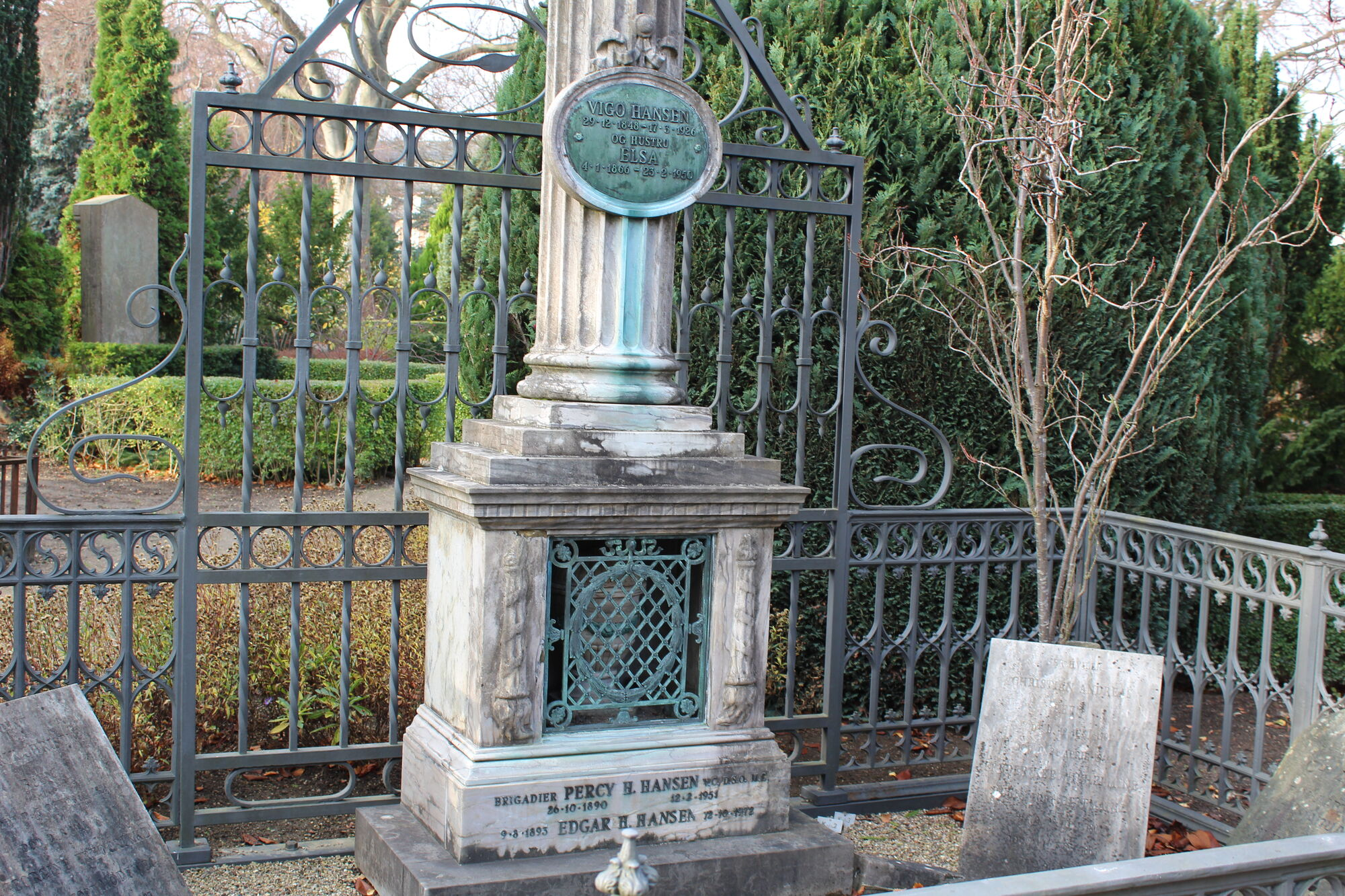
Hansen's tombstone at Copenhagen's Garrison Cemetery.

- Victoria Cross (1 October 1915) "For most conspicuous bravery on 9th August, 1915, at Yilghin Burnu, Gallipoli Peninsula. After the second capture of the "Green Knoll" his Battalion was forced to retire, leaving some wounded behind, owing to the intense heat from the scrub which had been set on fire. When the retirement was effected Captain Hansen, with three or four volunteers, on his own initiative, dashed forward several times some 300 to 400 yards over open ground into the scrub under a terrific fire, and succeeded in rescuing from inevitable death by burning, no less than six wounded men."
- Distinguished Service Order (16 September 1918) "For conspicuous gallantry and devotion to duty. He volunteered to carry out a reconnaissance, and brought back valuable information obtained under heavy artillery and machine-gun fire, which had been unprocurable from other sources. Throughout he did fine work."
- Military Cross (29 October 1915) "For conspicuous gallantry at Suvla Bay on 9th September, 1915. He made a reconnaissance of the coast, stripping himself and carrying only a revolver and a blanket for disguise. He swam and scrambled over rocks, which severely cut and bruised him, and obtained some valuable information and located a gun which was causing much damage. The undertaking was hazardous. On one occasion he met a patrol of 12 Turks who did not see him, and later a single Turk whom he lulled. He returned to our lines in a state of great exhaustion."
- Mentioned in dispatches five times
- Croix de Guerre with Bronze Star (France)
- Officer of the Legion of Merit (14 November 1947, United States)
- Commander of the Royal Order of St Olav (Norway)

== Birthplace and place of death controversy ==
There is disagreement concerning the places of Hansen's birth and death. Some sources state that he was born in Durban, South Africa; another says "Dresden, Germany (where his parents were taking a cure)". One source gives his place of death as "Kensington, London", and subsequent burial at Garrison Cemetery, Copenhagen, while another says he died in Copenhagen.

The Danish "folketælling 1895" (census) have him written in the papers when he was 4 years old. His birthplace is "Dresden". His mother "Else Hansen" and his father "Viggo Hansen" were born in Copenhagen. His father had a grocery store. Their house was on "Kongens Nytorv" (matrikel 34). (reference: Folketælling 1895, hovedliste, løbenummer 353, familie nr 98)

== Bibliography ==
- Snelling, Stephen (2012) [1995]. Gallipoli. VCs of the First World War. The History Press. ISBN 978-0752456539.
