= Anton Eduard Kieldrup =

Danish landscape painter

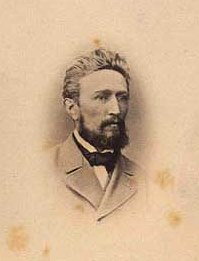
Anton Eduard Kieldrup (early 1860s)

Anton Eduard Kieldrup (16 February 1826, Haderslev – 22 May 1869, Copenhagen) was a Danish landscape painter.

== Biography ==
His father was a sailing master who later became the proprietor of a leasehold estate. His first art lessons were at a local school in Haderslev. From 1845 to 1847, with support from his family, he attended the Royal Danish Academy of Fine Arts where he decided to become a landscape painter.

His first exhibit was in 1847, followed by study trips to Norway, paid for by his fiancé's father. His first major showing came at the Charlottenborg Spring Exhibition in 1850 and consisted of Norwegian landscapes. In 1851 and 1852, he applied for financial support from the Academy, but was turned down for lack of experience. He returned to Norway in 1855, accompanied by his friend, the portrait painter Ole Balling, and was married in 1857. Of their nine children, only three survived to adulthood.

After a stay in Munich from 1858 to 1859, at his own expense, he exhibited landscapes which the Academy judged as promising and, finally, in 1863, was awarded a stipend for study travel. He visited Germany, Austria, Switzerland, France and the Low Countries. These trips, notably a lengthy stay in Düsseldorf, were later judged to have had an unfavorable effect on his work, as he became too focused on the prevailing popular fashions.

Upon returning home, that influence slowly wore off and his works became a more natural reflection of the Danish landscape, especially the forests and coastlines. Although he competed for the Neuhausenske Prize several times, he was not successful.

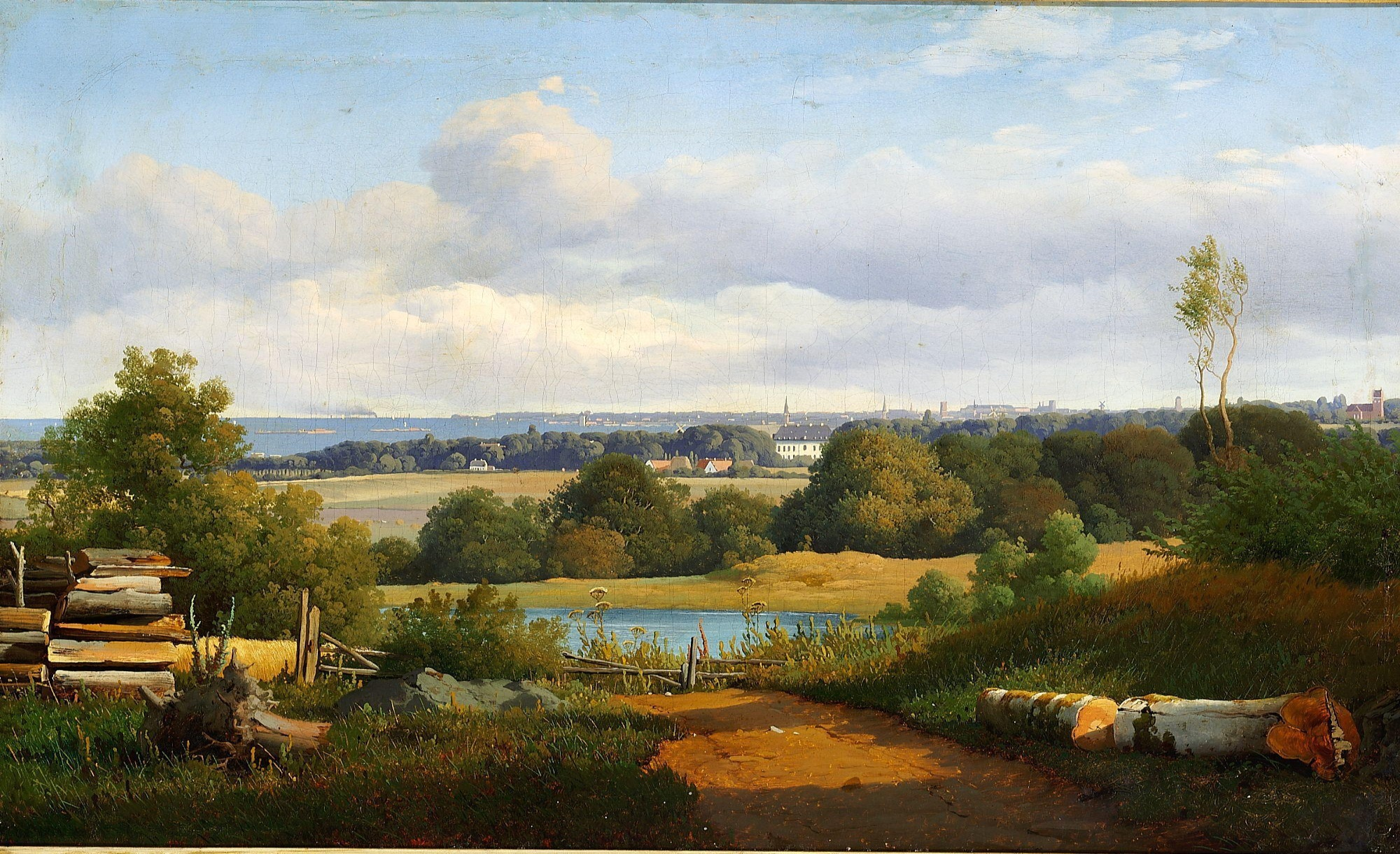
View of Copenhagen from Ermelunden.

Many of his relatives suffered from a "weak chest" and he had frequent periods of poor health. He died of unspecified causes at the age of forty-three and was buried at Garnisons Cemetery.
