= Evacuation of Fredericia =

- Part of the Second Schleswig War
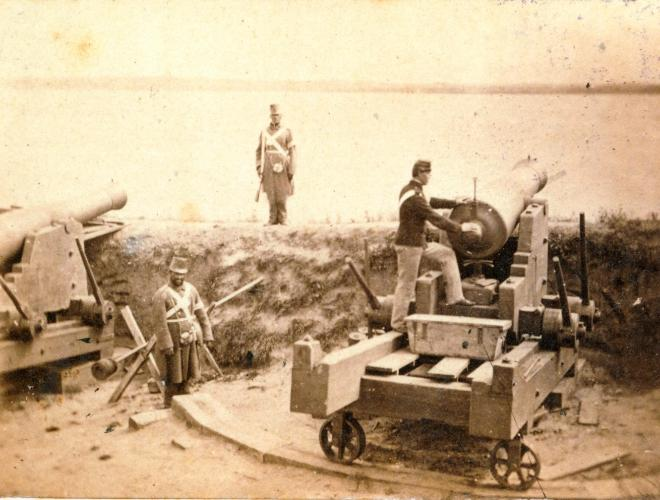
- Austrian soldiers inspecting the Fredericia fortress
Date	March 20, 1864 – April 28, 1864
Location	Fredericia, Fredericia Municipality, Denmark 55°34′N 9°45′E
Result	Austro-Prussian victory

Belligerents
Prussia; Austria	Denmark

Commanders and leaders
Friedrich Graf von Wrangel; Ludwig von Gablenz	Christian Lunding

The Evacuation of Fredericia was part of the Second Schleswig War and began on March 20, 1864, with a bombardment by Austrian and Prussian troops. The evacuation of the Fredericia fortress on April 28 effectively marked the end of Danish resistance in Jutland.

== Background ==
Following the Battle of Vejle (March 8, 1864), the Austrian II Corps, under the command of Lieutenant Field Marshal Ludwig von Gablenz, began setting up its batteries in front of the fortress on March 19. A day earlier, two brigades of the corps, those of Major General Tomas and Major General Leopold Count Gondrecourt, had advanced closer to Fredericia. Although they lacked a siege park, they considered the deployment of an 8-pounder battery quite effective. The Austrian 8-pounders were positioned near Erritsø and Jugelsang, the Prussian 6-pounders near Egum, and the 12-pounders near Christineborg, all within a radius of about half a mile. A Danish sortie was repulsed without difficulty. On March 20, the bombardment of the fortress began with a 42-gun barrage. The distance had been chosen so that the fortress's antiquated guns, which had a limited range, could barely return fire. The fortress barracks were soon engulfed in flames; the buildings (mostly wooden) were not particularly valuable, yet a great deal of material was lost. During the following day, the firing was halted, and Wrangel sent word to inquire whether Major General Lunding was prepared to surrender the fortress. It surprised hardly anyone when the reply arrived:

"...I find myself unable to respond to the proposals of His Excellency the Field Marshal."

Wrangel ordered another regrouping. However, no further bombardment took place because it had been determined that a siege park would be necessary, and therefore they wanted to wait until the end of the assault on the Dybbøl fortifications to then use the available equipment there. The Danish forces were not idle during this time. On Easter Monday, March 29th, they succeeded in ambushing Austrian Guard Hussars in the village of Assendrup.

== The evacuation ==
On April 18th, the Dybbøl fortifications fell. From there, the Austro-Prussian troops advanced further into Jutland to storm the last stronghold of Fredericia. The entire siege artillery was also slowly brought into position. However, the attack never materialized. During the night of April 27th-28th, the fortress was abandoned by its defenders. The commander, Major General Lunding, had managed to conceal his withdrawal. He allowed visible entrenchment work to continue. On the morning of April 28th, only Lieutenant Colonel Nielsen and a company of soldiers remained in the fortress. The last garrison left for Funen only during the night of April 28th-29th. The Austrians had already received news of the withdrawal from two deserters on April 28th. At first, it was believed to be a ruse, but as more and more citizens of the town confirmed the account, the troops entered the abandoned fortress on April 29th. First the Liechtenstein Hussars, then the Hessian Infantry, then the King of the Belgians Regiment, and finally Prussian Pioneers and Guard Artillery. Only poor people still lived in the houses outside the fortress. The town lay in ruins. In the citadel, 206 boarded-up cannons were found: 84-pounders, 48-pounders, mortars, and mortars. The conquerors immediately rebuilt the fortress facing the Little Belt. However, it can also be assumed that the abandonment of the fortress had something to do with hopes for diplomatic efforts: The London Conference began on April 25th. On May 3rd, the demolition of the Fredericia fortress began, and the magazines were blown up. Contrary to all the Danes' fears, there was no iconoclasm. Thus, the statue "The Brave Landsman" by sculptor Herman Wilhelm Bissen remained untouched and can still be viewed today.
