= Soffy Walleen =

Danish actress

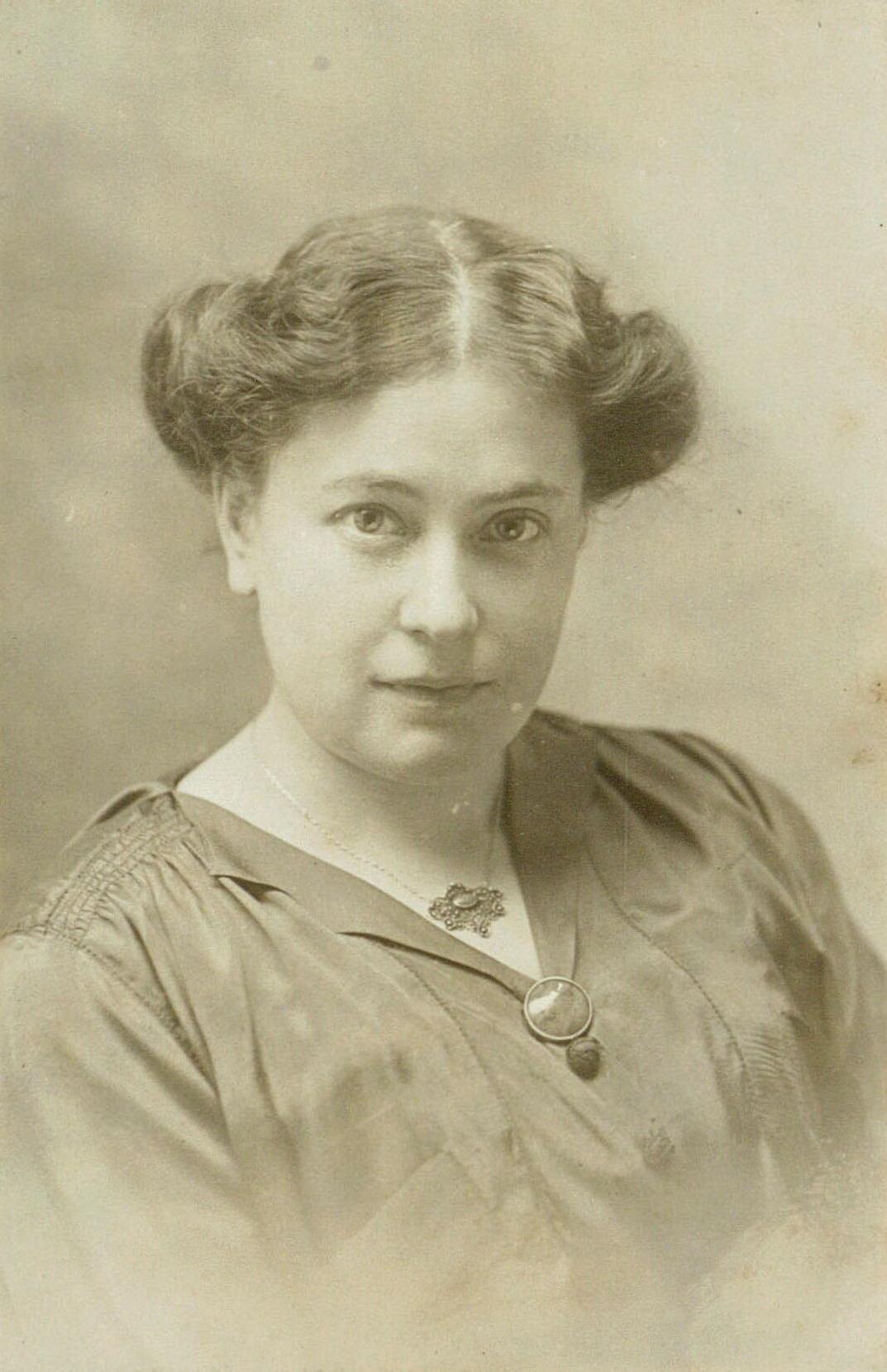
- Born: Sophie Christine Elizabeth Rosenberg; 15 May 1861; Spjellerup Parish, Karise, Denmark
- Died: 23 January 1940 (aged 78); Copenhagen, Denmark
- Occupation: Actress
- Years active: 1882 — 1910
- Spouse: Karl Mantzius
- Children: 1
- Parent(s): Carl Frederik Vilhelm Mathildus Rosenberg, Ane Lovise Plum

Sophie "Soffy" Christine Elisabeth Walleen née Rosenberg (1861–1940) was a Danish actress who made her début at the Royal Danish Theatre in 1882 as Antoinette in Édouard Pailleron's Gnisten (L'Étincelle). Gaining popularity thanks to her southern look with sparkling brown eyes and dark hair, she went on to perform in Copenhagen's independent theatres, including Folketeatret, Dagmarteatret and the Kasino before returning to the Royal in 1894. She later became a stage director and a talented instructor. In 1910, Soffy Walleen performed in Norsk Film's short silent film Magdelene.

== Biography ==
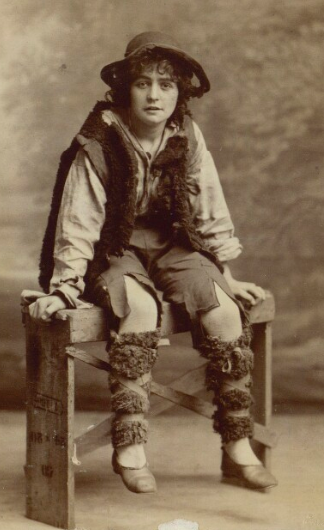
Soffy Walleen

Born in Spjellerup Parish near Karise on 15 May 1861, Sophie Christine Elisabeth Rosenberg was the daughter of the literature historian Carl Frederik Vilhelm Mathildus Rosenberg (1829–1885) and his wife Ane Lovise née Plum (1833–1874). In June 1894, she married the actor and theatre director Karl Mantzius (1860–1921). They had one child together, Else Louise (1897). The marriage was dissolved in 1902. That year she married the Swedish writer Carl Alphonse Walleen-Bornemann (1863–1943).

Soffy Rosenberg made her debut at the Royal Danish Theatre on 9 November 1882 as Antoinette in Pailleron's one-act play Gnisten. After her marriage in 1884, she performed in the private theatres of Copenhagen, especially the Folketeater and, from 1889 to 1894, the Dagmarteater, where she gained a measure of success in Franz Grillparzer's Jødinden fra Toledo. It was however in contemporary works that she was most competent, for example as the seamstress in Emma Gad's Et Sølvbryllup (1890), a role she played repeatedly over the years. She performed equally well as Madam Jensen in Karl Larsen's Kvinder. She went on to play the whimsical Aunt Two in Gustav Wied's Skærmydsler.

She later became a stage director and a talented instructor. In 1910, Soffy Walleen performed in Norsk Film's short silent film Magdelene.

Soffy Walleen died in Copenhagen on 23 January 1940 and was buried in Garrison Cemetery, Copenhagen.
