= Nanna Liebmann =

Danish composer

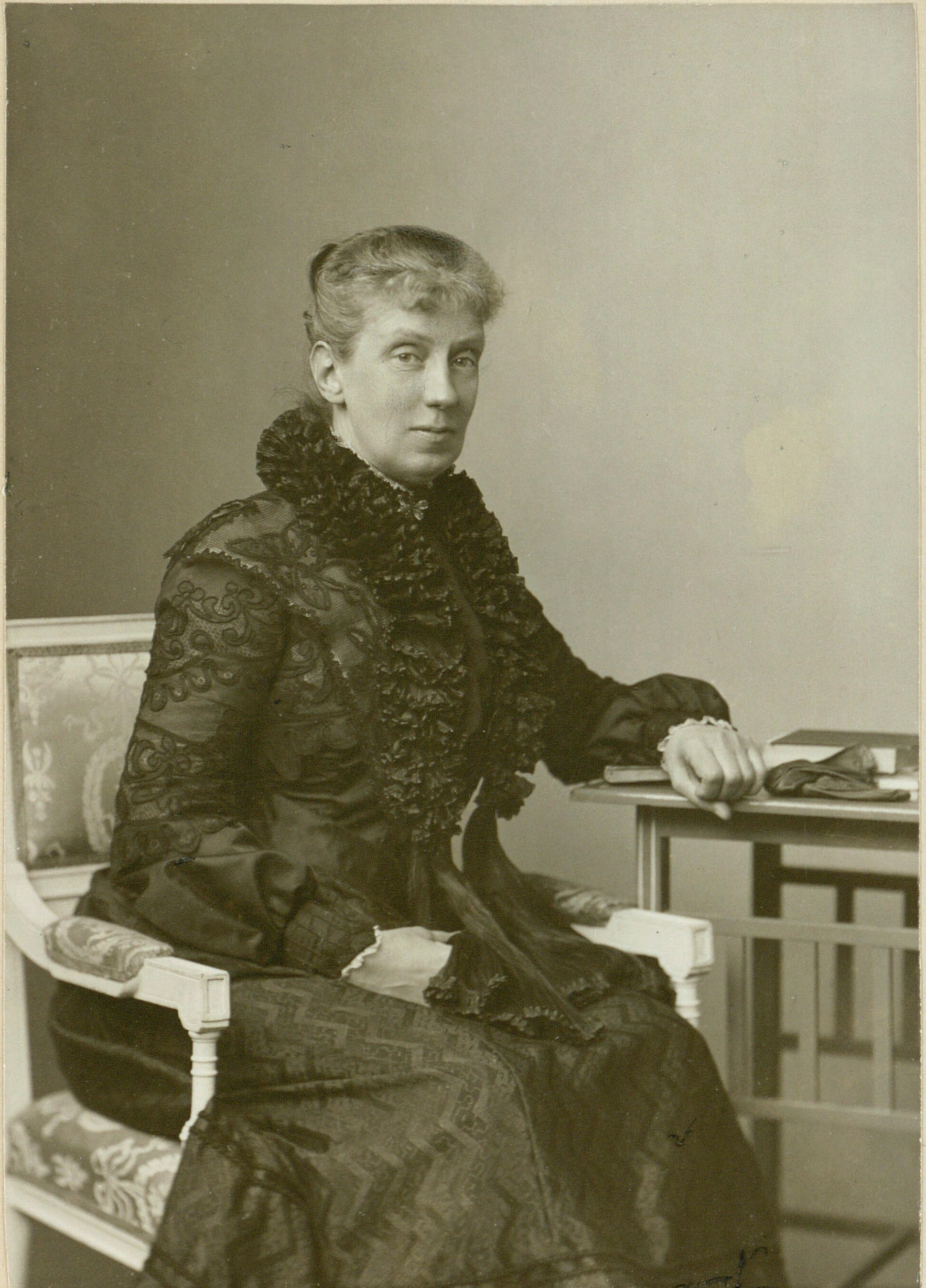

Nanna Magdalene Liebmann, née Lehmann, (September 27, 1849 – May 11, 1935) was a Danish, music educator, music critic, concert promoter and composer.

== Early life ==
Nanna Lehmann was one of nine children born to a socially active family; her brother Carl Lehmann became a politician, another brother Edvard Lehmann became a religious historian, her sister Signe Lehmann also became a musician, and her uncle was the politician Orla Lehmann. She was a cousin of the literary critic and women's suffrage advocate Margrethe Vullum.

== Career ==
She studied at the Royal Danish Academy of Music with Victor Bendix, Johann Christian Gebauer, J.P.E. Hartmann, Niels W. Gade, August Winding and Carl Helsted. At the conservatory she met composer Axel Liebmann, whom she married in 1874. He died soon afterward and she turned to composing and teaching music to support herself and her son, Poul Liebmann. Most of her compositions are written between 1869 and 1914, and she wrote reviews for Dannebrog.

Liebmann and her husband were both buried in Garrison Cemetery, Copenhagen.

== Notable works ==
Selected works include:

- Syv sange til tyske tekster 1885
- Syv sange 1885
- Minnelieder 1903
- Fem sange 1904
- Thema med Variationer (klaver 1910)
- Thème passioneè (klaver 1910)
- Théme passionné et Variations (1911)
- Intermezzo i h-mol (klaver 1911)
- Vals i D (klaver 1912)
- Preludium i a-mol (klaver 1912)

== See also ==
- List of Danish composers
