= Axel Liebmann =

Danish composer

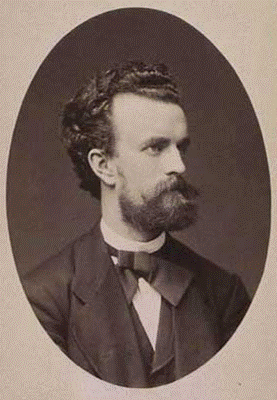

Axel Liebmann (3 August 1849 – 23 January 1876) was a Danish composer. With Victor Bendix, he founded the choral group Korforeningen in 1872 and conducted it from its founding to his death 1876.

== Personal life ==
Liebmann was married to pianist and singer Nanna Lehmann (1849–1935).

== See also ==
- List of Danish composers
