= Battle of Fredericia =

Battle Between Schleswig Holstein and Denmark

Coordinates: 55°34′03″N 9°45′12″E

- Part of the First Schleswig War
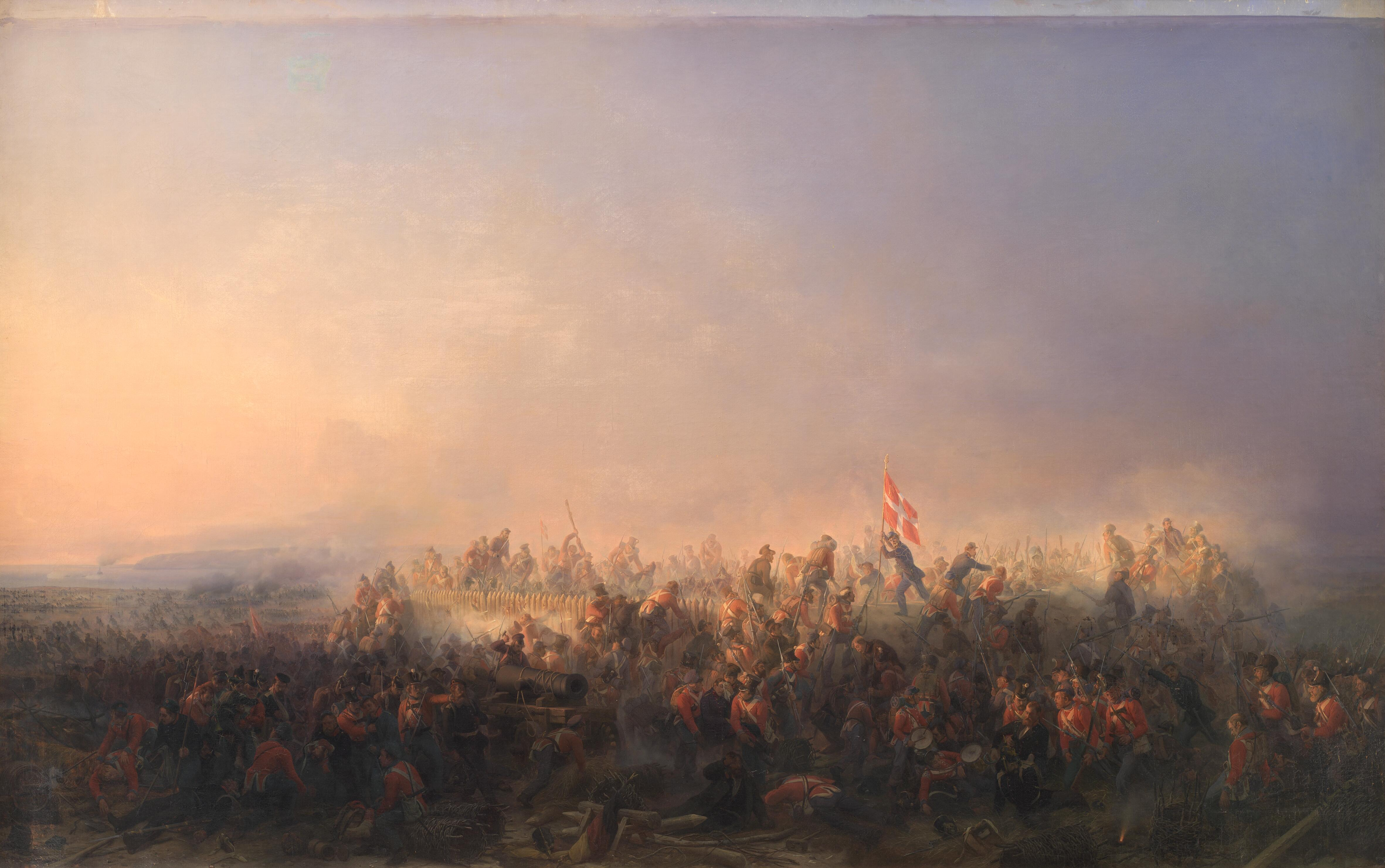
- The Battle of Fredericia by Niels Simonsen
Date	6 July 1849
Location	Fredericia, Denmark
Result	Danish victory

Belligerents
Schleswig-Holstein	Denmark

Commanders and leaders
Eduard von Bonin	(Denmark) Christian de Meza (Denmark) Olaf Rye † (Denmark) Christian Lunding

Strength
16,000	24,000

Casualties and losses
203 killed 1,134 wounded 1,658 captured Total: 2,995	512 killed 1,344 wounded 36 captured Total: 1,892

The Battle of Fredericia was fought between soldiers of Schleswig-Holstein and Denmark on 6 July 1849 at Fredericia in Denmark. The battle was part of the First Schleswig War, which was a conflict between Schleswig-Holstein, supported by several German states, and Denmark. The Danes won the battle.

== Background ==
In 1849, Danish southern Jutland was invaded by 16,000 Schleswig-Holsteinian and German troops, and Danish troops located there withdrew to northern Jutland. As they withdrew, the Danes left 7,000 men to garrison their fortified town of Fredericia, along with a reserve on the island of Funen. Generalleutnant Karl von Prittwitz a Prussian commander, ordered the Schleswig-Holsteinian army to besiege the town and the siege began on 9 May under the command of General Eduard von Bonin, whilst the Danish garrison was led by Colonel Lunding.

== Prelude ==
The Schleswig-Holsteinians constructed 4 redoubts, which would bombard the town and cover them from a Danish sally. Trying to prevent the construction of the third redoubt, the garrison sallied on 13 May but the third redoubt was completed by 15 May. From 16 to 20 May, Fredericia was shelled. Most of the population was moved to Funen, and four of the most densely built areas of the town were destroyed by fire. Unable to see into the town, and judging by the fact that the fires were put out quickly, Bonin believed that the damage was not significant.

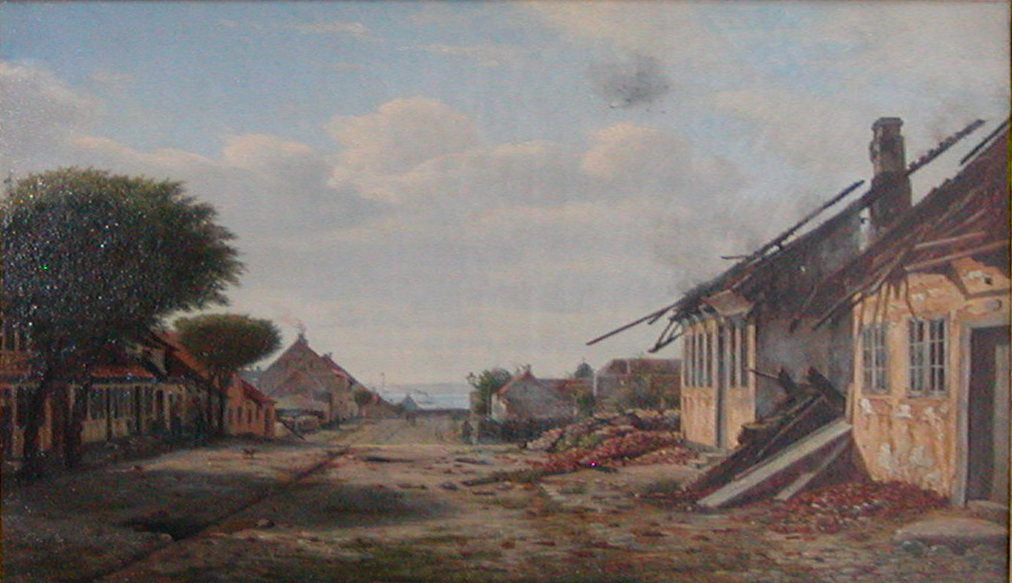
Fredericia under siege, by C.O Zeuthen

The Schleswig-Holsteinians had not completely cut off the town, and the garrison was able to be relieved several times by troops based in Funen, so Bonin decided to cut off access between the two Danish areas. As a result, he ordered two more redoubts to be constructed, of which one was completed, near the beach between Funen and Fredericia. On 30 May, Danish troops launched another sally, damaging what had been constructed so far, and spiking 9 cannons. The Schleswig-Holsteinians were not able to completely cut off the town, but the threat that that could still happen prompted Lunding to urge his superiors to launch an attack soon.

Danish commanders agreed that a major attack would be made north of the town, with General Olaf Rye's 5th Brigade tasked with taking the strongest redoubt, the Treldeskansen; whilst diversionary landings by two fleets each of 22 ships (each had 1 steamer, 4 gunboats, 5 transports and 12 sailing ships) would be launched north and south of Fredericia to draw away enemy troops. The battle was ordered to begin on 5 July but a delay in one of the brigades receiving their orders led to the battle being postponed until the next day. The Schleswig-Holsteinians had expected an attack to occur on 5 July, and its army had been waiting in earthworks all of that day. As the Danish troops deployed for the attack in the first hour of 6 July, the Schleswig-Holsteinian troops were sleeping in their camps. A dense fog shrouded the Danish soldiers as they moved, and straw placed over the streets and the noise of the wind reduced the sound they were making as they traversed through Fredericia, resulting in their deployment not being detected.

== Battle ==
The battle began at 01:00 on 6 July, with Bonin's view of the battle obscured by darkness. The third and fourth Schleswig-Holsteinian redoubts, as well as a nearby mortar battery, were attacked by General De Meza's 'Avantgarden' (Vanguard) detachment. The fourth redoubt was taken, as well as the battery, and Danish engineers worked to destroy what had been captured. The third redoubt, defended by a part of the 4th Jaegerkorps under the command of Major Schmidt, was able to repulse the Danish attack.

Meanwhile, Olaf Rye had ordered 2 of his 5 battalions to bypass the Treldeskansen (the fifth redoubt) so that they could block Schleswig-Holsteinian reinforcements from reaching it, whilst the remaining battalions of his brigade attacked the redoubt, supported by the batteries 'Marcussen' and 'Meincke'. Rye, wanting to move forward to observe the assault better, rode on a horse towards the redoubt. Riding unescorted, his horse was killed, and he went by foot to the 'Marcussen' battery where he got another one. Riding north of the Treldeskansen with a company from the 4th Reserve Battalion, his new horse was shot. Around 03:00, as he was leading his men from the front as he always did, he was shot in the thigh and in the lower abdomen, and died from his wounds a short time after.

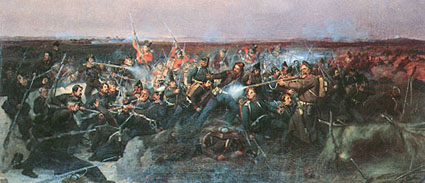
The fight for Treldeskansen, unknown artist

The fighting at the Treldeskansen had turned into a stalemate, but the reinforcement of the Danish troops with the 8th Battalion from Moltke's Brigade and the half-battery 'Tillisch' led to the capture of the redoubt, along with 300 prisoners, by 04:00. Major Stuckradt, commander of the Schleswig-Holsteinian 1st Brigade, which was located on Bonin's left flank, initially decided to withdraw his forces to Egeskov via Rands Fjord, but after being informed that Danish gunboats were guarding the fjord he ordered that his formation move towards Bredstrup.

With the 6th Battalion from the west, the 8th Battalion from the north, and a company of the 7th Battalion from the second redoubt, the Schleswig-Holsteins counter-attacked, causing the Danish 2nd Lette (Light) Battalion and 2nd Jaegerkorps to retreat, and the attempt to destroy captured Schleswig-Holsteinian equipment stopped. Bonin ordered his last reserve, the 8th Battalion, to press the attack. The Danish Schleppegrells Brigade counter-attacked against the battalion. The first Danish attack against the battalion was repulsed, and whilst they were preparing to launch another one, the sun rose and allowed Bonin to see that the Schleswig-Holsteinian 1st Brigade was retreating. This caused him to order a general retreat to Stoutrup, and the Danish troops began to pursue.

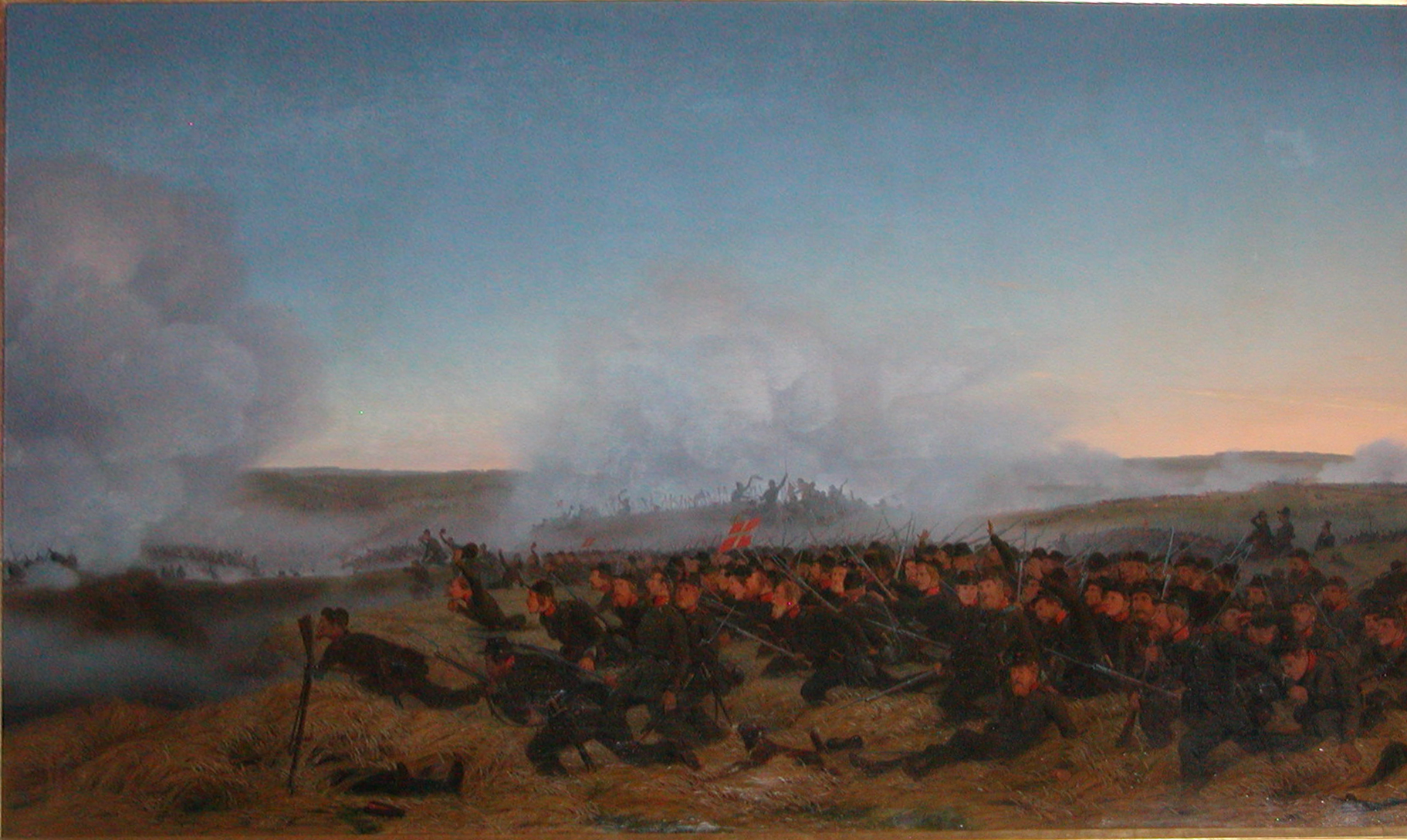
Battle of Fredericia, unknown artist

De Meza followed the retreating Schleswig-Holsteins with the Danish advance guard towards Egum and Stallerup, and blocked the withdrawal of the 1st Brigade, capturing 750 prisoners as a result. The left wing of the Schleswig-Holsteinian army was heavily battered, and the area between the town and Rands Fjord was now free from Schleswig-Holsteinian troops. Meanwhile, the Schleppegrells Brigade, supported by 2 companies from the 6th Reserve Battalion, captured the first and second redoubts. In an effort to cover the retreat, the Schleswig-Holsteinian right wing attempted to fight the Danish troops at Stoutrup with two battalions, but they were forced to withdraw from the settlement by the Danish 3rd Jaegerkorps of the 3rd Battalion. To the east of Stoutrup, the Schleswig-Holsteinian artillery park was located, with 100 wagons, a couple of guns and thousands of cannonballs and grenades captured. By 09:00, the main fighting had ended.

== Aftermath ==
The Danes halted their pursuit at a ravine west of Fredericia. They had sustained 1,892 dead, wounded, and unwounded captured soldiers; whilst Schleswig-Holstein had suffered 2,995. Despite being outnumbered over 2:1 and sustaining about 500 more dead and wounded, Denmark achieved a victory over Schleswig-Holstein. As a result of the battle, a cease-fire was implemented between the combatants in the First Schleswig War, and all German troops had left Denmark by 25 August. The fighting between Danish and German troops would resume about a year later, when 27,000 Germans and 37,000 Danes troops engaged in the Battle of Isted on 24 and 25 July 1850.'

== See also ==
- Siege of Fredriksodde – 1657 Dano-Swedish War siege
