= Battle of Vejle =

- Part of the Second Schleswig War
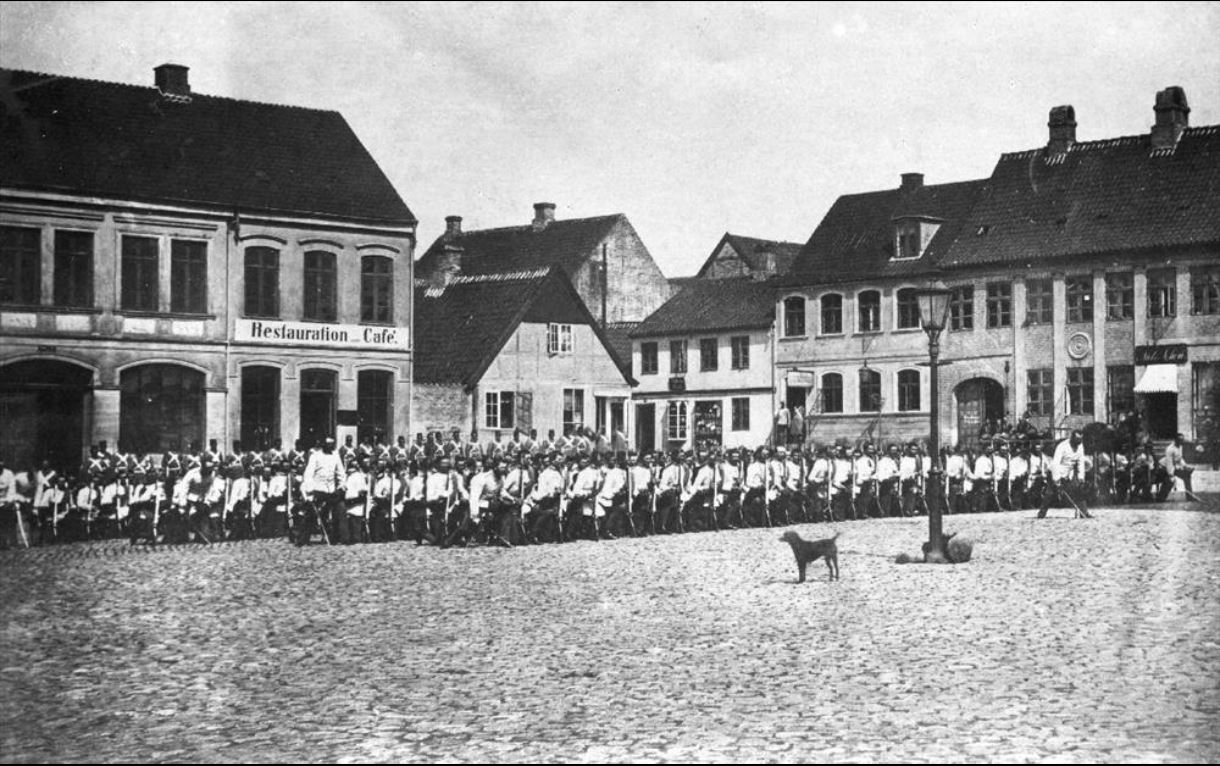
- Austrian troops lining up on Vejle market square, probably for a field service.
Date	March 8, 1864
Location	Vejle, Vejle Municipality, Denmark 55°43′N 9°32′E
Result	Austrian victory

Belligerents
Austria	Denmark

Commanders and leaders
Ludwig von Gablenz	Cai Hegermann-Lindencrone

Strength
4,000 Infantry	7,000 Infantry

Casualties and losses
92 killed	167 killed and wounded, 150 captured

The Battle of Vejle was a battle of the Second Schleswig War that occurred on March 8, 1864, between the Austrian Empire and Denmark at and in the town of Vejle. The Austrians won the battle and their victory opened the way for the Evacuation of Fredericia and the Battle of Jasmund.
