= Christian Lunding =

Danish military officer (1795–1871)

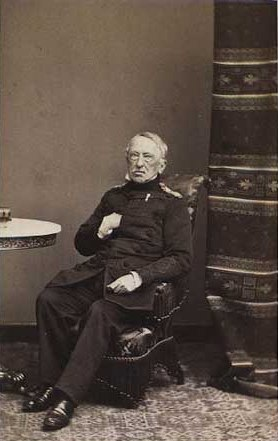
- Lunding in 1871
- Born: 19 February 1795; Copenhagen, Copenhagen Municipality, Denmark-Norway
- Died: 26 July 1871 (aged 76); Frederiksberg, Frederiksberg Municipality, Denmark
- Spouse: Jutta Mangor (m. 1833–1871)
- Military career
- Allegiance: Denmark-Norway; Denmark
- Branch: Royal Dano-Norwegian Army; Royal Danish Army
- Service years: 1810–1844; 1848–1867
- Rank: Lieutenant general
- Conflicts: First Schleswig War: Battle of Schleswig; Battle of Nybøl; Battle of Dybbøl; Second Schleswig War: Evacuation of Fredericia

Niels Christian Lunding (19 February 1795 – 26 July 1871) was a Danish officer who was known for ordering the Evacuation of Fredericia of the Second Schleswig War as well as being the brother of Conrad Mathias Lunding and Vilhelm Lunding.

== Biography ==
Lunding began as a free corporal in 1808 and in 1810 became a second lieutenant in the Zealand Life Regiment before being transferred to the Ingeniørkorpset in 1812. From 1815 to 1840, he was employed by the Corps' Building and Fortress Service, partly in Holstein, partly in Copenhagen, as in 1820 he was promoted to first lieutenant. In 1829, he was promoted to staff captain, 1834 to real captain and in 1841, was promoted to Major.

In 1842, he was appointed head of the 1st engineering company, but when he was appointed major in 1844, he resigned to return in construction service in the 2nd district. In 1848, he was a fortress engineer for Copenhagen and led the execution of various defense works. Shortly after the outbreak of the war, however, he became commander of the Field Engineer Detachment and took part in the Battle of Schleswig and in the battles of Nybøl and Dybbøl, after which he was given the rank of lieutenant colonel. In 1846, he became a Knight of Dannebrog and in 1848, was awarded the Dannebrogordenens Hæderstegn.

=== First Schleswig War ===
In the winter of 1848–49, he was entrusted with various design works concerning Jutland's defense, of which Fredericia's fortress formed an important part, and despite a lack of manpower and funds, he increased his defensive ability to such an extent that the Ministry of War decided to keep him garrisoned there. When the war broke out again, Lunding was appointed commander on 8 April.

With his great knowledge of the fortress, his ability to work with resourcefulness and great energy, he was deemed the right man for the job. Not only did he resist the siege of the insurgents despite the odds, but prepared the outcome on 6 July by careful measures. As a reward, he received the Commander's Cross from Dannebrog, just as he soon after he was promoted to colonel.

In 1852, Lunding was employed as a conducting staff officer at the Fortress Service in the 1st General Command and the following year in the same position in Holstein. Two years later he returned as interim commander in Kastellet, but resigned in 1856 from Ingeniørkorpset and became commander at Kronborg, being given the rank of major general.

=== Evacuation of Fredericia ===
At the imminent prospect of war in December 1863, he was asked to take over the fort again as commander in Fredericia, to which he was immediately ready, although the fortress, despite the works used thereon, was still in poor condition at the time. After arriving there, he urged the council to abandon it, but the ministry rejected this.

It ordered him to relentlessly put the fortress on the defensive, and he then seized upon the old zeal and tenacity, so that when the Prussians and Austrians in March appeared outside its ramparts, it was able to endure a siege. However, there wasn't an actual siege as the Prussians and Austrians confined themselves to a bombardment, and Lunding then easily had to reject General Ludwig von Gablenz's subsequent call for surrender.

During the ensuing containment, Lunding worked hard on the fortification of the fortress, as well as having several sorties and raids to harass the Germans. After Dybbøl's fall on 18 April, however, the government decided to evacuate Fredericia, and Lunding received the order to do so on the 26th of the same month, which was such a hard blow for him that he relinquished command and had someone else lead the escape.

=== Later years ===
Lunding, who in March was promoted to lieutenant general and after the war ended, returned to Kronborg and was pardoned in 1867 with the Grand Cross of Dannebrog. That same year he resigned as commander and was put à la suite in the army, while the Reichstag that same winter granted him a special pension in recognition of his merits of the fatherland. One of his closest friends has described him as a complex character, a mixture of gentleness and severity. Lunding was also remembered as a man who defended Fredericia not once but twice.

== Legacy ==
A memorial to Lunding at Denmark's bastion in Fredericia was unveiled on 6 July 1899, with a bust by Andreas Paulsen.

There are two colored drawings approx. 1815 and 1820 with a Portrait painting by FC Lund and posthumous painting by August Jerndorff 1892 at the Frederiksborg Museum, reproduced in xylography by Hans Peter Hansen the same year. There was also a xylograph on 1871 by Carl Wilhelm Roikjer.
