= Nossentiner/Schwinzer Heath Nature Park =

Nature park in Mecklenburg-Vorpommern, Germany

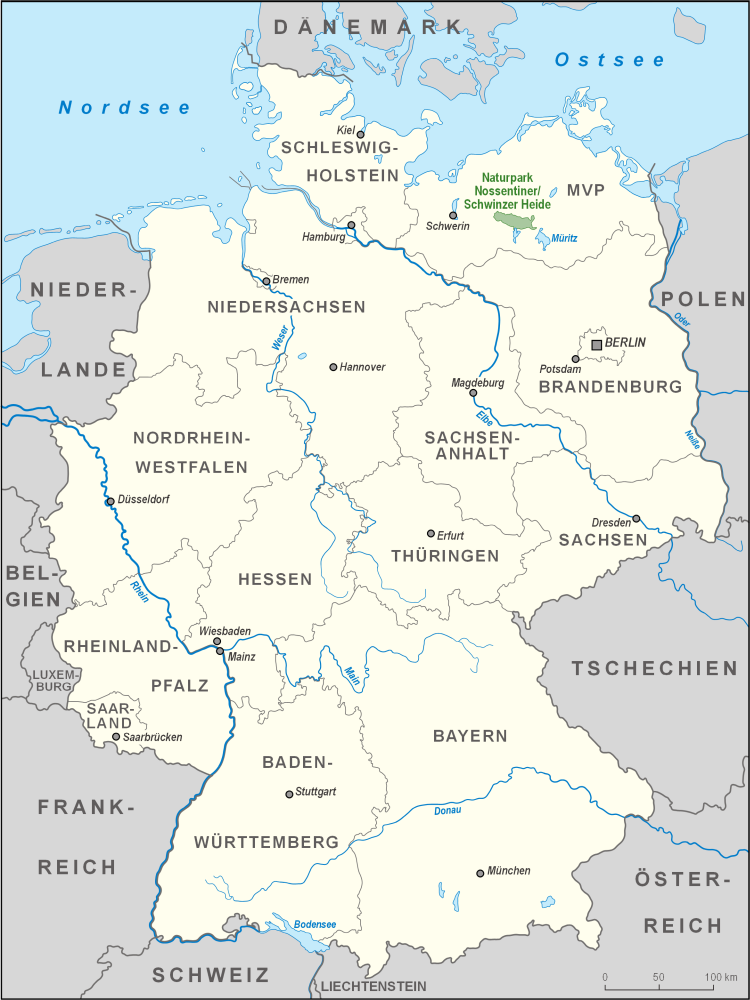
Location

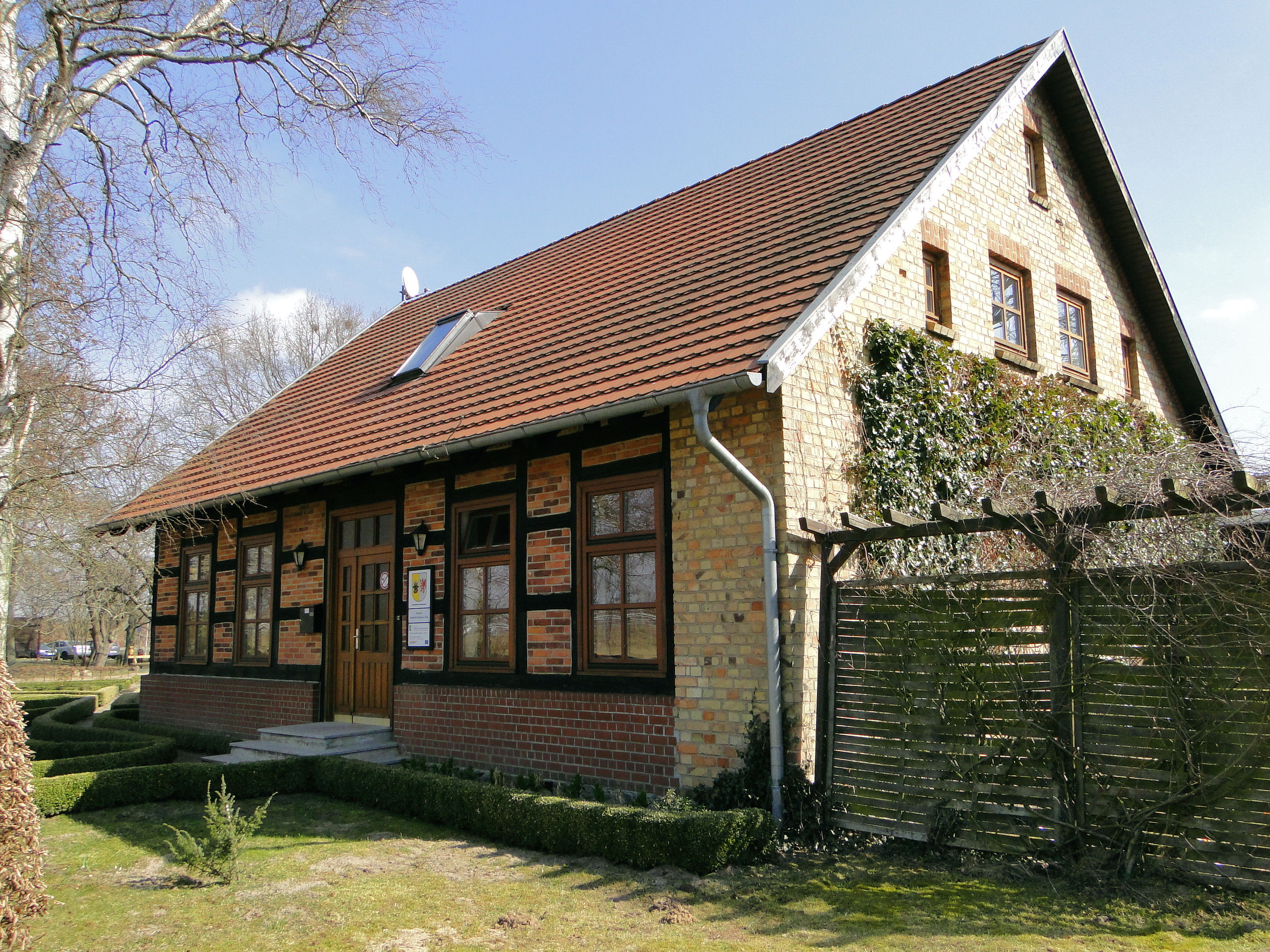
Park management in Karow

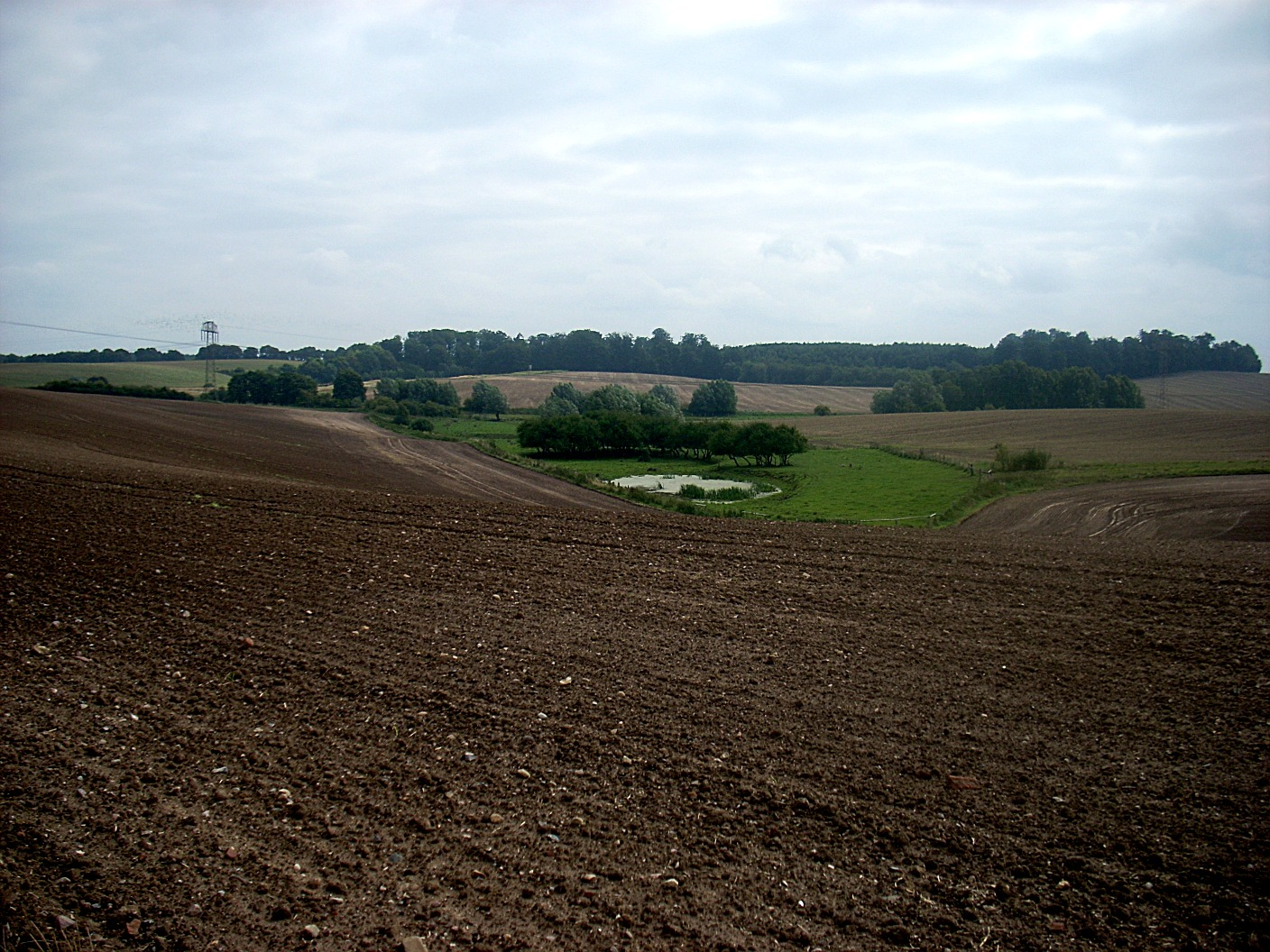
Landscape near Lohmen

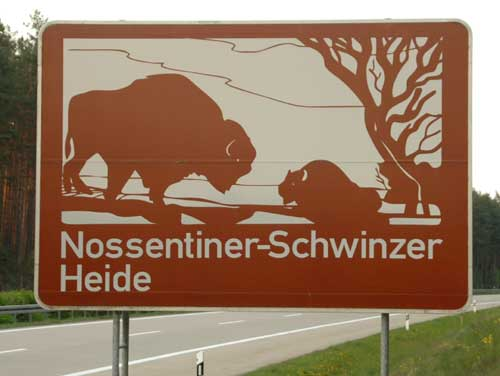
Tourist sign on the A 19

The Nossentiner/Schwinzer Heath Nature Park (German: Naturpark Nossentiner/Schwinzer Heide) lies in the western part of the Mecklenburg Lake District in the districts of Mecklenburgische Seenplatte, Rostock and Ludwigslust-Parchim in the north German state of Mecklenburg-Vorpommern. It lies between the towns of Plau am See, Goldberg, Krakow am See and Malchow. It was founded in 1990 and finally confirmed in the state act of 1994. The total area of the nature park is 365 km^{2} of which 60% is wooded, about 14% consists of rivers and lakes and the remainder is cultural landscape. There are almost 60 lakes in the nature park and the rivers Nebel and Mildenitz. Special features of the nature park are the sandar - sand and gravel deposits left by the ice age. Numerous bogs are also dotted across the countryside. The nature park is a breeding ground for white-tailed eagle, osprey und bittern. In addition, wisent are bred on the Damerower Werder. The nature park is easily accessed from the Malchow junction on the A 19 motorway. In the vicinity of the nature park is the Dobbertin Abbey. To the north is the Mecklenburg Switzerland and Lake Kummerow Nature Park and to the northwest the Sternberg Lake District Nature Park.

== See also ==
- List of nature parks in Germany
