= Altmühl Valley Nature Park =

Nature park in Bavaria, Germany

Altmühl Valley Nature Park (Naturpark Altmühltal)
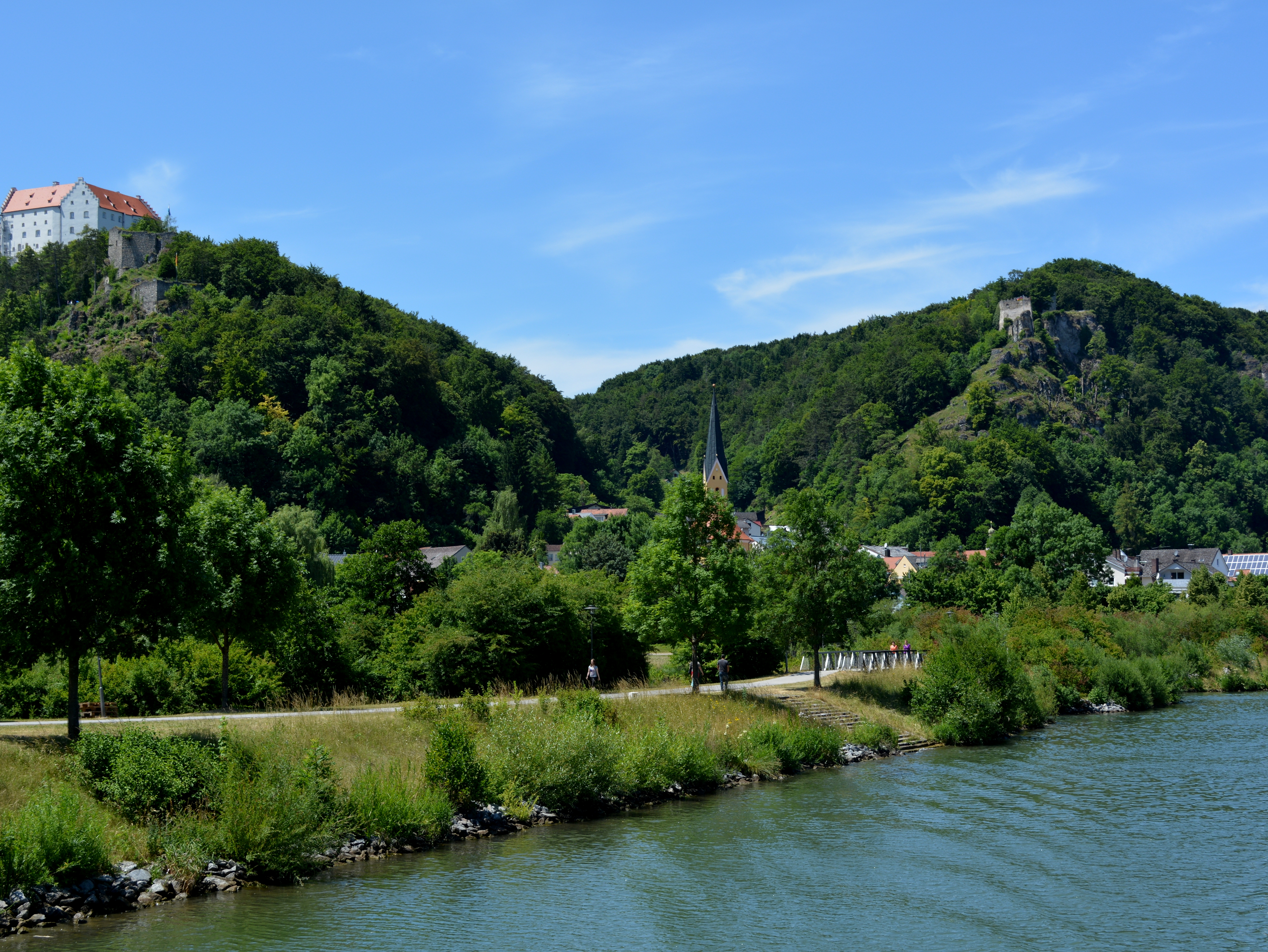
- Rosenburg in Altmühltal

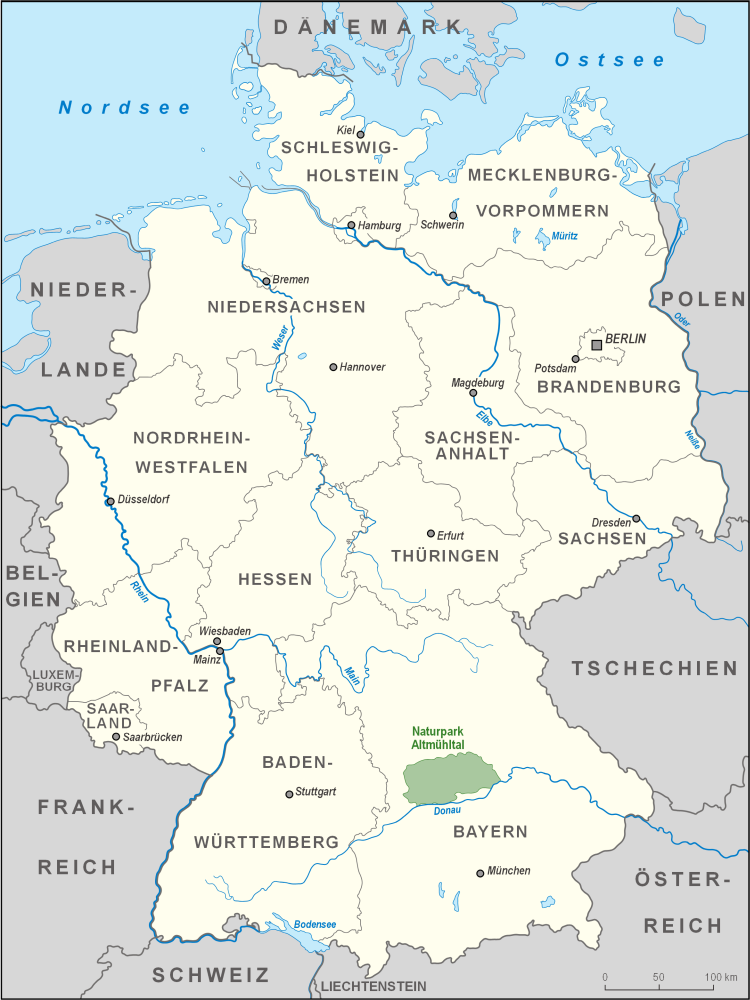
- Map
- Location: Franconian Jura
- Coordinates: 48°49′04″N 11°13′37″E
- Area: 2,962 km^{2} (1,144 sq mi)
- Designation: NP-00016
- Established: 1969

The Altmühl Valley Nature Park (German: Naturpark Altmühltal) is a nature park, 2,962 km^{2} in area, in the south German state of Bavaria. The area of the park is almost coextensive with that of the natural region major unit of the Southern Franconian Jura (Südliche Frankenalb). It lies immediately north of the city of Ingolstadt on the River Danube and is divided into a southern and northern Altmühl Valley.

== Description ==
The nature park was established on 25 July 1969 in Pappenheim by society formed for the purpose, the Naturpark Altmühltal (Südliche Frankenalb) ("Altmühl Valley Nature Park (Southern Franconian Jura)"). It is the fourth largest nature park in Germany after the Central/North Black Forest Nature Park, Bergstraße-Odenwald Nature Park and Southern Black Forest Nature Park.

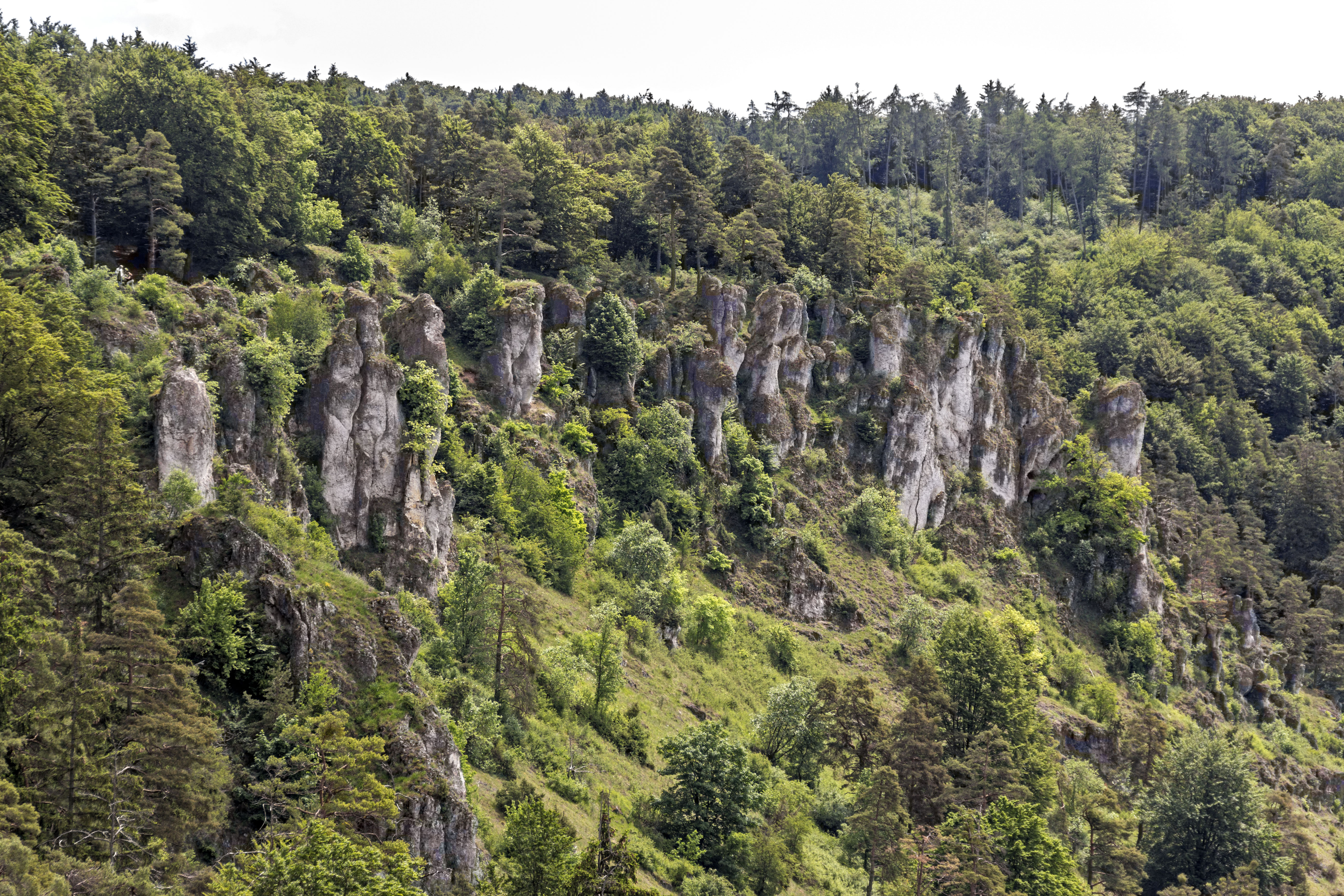
Arnsberger Leite

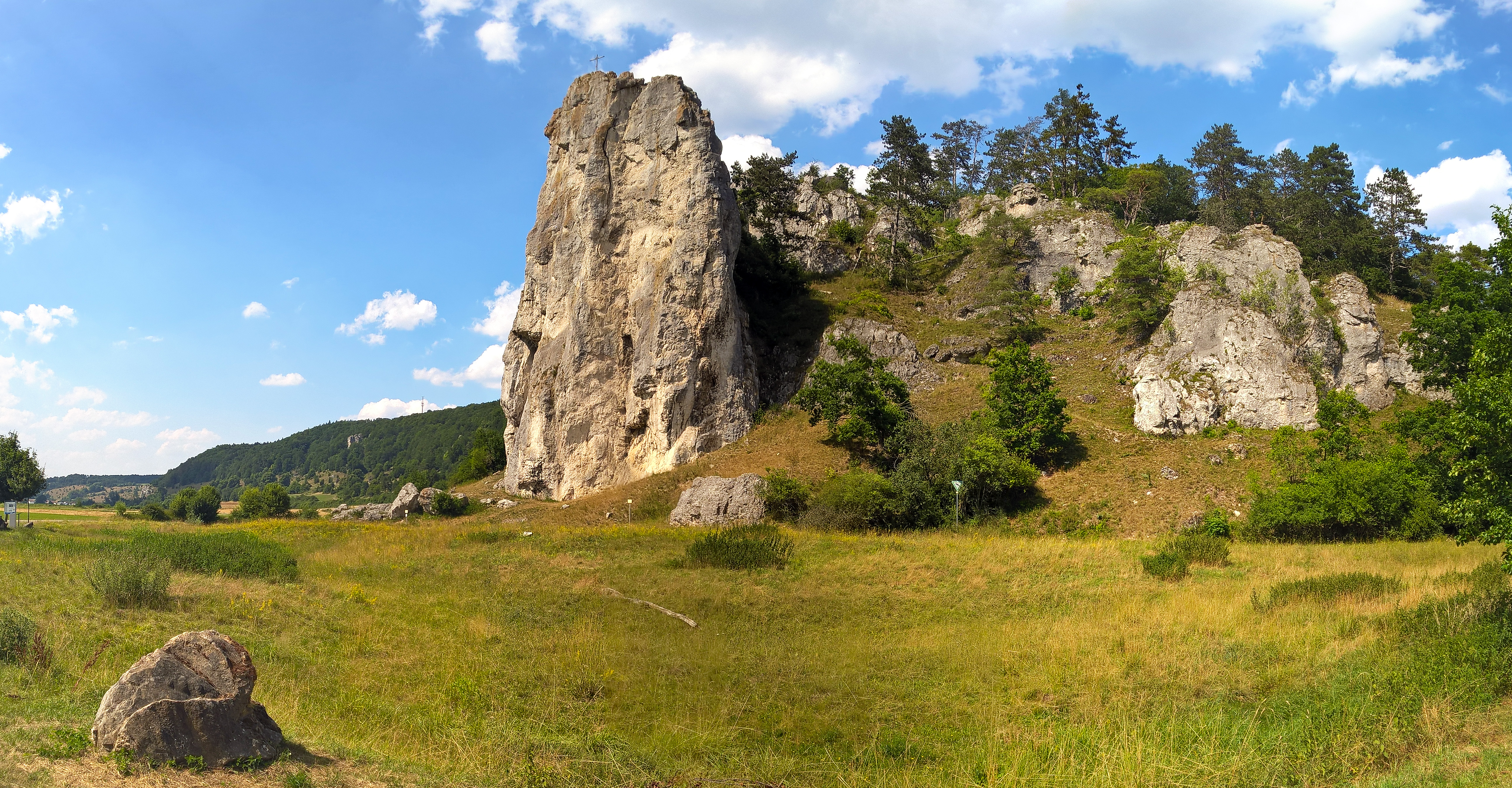
Burgstein

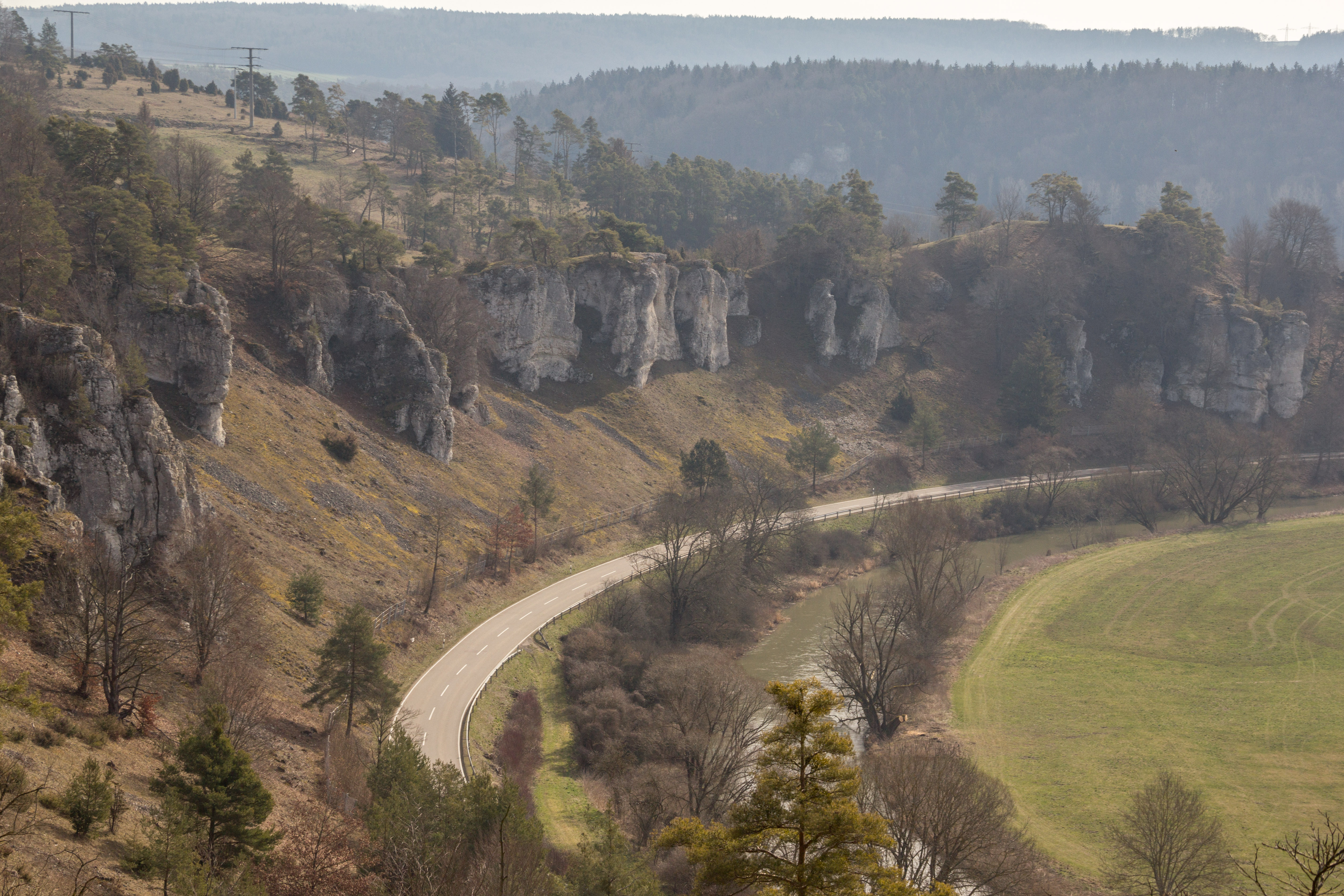
Zwölf Apostel

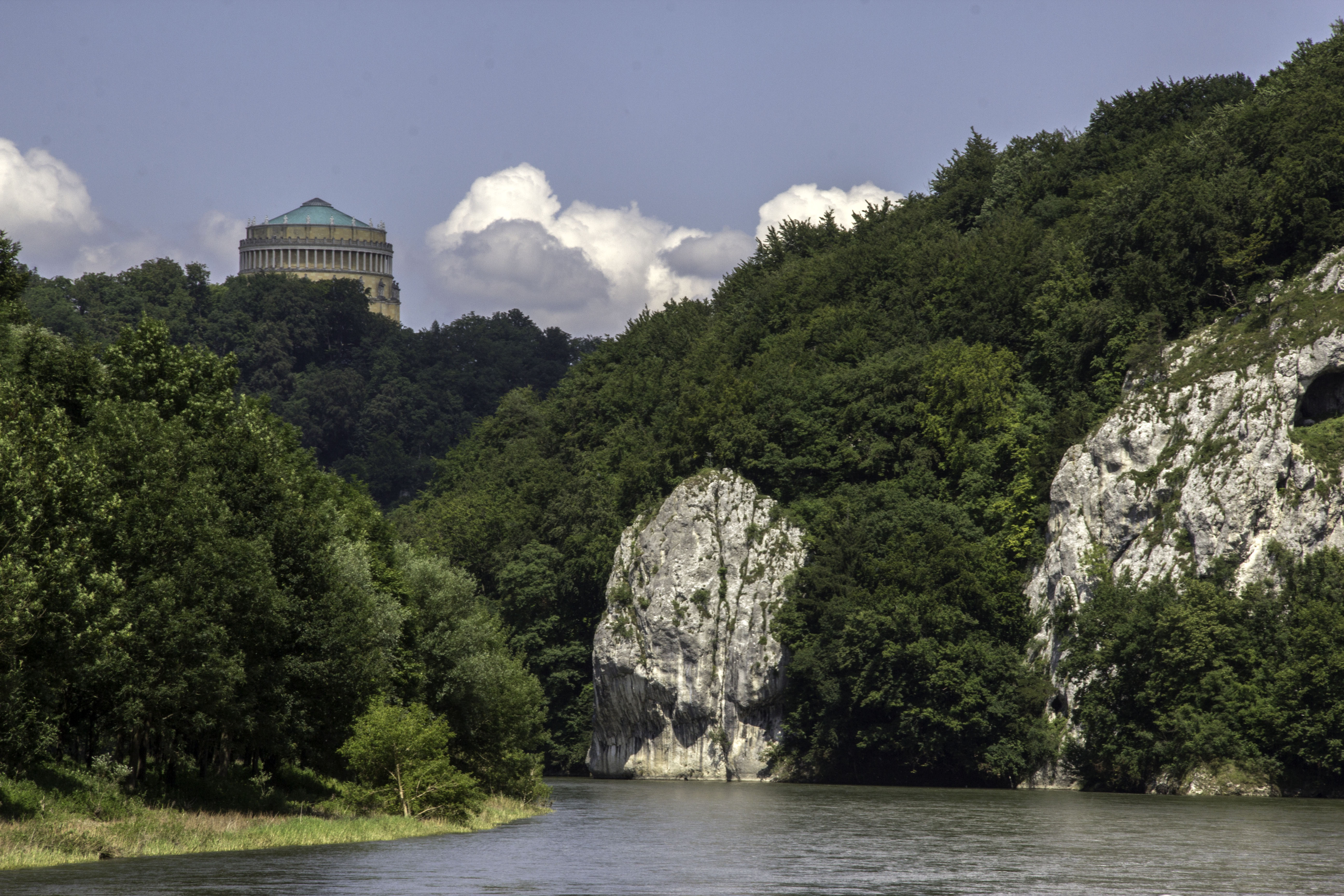
Weltenburger Enge

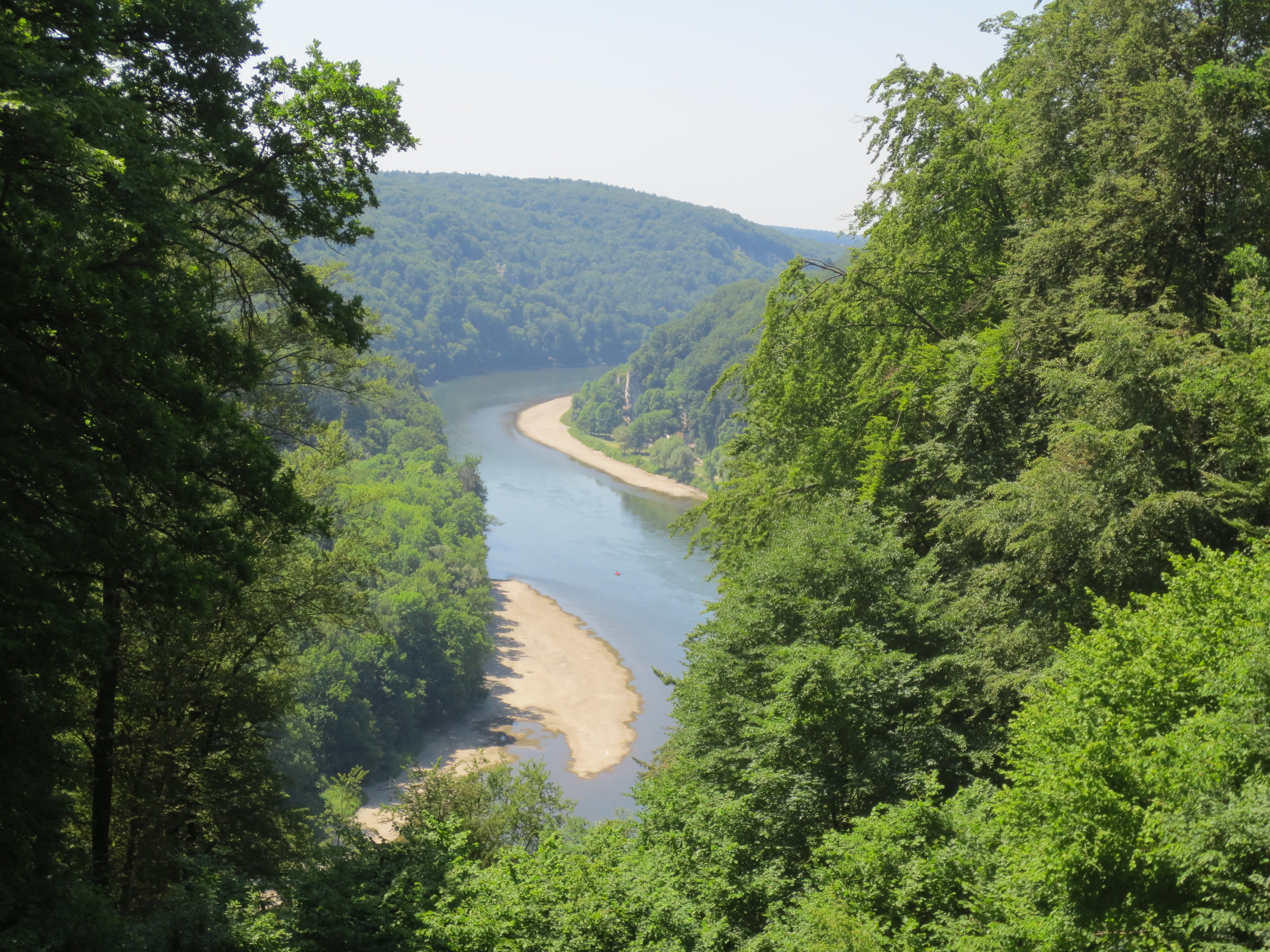
Danube at Weltenburger Enge

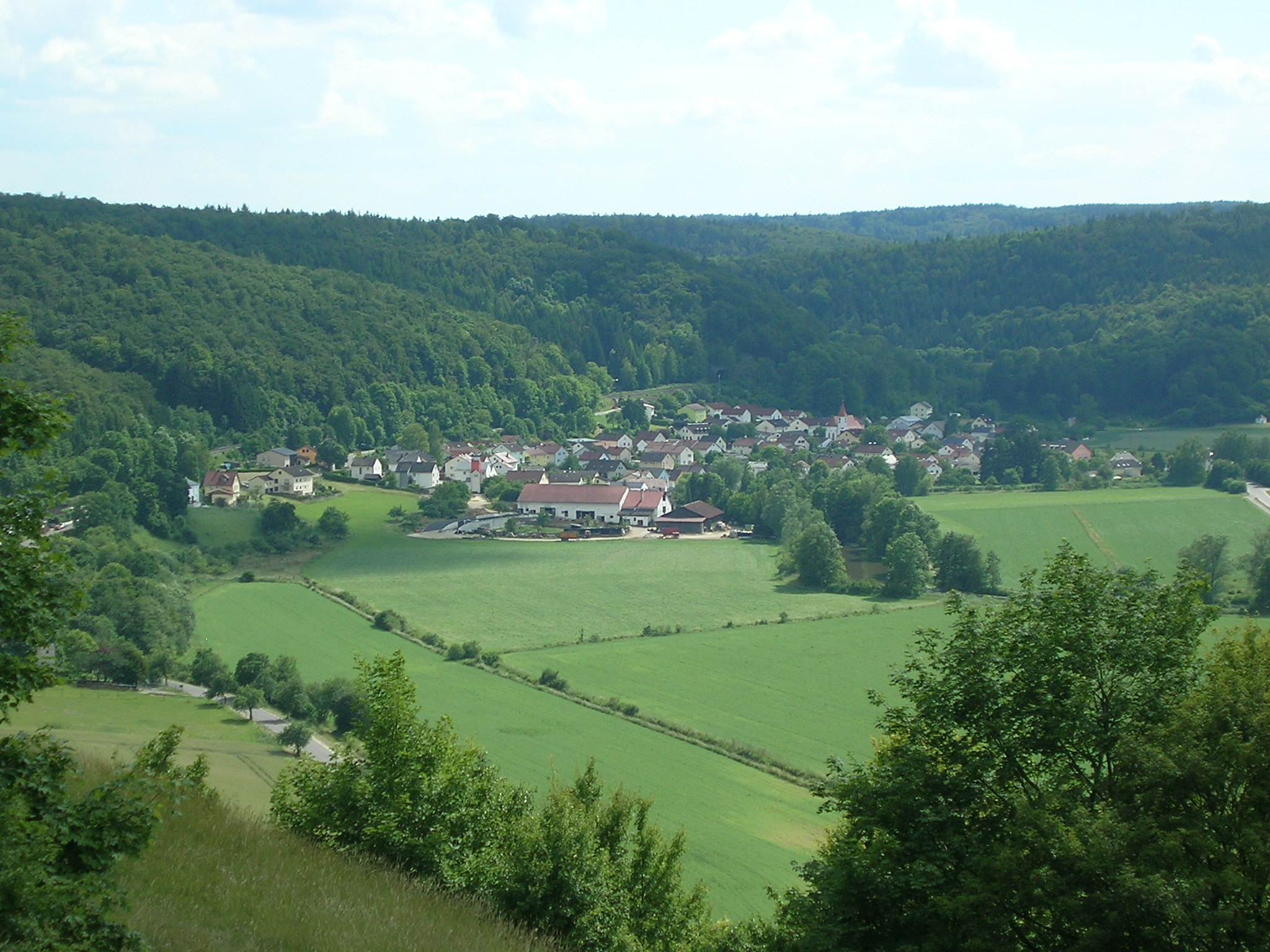
Villages and valleys

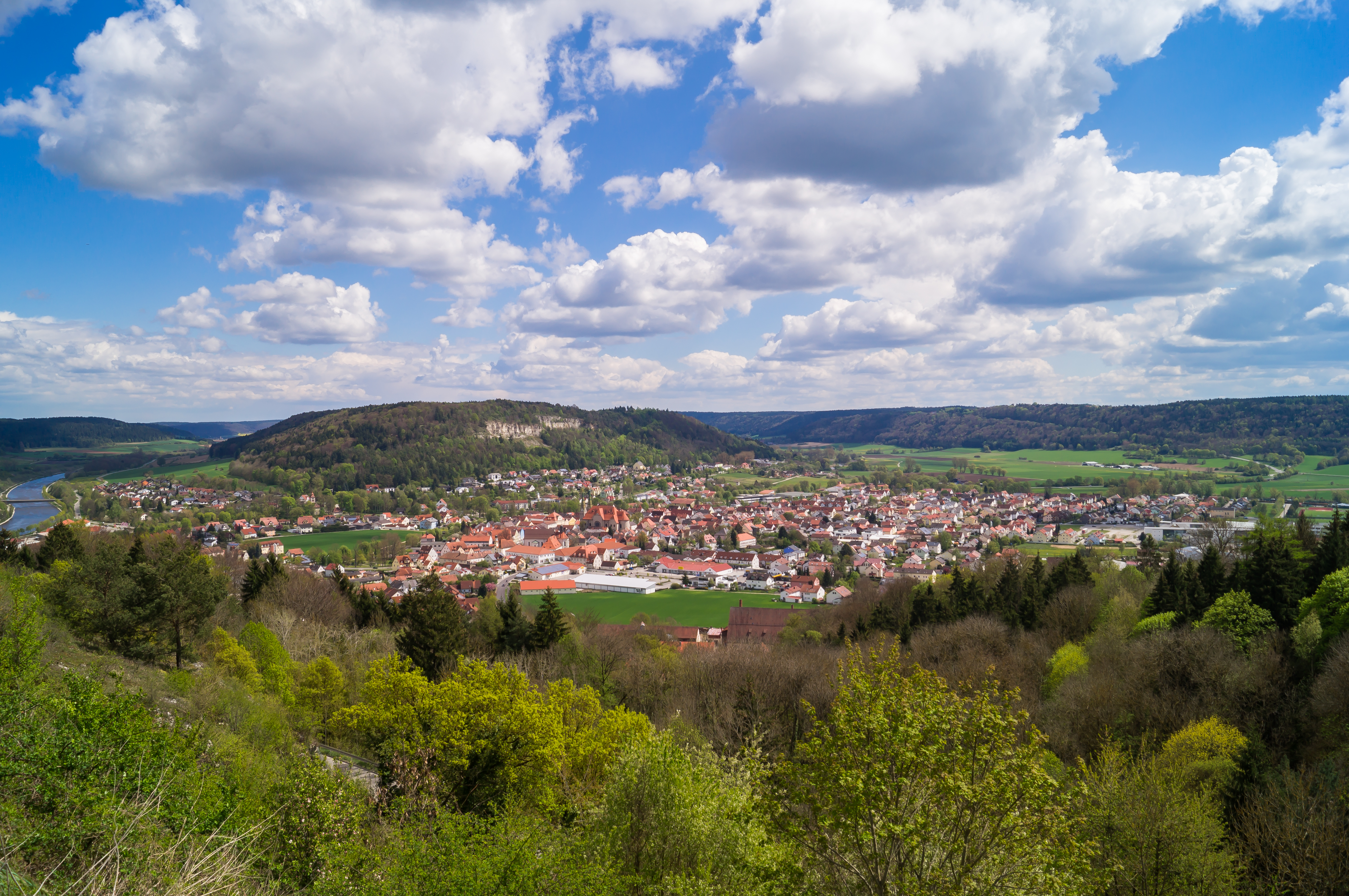
Arzberg

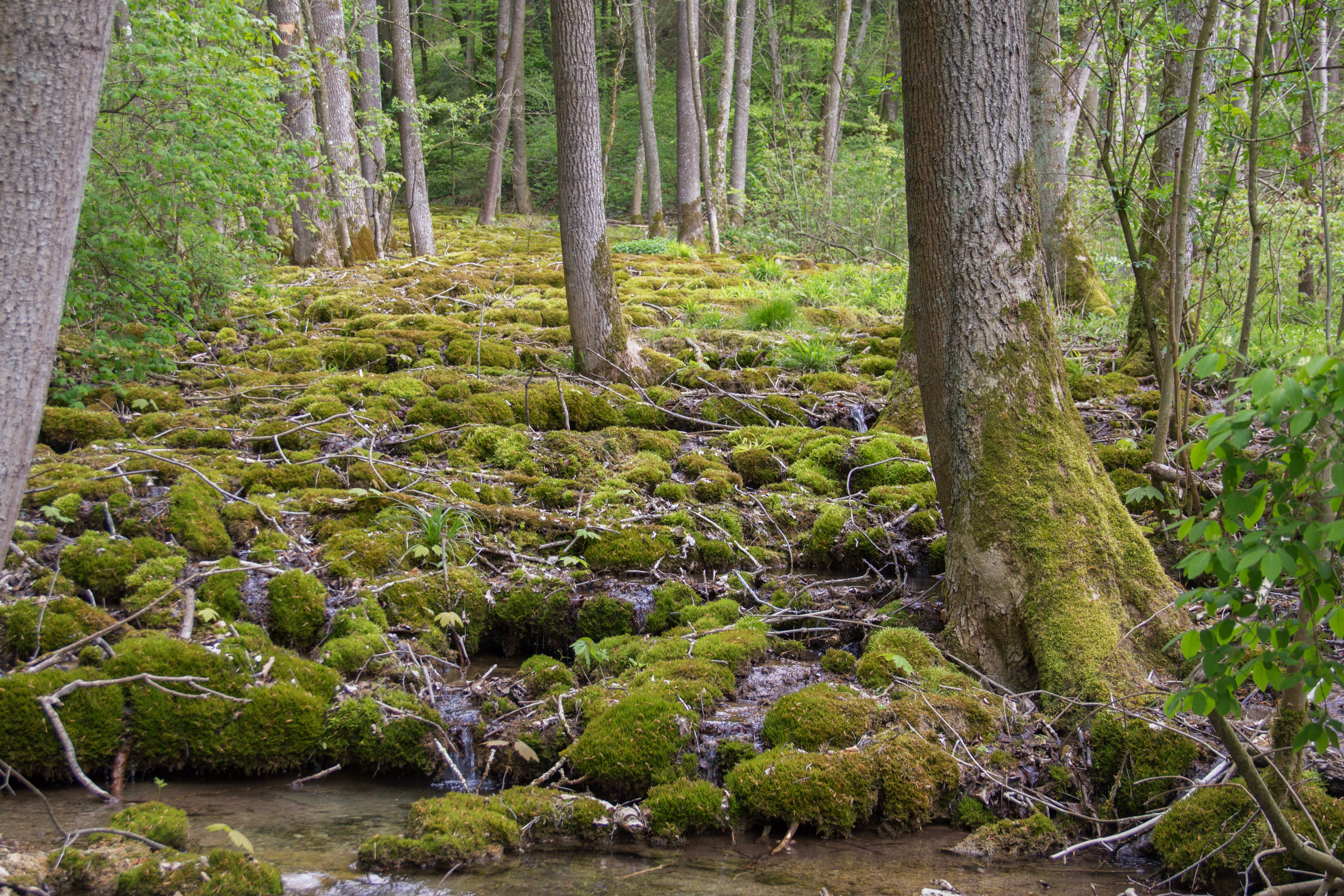
Sinter terraces

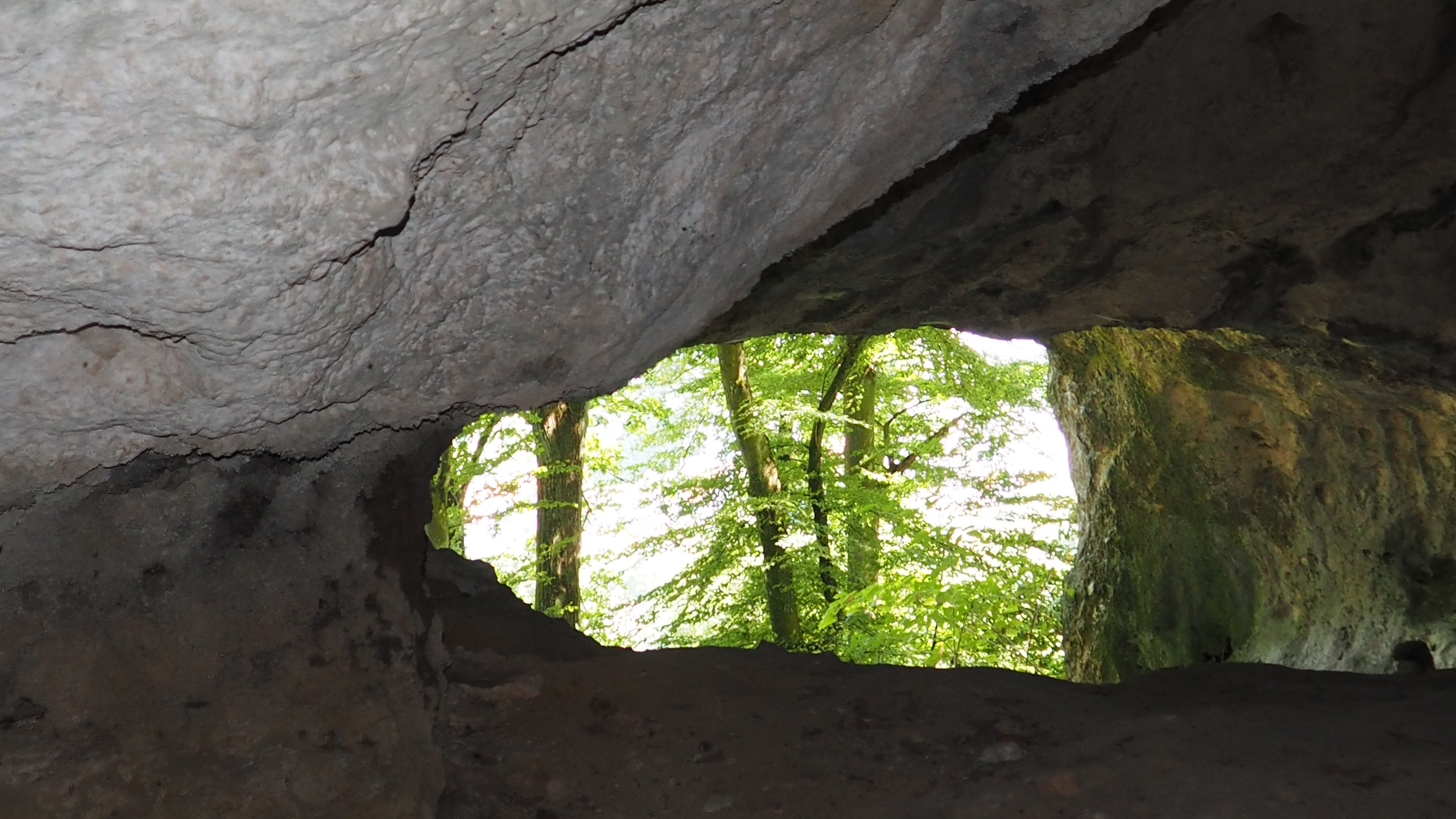
Cave-systems

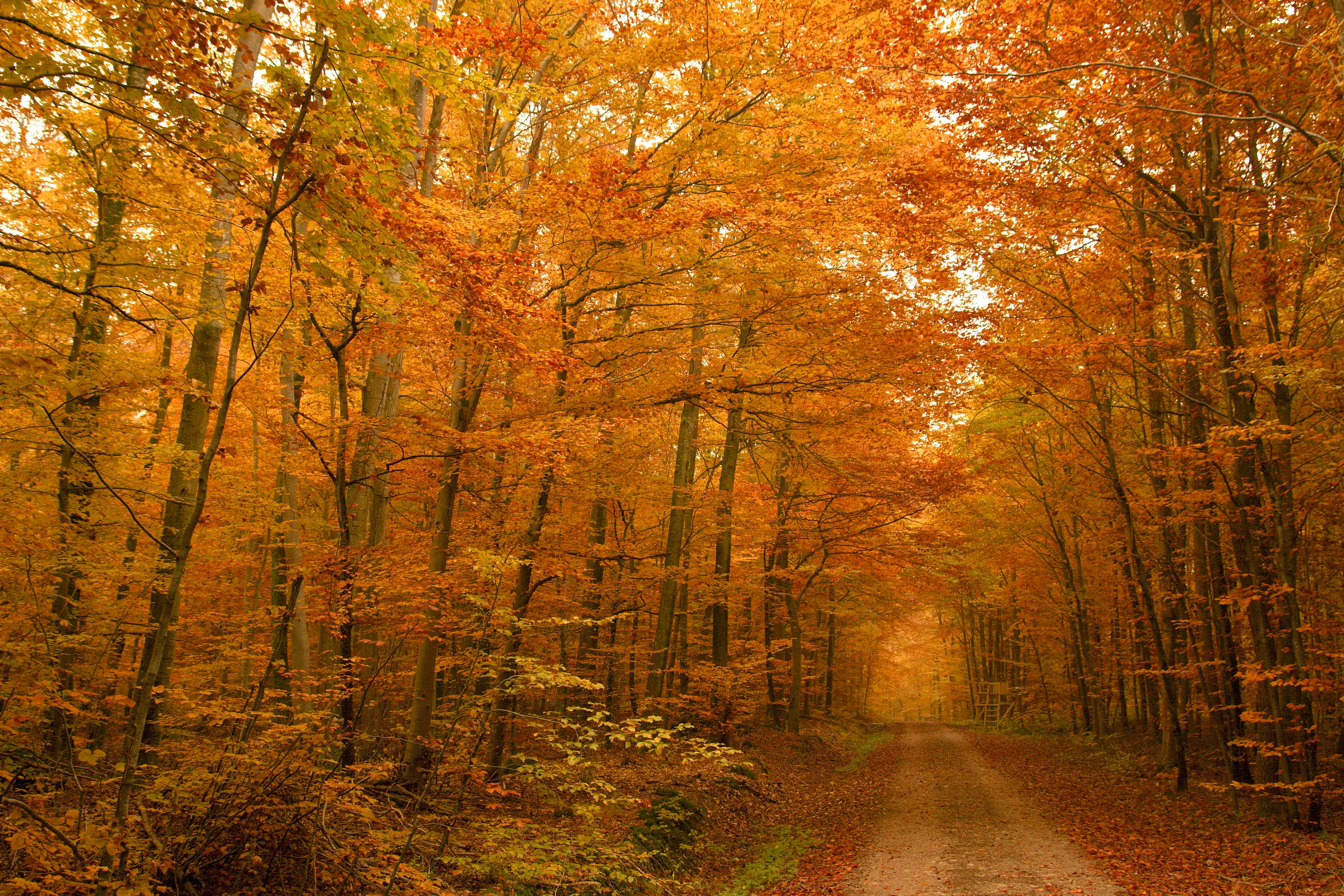
Autumn in Harburger Karab forest

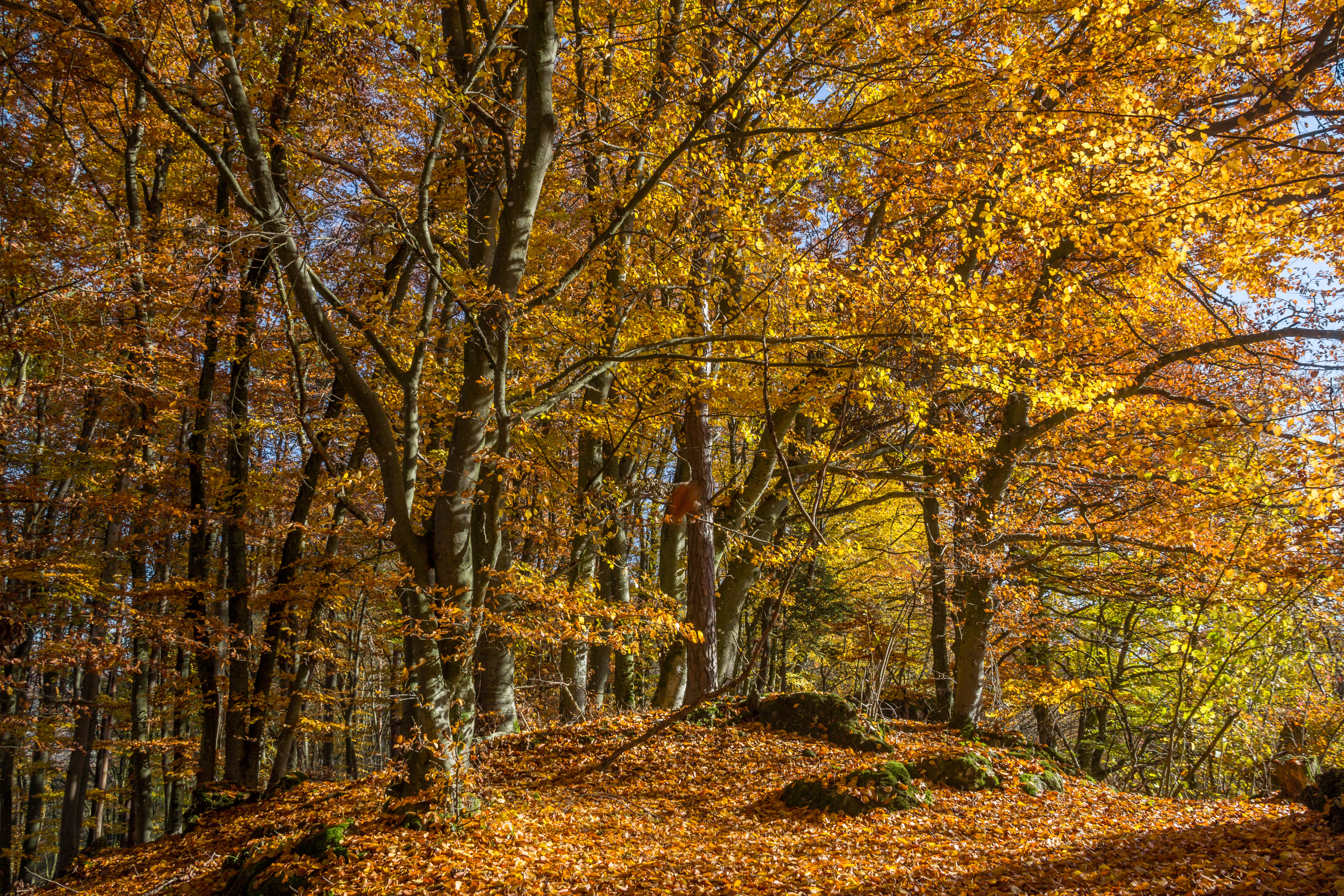
Autumn at Galgenberg

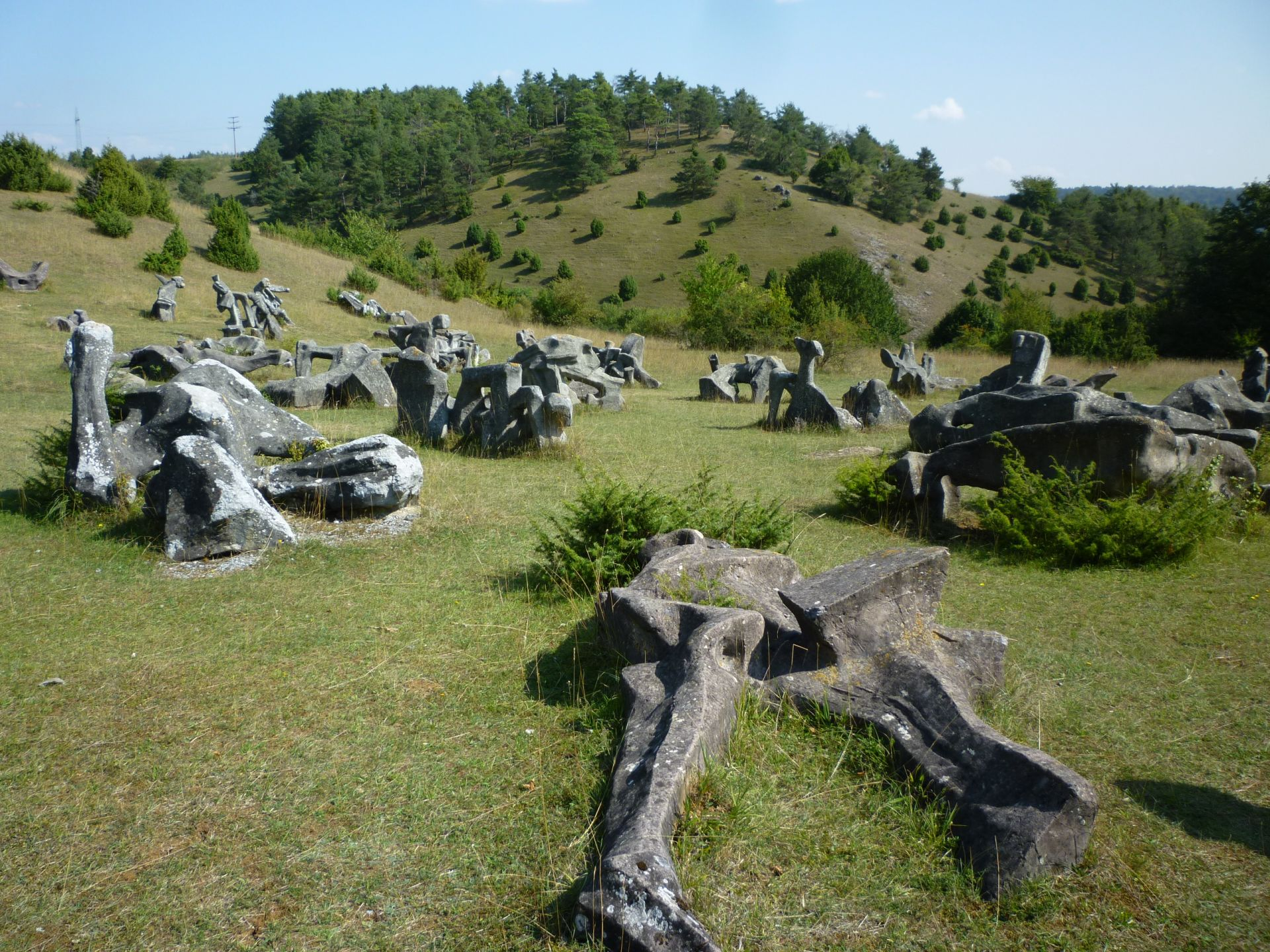
Figurenfeld sculpture park

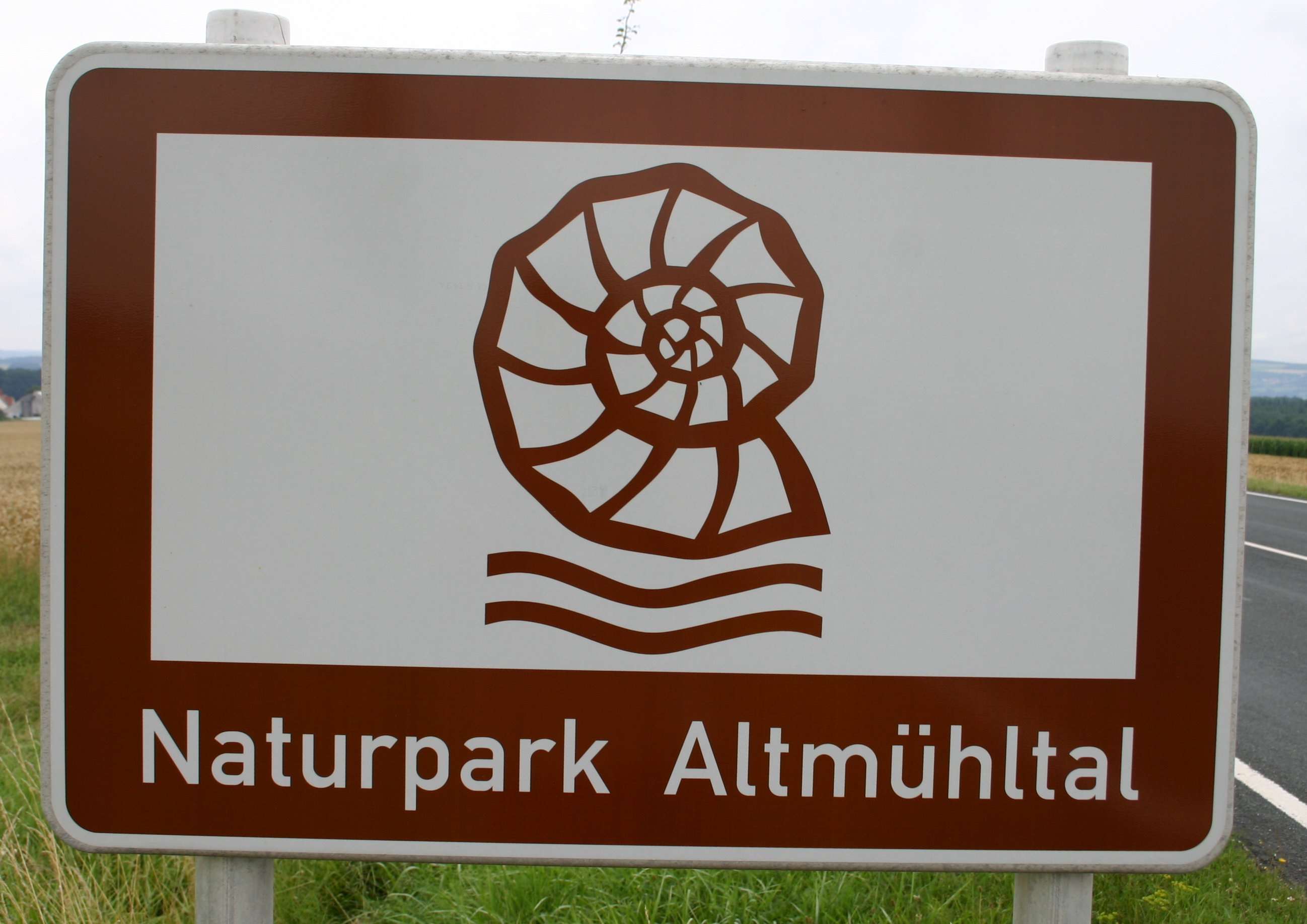
Nature park sign

== See also ==
- List of nature parks in Germany

== Literature ==
- Das Tal der Uraltmühl, 144 Seiten, Tümmels, Nuremberg, ISBN 3-921590-98-1
- Das Urdonautal der Altmühl, 132 Seiten, Tümmels, Nuremberg, ISBN 3-921590-88-4
