= Teterower See Ferry =

German ferry

Coordinates: 53.788521°N 12.592907°E

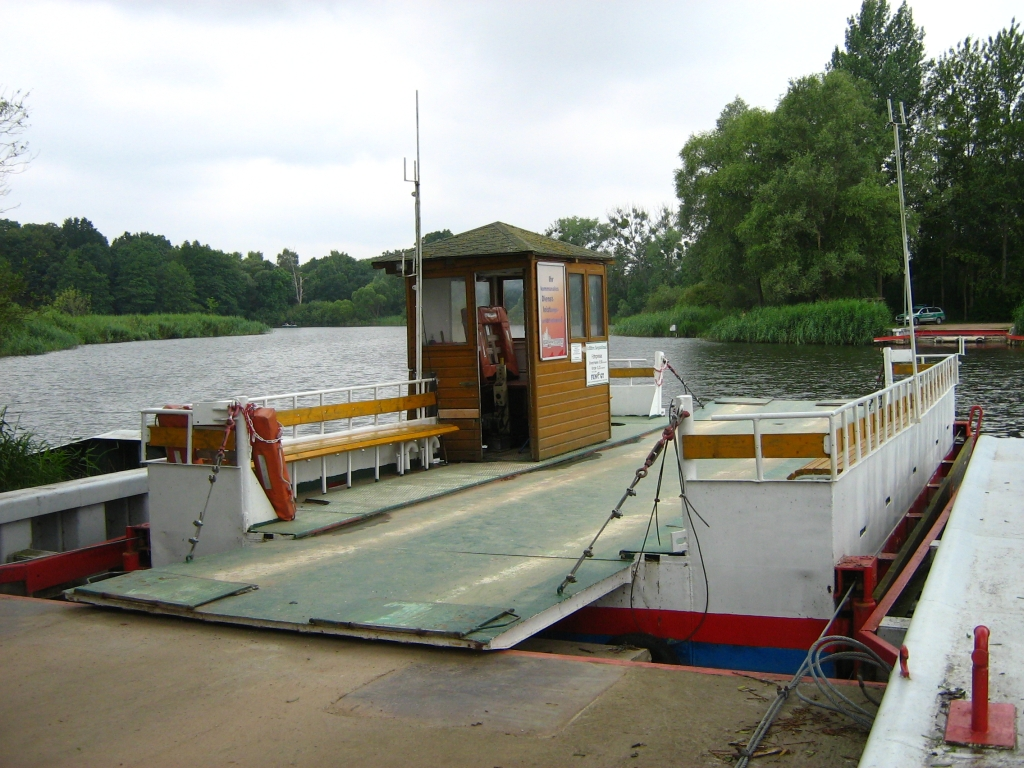
The Teterower See Ferry.

The Teterower See Ferry is a cable ferry providing access to the island of Burgwallinsel in the Teterower See in Mecklenburg-Vorpommern, Germany.
