= Mecklenburg Switzerland and Lake Kummerow Nature Park =

Coordinates: 53°46′N 12°44′E

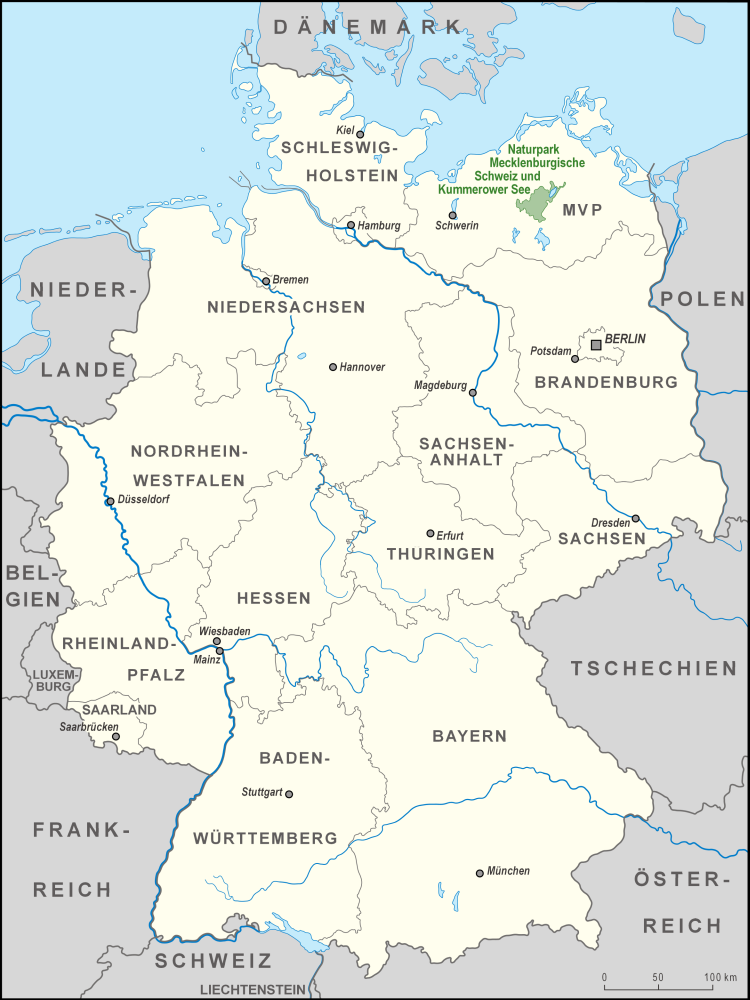
Location of the Mecklenburg Switzerland and Lake Kummerow Nature Park

The Mecklenburg Switzerland and Lake Kummerow Nature Park (German: Naturpark Mecklenburgische Schweiz und Kummerower See) lies in the northern part of the Mecklenburg Lake District in the districts of Mecklenburgische Seenplatte and Rostock in the German state of Mecklenburg-Vorpommern between the towns of Dargun, Demmin, Teterow, Malchin and Waren (Müritz). It was created in 1997. The total area of the nature park is 673 km^{2}. 19 percent of this area is covered by woodland, ca. 10 percent by lakes and rivers, the rest is cultural landscape. There are 3 large lakes in the naturepark: Lake Malchin, Lake Kummerow and Lake Teterow. The Peene is the largest river in the park. The features that make it special are the large lakes, the riverine landscapes, the centuries-old oaks, the castles, the manor houses and their rural estates. The nature park is well known as a stopover for Nordic ducks. It is easily reached from the A 19, motorway junctions Krakow am See and Güstrow, or the A 20, junctions Tessin and Bad Sülze. The head office of the nature park administration is in Basedow.

== Nature reserves in the park ==
There are nine nature reserves, that lies wholly or partly in the nature park:

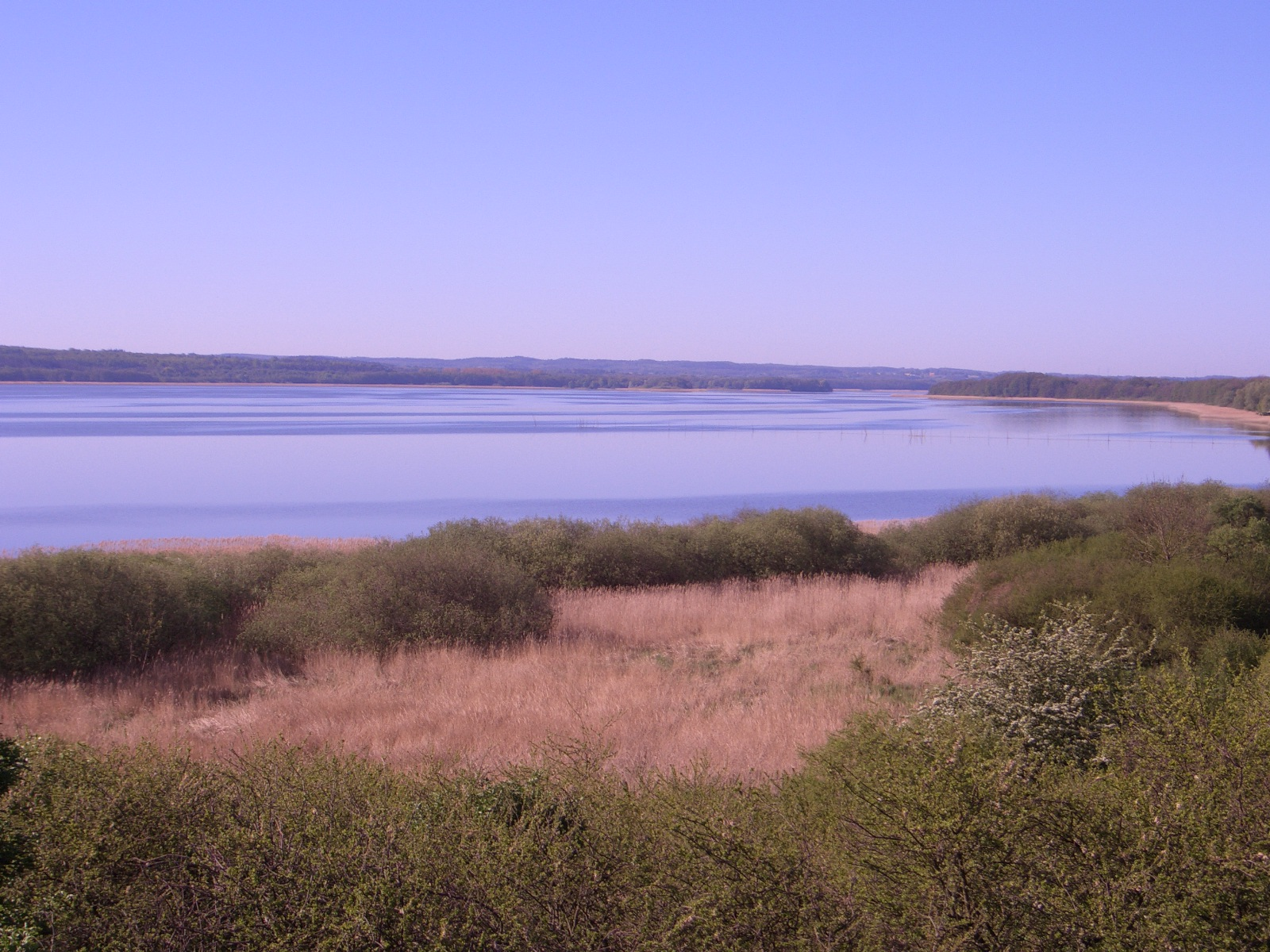
Lake Malchin

- Barschmoor (33 ha)
- Binsenbrink im Teterower See (74 ha)
- Gruber Forst (377 ha)
- Hellgrund (21 ha)
- Wendischhagen Chalk Transitional Bog
- Peene Valley from Salem to Jarmen (6,716 ha), includes the former nature reserves of Moorwiesen bei Neukalen and Devener Holz
- Push Moraine North of Remplin (146 ha)
- Teterower Heidberge (198 ha)
- Wüste and Glase (188 ha)

== See also ==
- List of nature parks in Germany
