= Teterower See =

Lake in Mecklenburg-Vorpommern, Germany

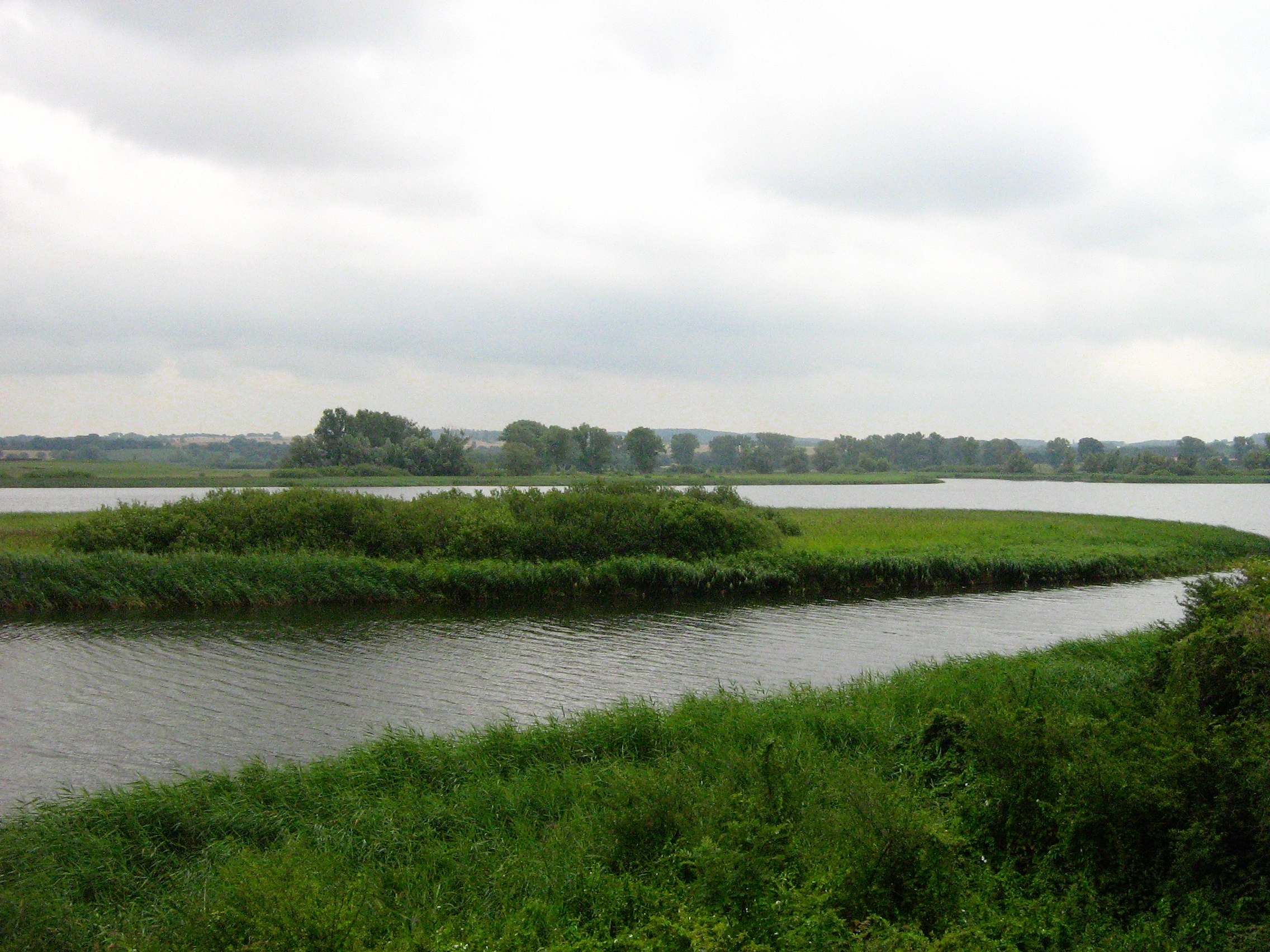

- Location within Mecklenburg-Vorpommern
- Location: Teterow, Mecklenburg-Vorpommern
- Coordinates: 53.791389°N 12.607778°E
- Basin countries: Germany
- Max. length: 3.3 km (2.1 mi)
- Max. width: 1.9 km (1.2 mi)
- Surface area: 3.36 km^{2} (1.30 sq mi)
- Average depth: 4 m (13 ft)
- Max. depth: 10.7 m (35 ft)
- Surface elevation: 2.4 m (7 ft 10 in)
- Islands: Burgwallinsel

The Teterower See is a lake located in the Mecklenburg Switzerland and Lake Kummerow Nature Park of Mecklenburg-Vorpommern, Germany. It is situated immediately to the northeast of the town of Teterow, and is about 200 kilometres (120 mi) north of Berlin.

The lake is approximately 3.3 kilometres (2.1 mi) long and 1.9 kilometres (1.2 mi) wide, with an average depth of 4 metres (13 ft) and a maximum depth of 10.7 metres (35 ft). It has an area of 3.36 square kilometres (1.30 sq mi), and is only 2.4 metres (7 ft 10 in) above sea level. The southern shoreline is heavily indented, and includes the Sauerwerder peninsular and the Burgwallinsel island.

Burgwallinsel is accessed by the Teterower See Ferry, a cable ferry. Also operating on the lake is the historic cruise ship Regulus, originally built in 1910 and first used on the Teterower See in 1930. During the Second World War it was sunk. In 1999, the wreck was found in the lake and salvaged. It was returned to use in 2001.
