= Malchiner See =

Lake in Mecklenburg-Vorpommern, Germany

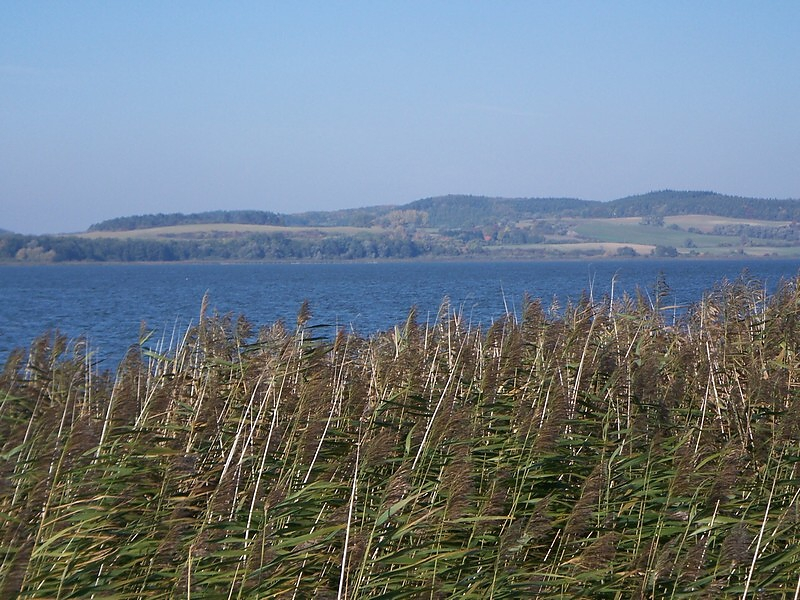

- Location within Mecklenburg-Vorpommern
- Location: Mecklenburgische Seenplatte and Rostock (district), Mecklenburg-Vorpommern
- Coordinates: 53°41′39″N 12°38′3″E
- Primary inflows: Westpeene, Mühlenbach, Lupenbach
- Primary outflows: Dahmer Kanal
- Basin countries: Germany
- Surface area: 13.95 km^{2} (5.39 sq mi)
- Average depth: 2 m (6 ft 7 in)
- Max. depth: 10 m (33 ft)
- Surface elevation: 0.8 m (2 ft 7 in)

Malchiner See is a lake between the Mecklenburgische Seenplatte and Rostock (district) districts in Mecklenburg-Vorpommern, Germany. At an elevation of 0.8 m, its surface area is 13.95 km^{2}. It is connected to Lake Kummerow by the Peene and Dahme rivers. It is part of the Mecklenburg Switzerland and Lake Kummerow Nature Park.
