= Bergstraße-Odenwald Nature Park =

Nature park in southern Germany

Bergstraße-Odenwald
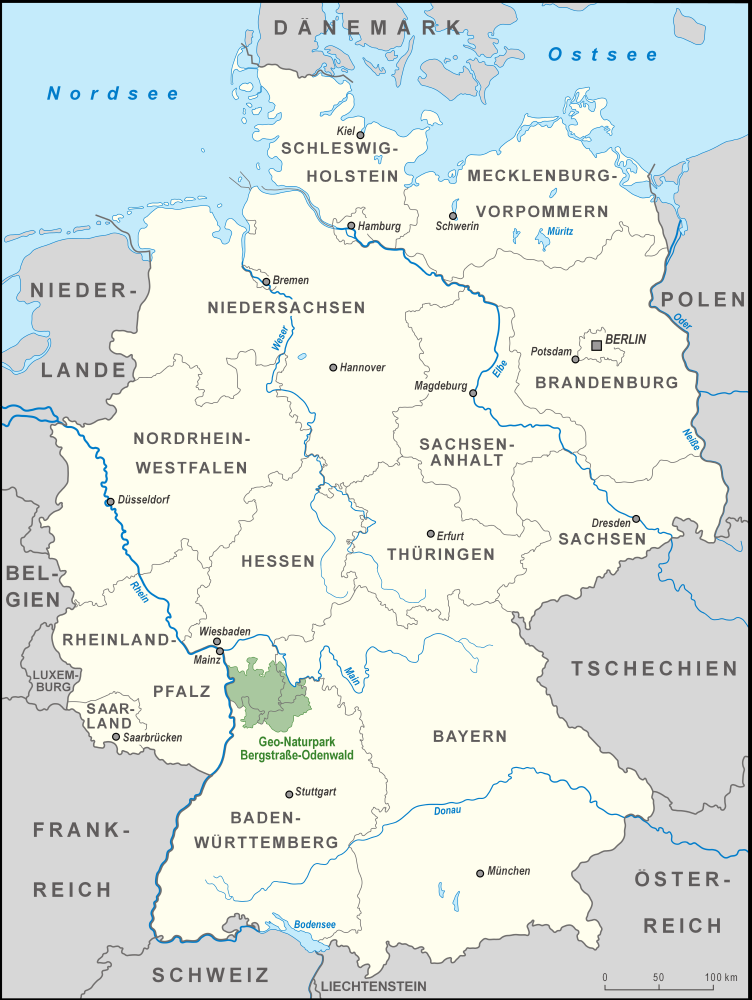
- Map
- Interactive map of Bergstraße-Odenwald
- Location: Odenwald
- Coordinates: 49°41′39″N 9°10′31″E
- Designation: NP-00001
- Established: 1960

The Bergstraße-Odenwald Nature Park (German: Geo-Naturpark Bergstraße-Odenwald) is a nature park in southern Germany with an area of 3,500 km² that lies between the rivers Rhine, Main (river) and Neckar. In the south it overlaps in places with the Neckar Valley-Odenwald Nature Park on the territory of Baden-Württemberg. In the east it meets the Bavarian Spessart Nature Park at the River Main. The nature park covers parts of the states of Baden-Württemberg, Bavaria and Hesse.

== Sights ==
- Messel Pit,
- Lorsch Abbey,
- Kühkopf-Knoblochsaue, Stockstadt am Rhein
- Odenwald Limes
- Felsenmeer near Reichenbach, Lautertal (Odenwald)
- Obrunn Gorge between Höchst im Odenwald and Rimhorn
- Heidelberg and Heidelberg Castle
- Lösswand von Haarlass in Heidelberg, the first scientific description of which by Karl Cäsar von Leonhard in 1824 led to the introduction of the term loess
- Katzenbuckel – at 626 metres, the highest point in the Odenwald
- Odenwald Open Air Museum in Walldürn-Gottersdorf
- Eberstadt Stalactite Cave near Buchen (Odenwald)
- Bergstraße Nature Conservation Centre near Bensheim
- Marie in der Kohlbach Pit, a visitor mine, near Hohensachsen
- Anna Elisabeth Pit, another visitor mine, near Schriesheim

== Gallery ==
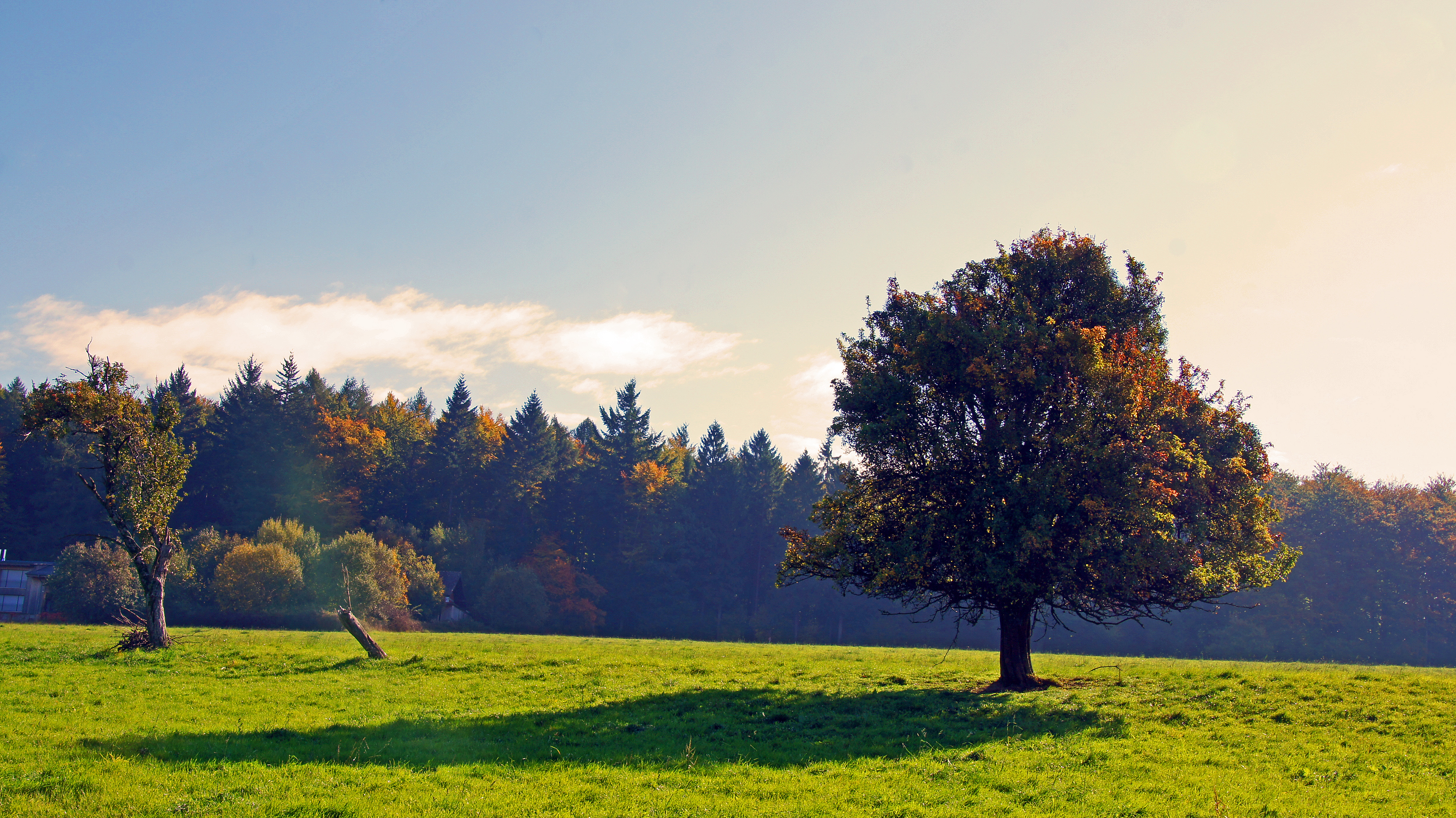
Autumn in Ober-Hambach.

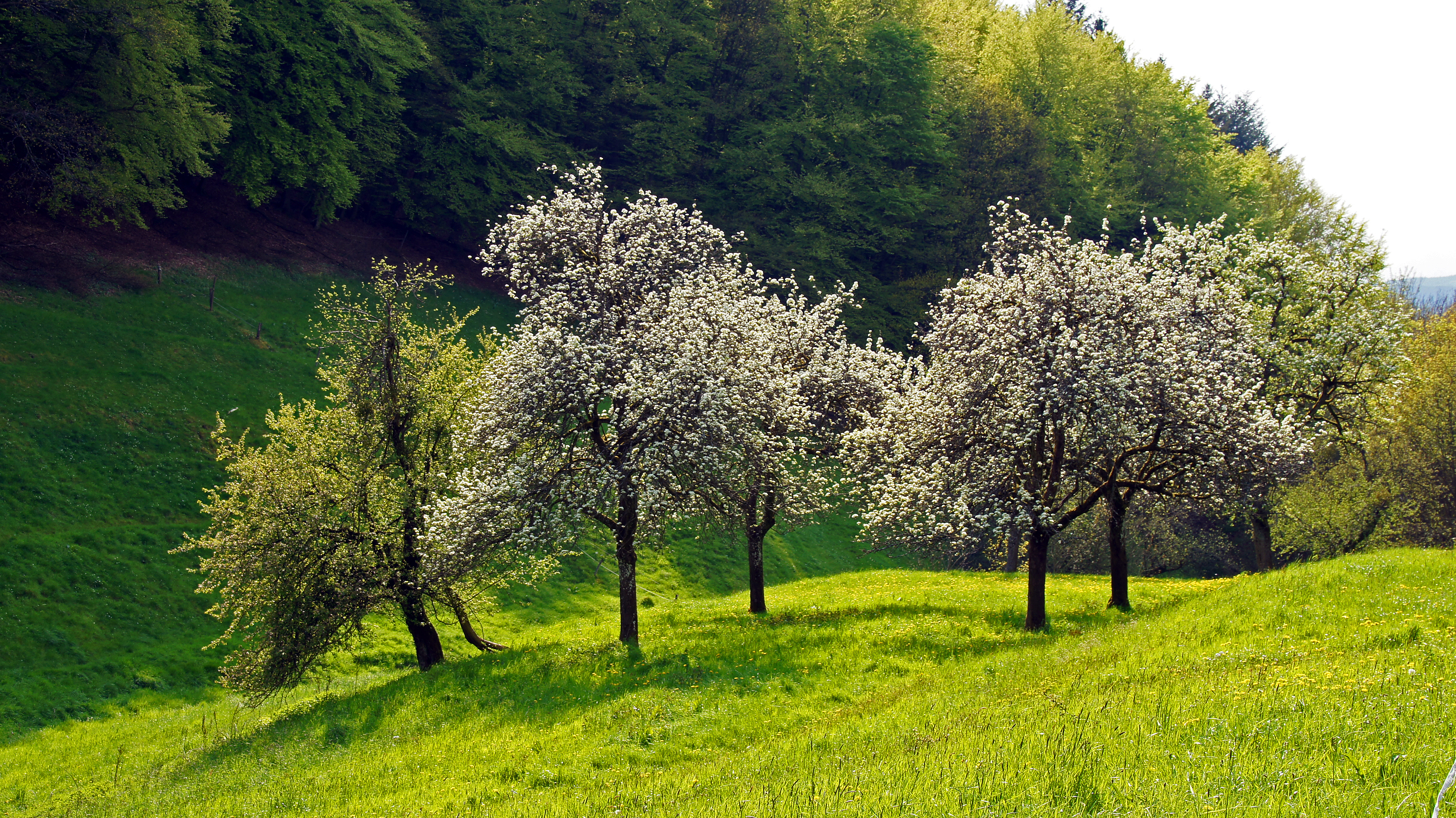
Blossoming trees in Alt-Lechtern.

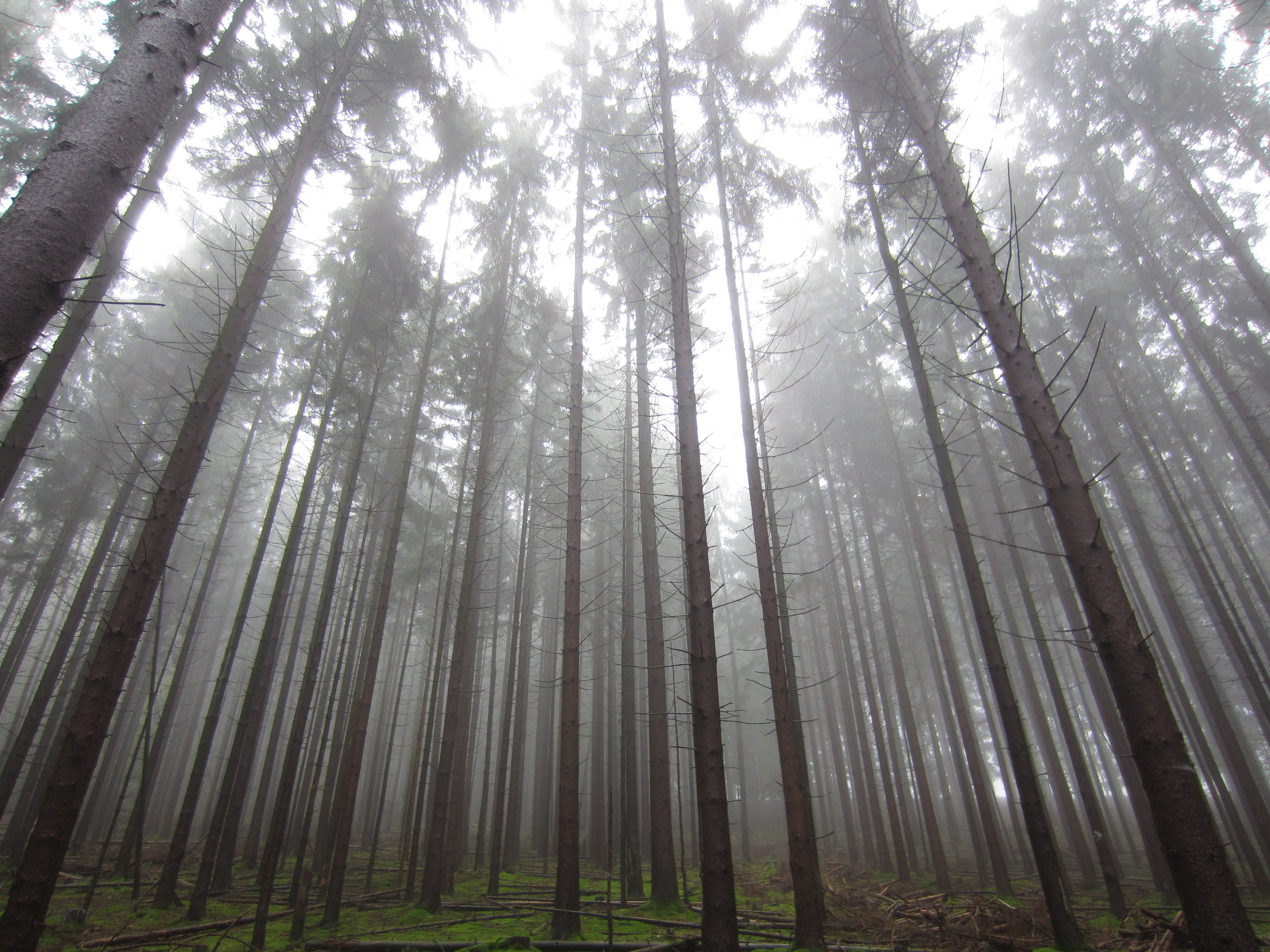
Beerfelden bike park.

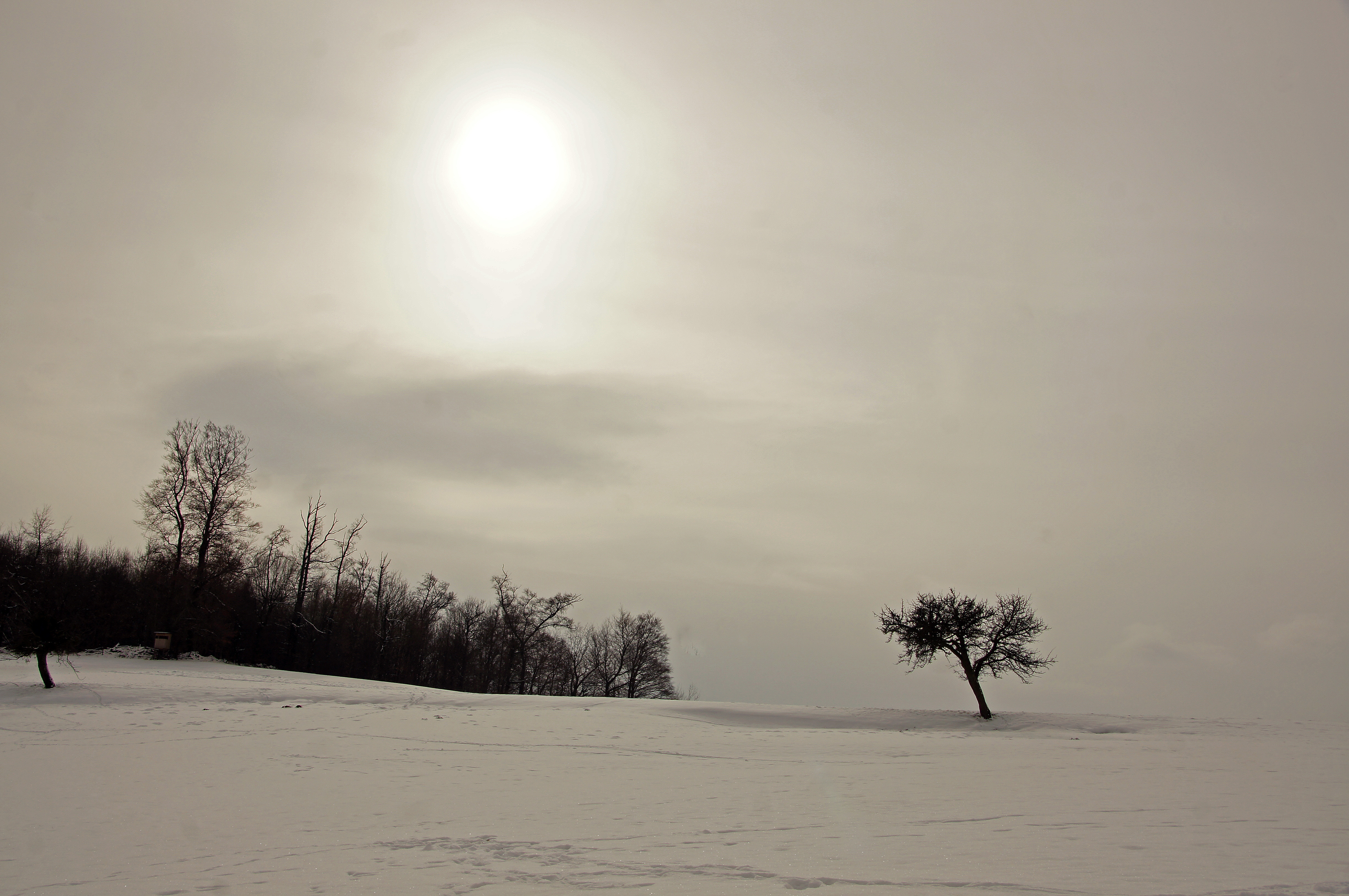
Winter in Lindenfels.

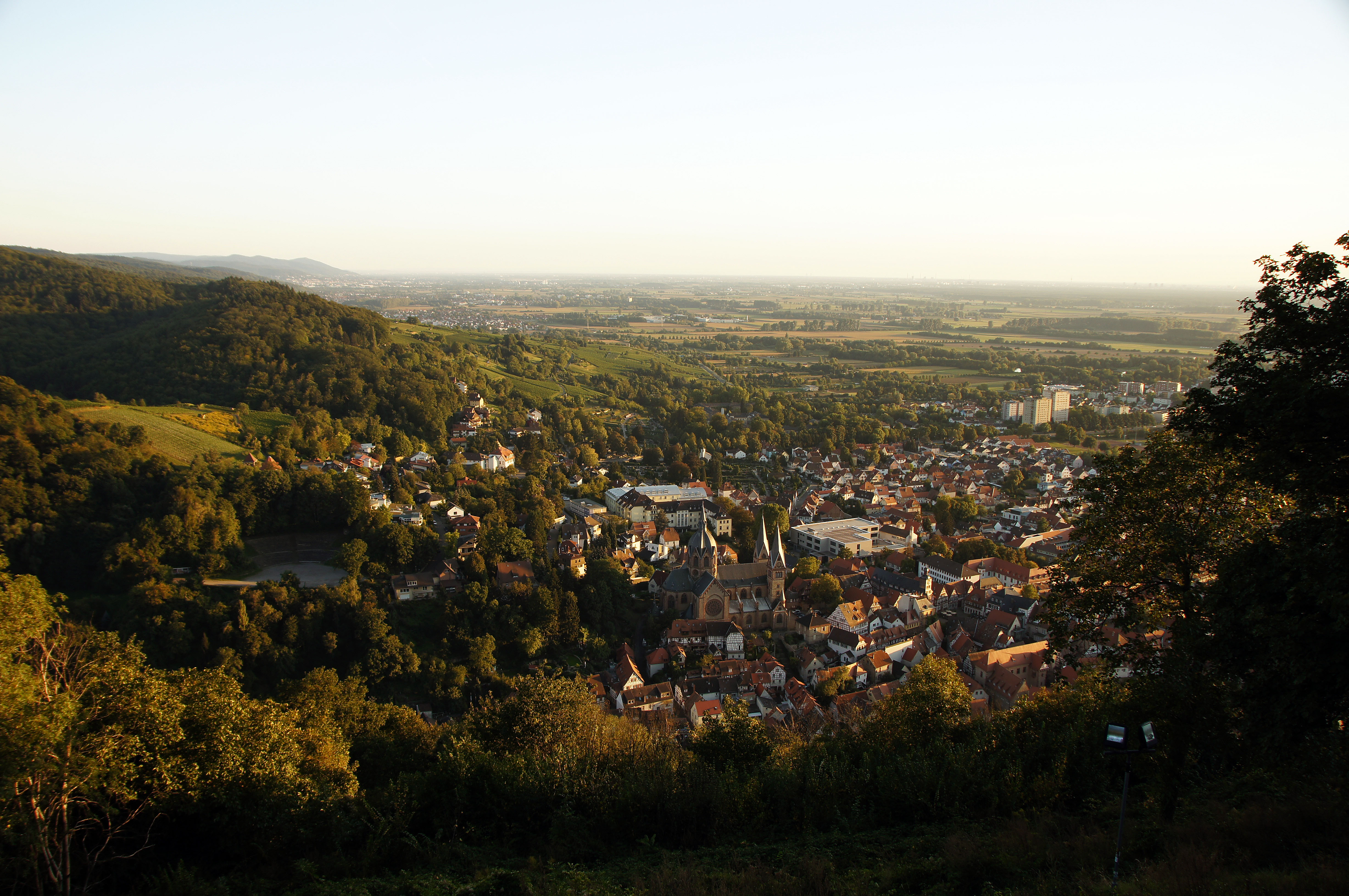
Heppenheim.

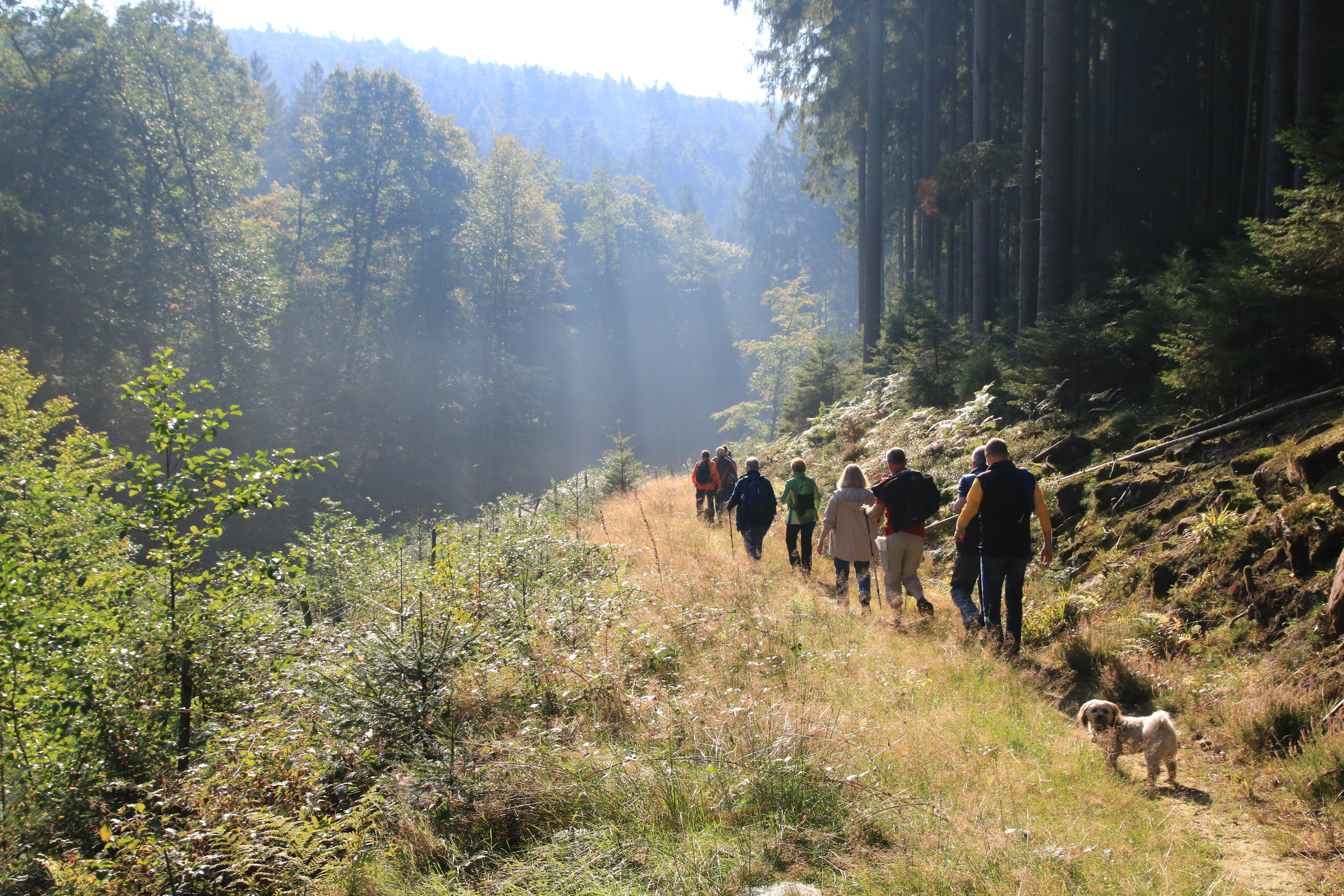
Hiking in the Dürr-Ellenbacher valley, Wald-Michelbach.

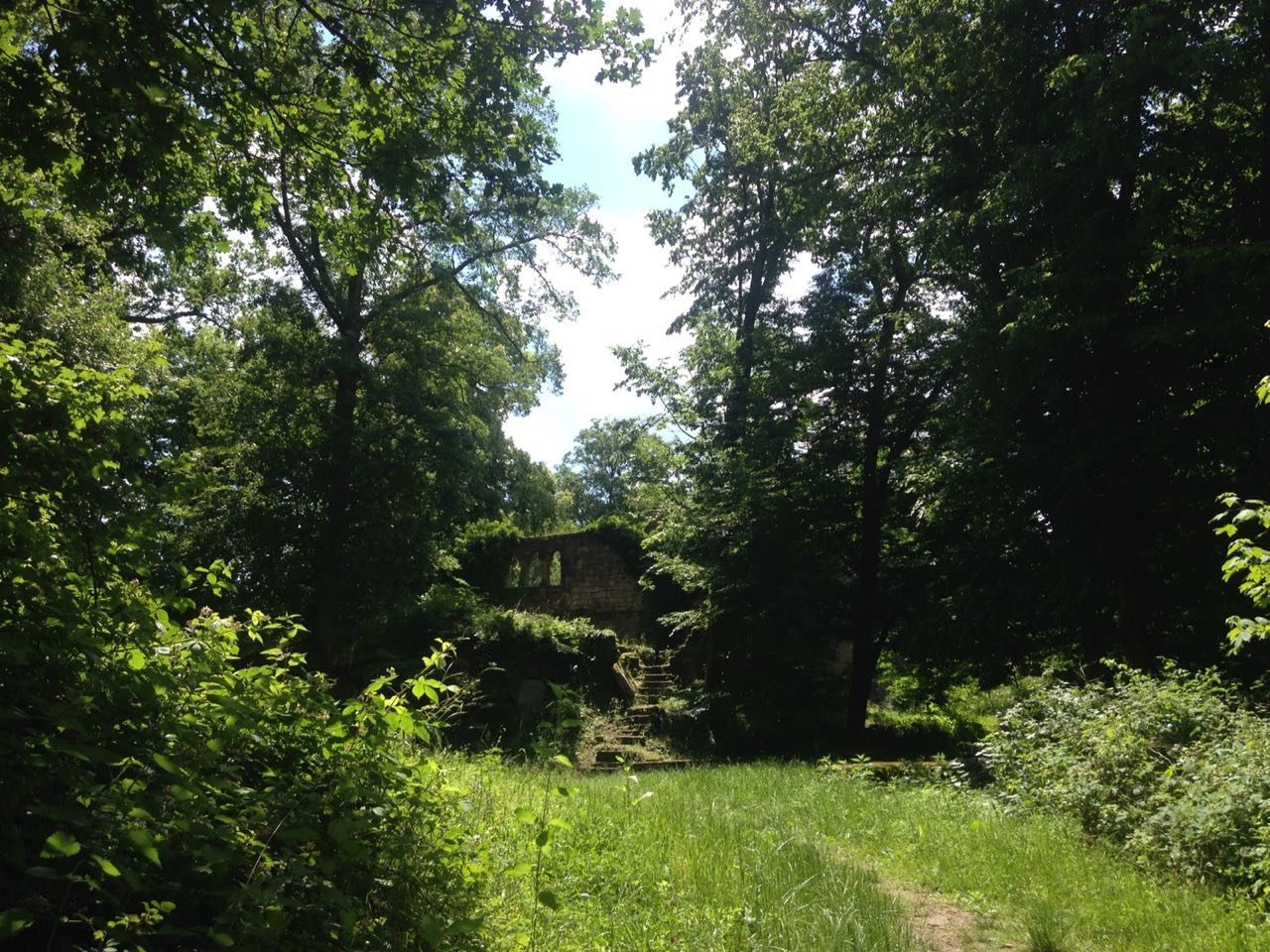
Eberbach castle.

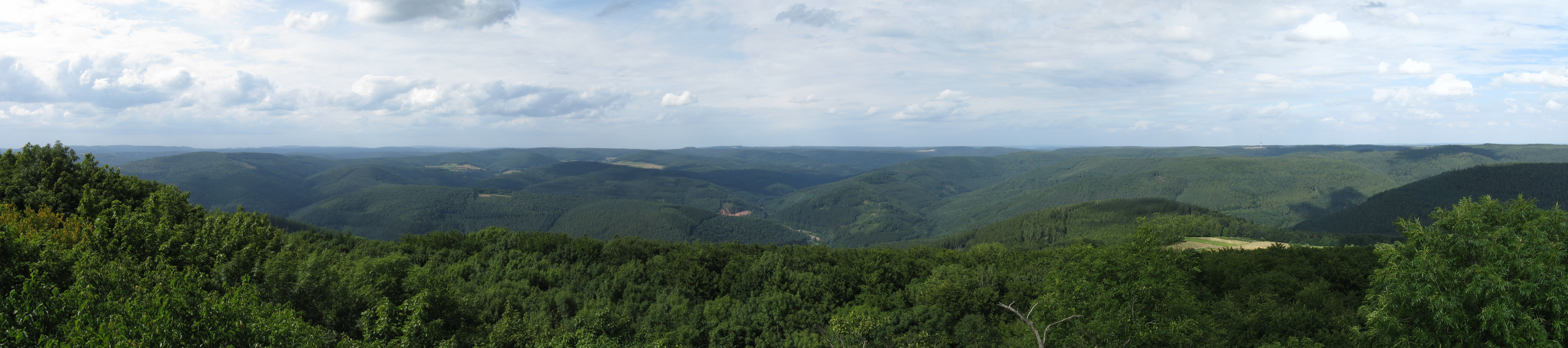
Panoramic view from Katzenbuckel to the north.

== See also ==
- List of nature parks in Germany
