= Hans-Jürgen Syberberg filmography =

German filmmaker filmography

Hans-Jürgen Syberberg (born 8 December 1935) is a German filmmaker. He emerged in the 1960s as a participant in the New German Cinema. He became known for his combination of playful and theatrical style, inspired by Bertolt Brecht and Richard Wagner, and serious examinations of German culture and society. He received international acclaim in the 1970s and early 1980s. Since the early 1990s, he has been a controversial figure in international cinema due to his political comments about post-war Germany, making his work less available and less discussed in the mainstream.

== Filmography ==
Year	English title	Original title	Notes	Ref
1965	Fünfter Akt, Siebte Szene. Fritz Kortner probt Kabale und Liebe			
1965	Romy: Anatomy of a Face	Romy. Anatomie eines Gesichts		
1966	Fritz Kortner spricht Monologue für eine Schallplatte			
1966	Wilhelm von Kobell			
1966	Die Grafen Pocci – einige Kapitel zur Geschichte einer Familie			
1969	Scarabea: How Much Land Does a Man Need?	Scarabea – Wieviel Erde braucht der Mensch?		
1970	Sex-Business: Made in Pasing			
1970	San Domingo			
1970	Nach meinem letzten Umzug			
1972	Ludwig: Requiem for a Virgin King	Ludwig – Requiem für einen jungfräulichen König		
1972	Theodor Hierneis oder Wie man ehem. Hofkoch wird			
1974	Karl May			
1975	The Confessions of Winifred Wagner	Winifred Wagner und die Geschichte des Hauses Wahnfried von 1914–1975	Original: 302 min, US version: 104 min	
1977	Hitler: A Film from Germany	Hitler. Ein Film aus Deutschland		
1982	Parsifal			
1985	Die Nacht			
1985	Edith Clever liest Joyce			
1986	Fräulein Else			
1987	Penthesilea			
1989	Die Marquise von O.			
1993	Syberberg filmt Brecht			
1995	A Dream, What Else?	Ein Traum, was sonst?		
1997	Höhle der Erinnerung			
2004	The Ister		Interviewee only	
2023	Demminer Chants	Demminer Gesänge		
