= German Avenue Road =

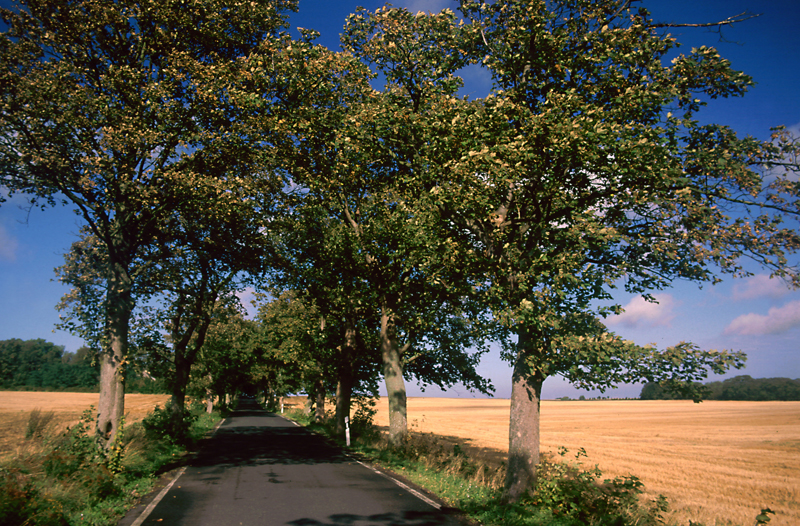
Portion of the German Avenue Road on Rügen

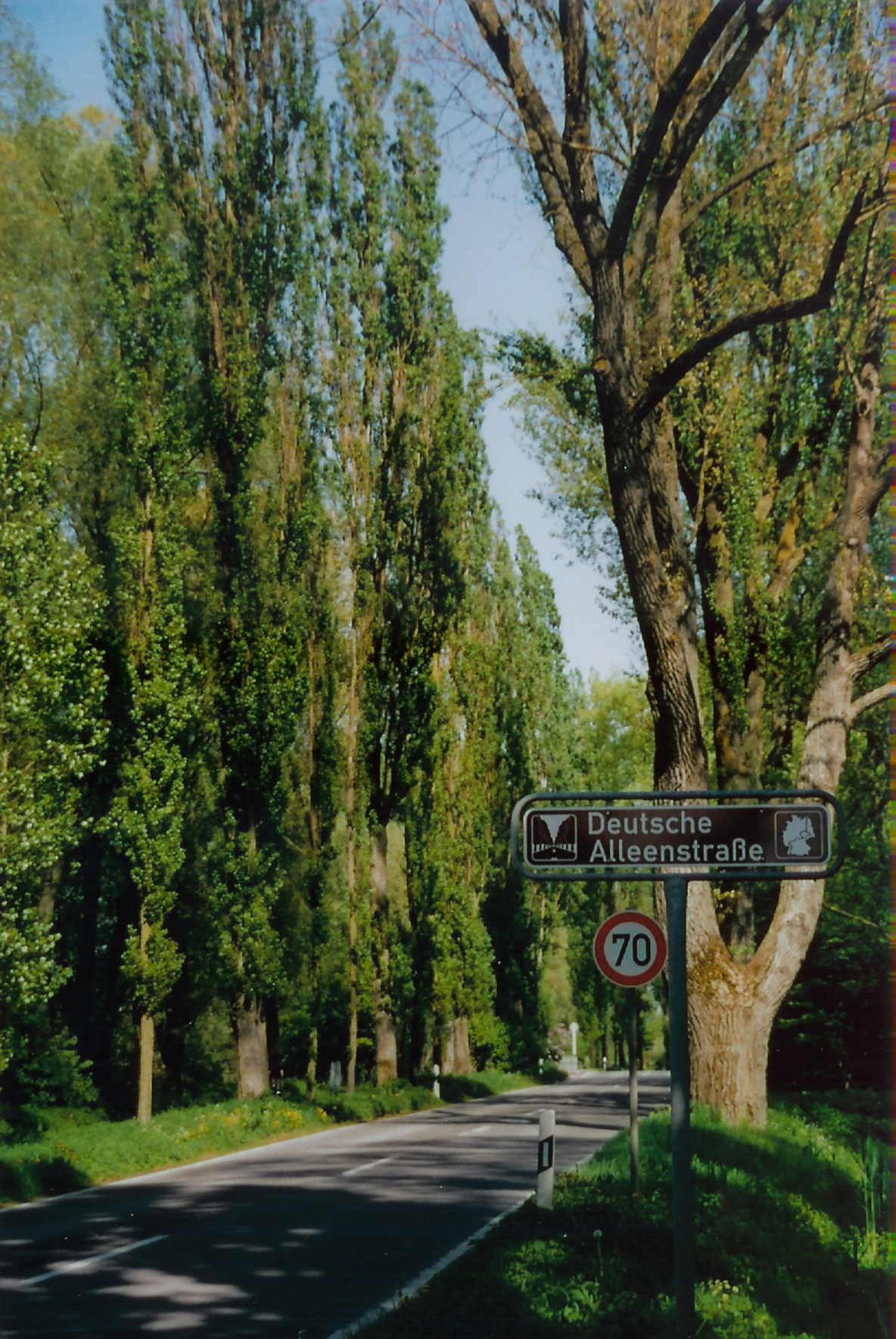
Portion of the German Avenue Road near Lake Constance

The German Avenue Road (German: Deutsche Alleenstraße) is a tree-lined holiday route that runs the length of Germany from Rügen on the Baltic Sea to Lake Constance on its border with Switzerland. About 2,900 kilometres (1,800 mi) long, it is Germany's longest scenic route. The project is supported by the "German Avenue Route Association" (Arbeitsgemeinschaft Deutsche Alleenstraße), whose members are the German Automobile Club ("ADAC"), the German Tourism Association, the German Forest Conservation Society, and other institutions. The forestry scientist, Hans Joachim Fröhlich, was its major proponent.

The aim of the Association is to preserve, protect, and maintain avenues in Germany and to restore old avenues after they were destroyed in many places in recent years by road development and safety projects. The Association says the Route connects "the East with West and North to South [and] is a symbol of German unity and common effort of the people of the old and new federal states for the protection of nature."

Cobblestones still serve as pavement on many avenues in the former East German areas. An spokesman for the Route says the average speed is about 70 km/h (43 mph).

The first segment of the German Avenue Road between Rügen Island in the Baltic Sea and Reinsberg was inaugurated on 3 May 1993, progressively completed over the next several years, and completed on 25 May 2000 with the segment from Ettlingen, near Karlsruhe, to the island of Reichenau in Lake Constance on the German-Swiss border.

== History ==
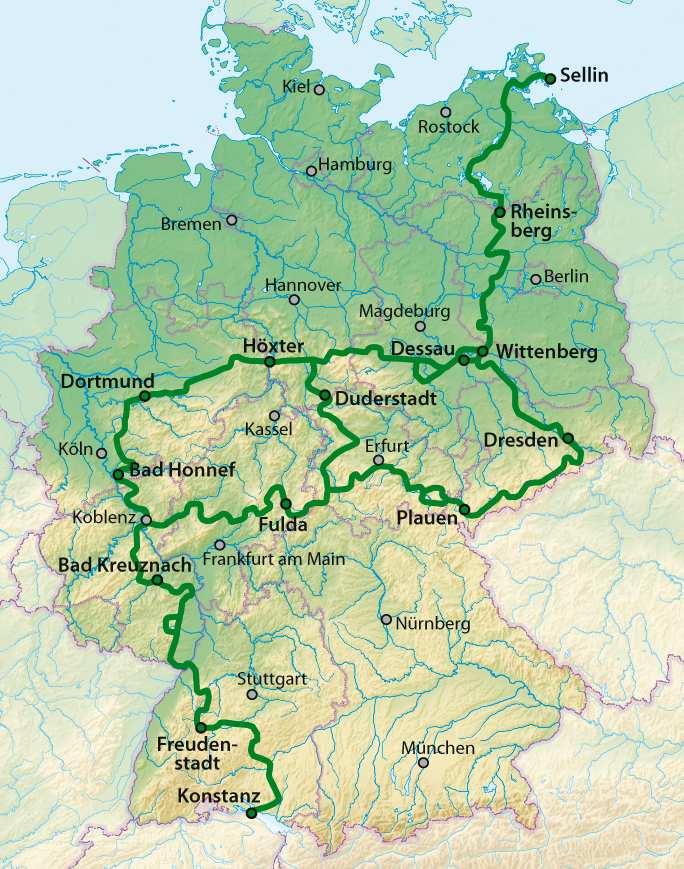
Route of the German Avenue Road from Rügen in the northeast to Lake Constance in the southwest

The vision for the creation of the German Avenue Road began shortly after German reunification in 1990:

1. 9 November 1989 – Opening of the Berlin Wall between West and East Berlin.
2. 3 October 1990 – Reunification of Germany.
3. Fall 1990 – ADAC, in its Motorworld magazine, issued an appeal to "Save the Avenues" of the former East Germany.
4. Summer 1992 – Foundation established for "German Avenue Route" as a tourist facility and ideal connection between the old and new federal German states.
5. 3 May 1993 – Opening of the first section between Sellin / Rügen and Rheinberg / Brandenburg (264 kilometres (164 mi))
6. 2 October 1993 – Opening of the second part between Rheinberg / Brandenburg and Wittenberg / Saxony-Anhalt (168 kilometres (104 mi))
7. 29 September 1994 – Opening of the 3rd section between Wittenberg / Saxony-Anhalt and Goslar / Lower Saxony (249 kilometres (155 mi))
8. 13 June 1995 – Opening of the 4th section between Goslar / Lower Saxony and Dresden and Plauen / Saxony (680 kilometres (420 mi))
9. 26 June 1996—Opening of the 5th leg between Duderstadt / Plauen and Fulda (Lower Saxony, Saxony-Anhalt, Saxony, Thuringia, Hesse, 820 kilometres (510 mi))
10. 30 April 1997—Opening of the 6th Leg between Meiningen (Thuringia) and Braubach am Rhein (Rhineland-Palatinate, 530 kilometres (330 mi))
11. 6 May 1998—Opening of the 7th Leg between Braubach (Rhineland-Palatinate) and Karlsruhe / Ettingen (Baden-Wuerttemberg, 290 kilometres (180 mi))
12. 25 May 2000—Opening of the 8th and final leg from Ettingen to the island of Reichenau in Lake Constance on the border with Switzerland (Baden-Wuerttemberg, 539 kilometres (335 mi))

== Route ==
Stage	Route
Stage 1	Rügen (Cape Arkona / Sellin) – Putbus – Garz/Rügen – Stralsund (following the Bundesstraße 194) – Grimmen – Loitz – Demmin – Borrentin (branching off in the Grammentin Forest) – Grammentin – Kummerow – Malchin – Dahmen – Malchow – Sietow – Röbel – Wesenberg – Rheinsberg
Stage 2	Rheinsberg – Brandenburg an der Havel – Wittenberg and Dessau
Stage 3	Dessau – Duderstadt
Stage 4	Wittenberg – Moritzburg – Dresden –Plauen
Stage 5	Duderstadt and Plauen – Fulda
Stage 6	Fulda – Friedberg (Hesse) – Bad Nauheim – Limburg an der Lahn – Boppard – Kastellaun – Simmern/Hunsrück – Gemünden (Hunsrück) – Simmertal – Bad Sobernheim – Bad Kreuznach
Stage 7	Bad Kreuznach – Alzey – Gau-Odernheim – Hillesheim (Rheinhessen) – Dorn-Dürkheim – Kirchheim an der Weinstraße – Weisenheim am Berg – Karlsruhe – Ettlingen – Freudenstadt
Stage 8	Freudenstadt – Tübingen – Reutlingen – Gammertingen – Riedlingen – Bad Saulgau – Weingarten – Ravensburg – Markdorf – Meersburg – Konstanz – Reichenau Island
Stage 9	Höxter – Horn-Bad Meinberg – Detmold – Bad Lippspringe – Paderborn – Lippstadt – Soest – Möhnesee – Schwerte – Dortmund
Stage 10	Dortmund – Herdecke – Wetter – Schwelm – Radevormwald – Wupper Dam – Remscheid – Schloss Burg – Große Dhünn Dam – Altenberg Cathedral – Bechen – Bergisch Gladbach-Bensberg – Rösrath – Neunkirchen-Seelscheid – Siegburg – St. Augustin – Königswinter – Bad Honnef

== Gallery ==
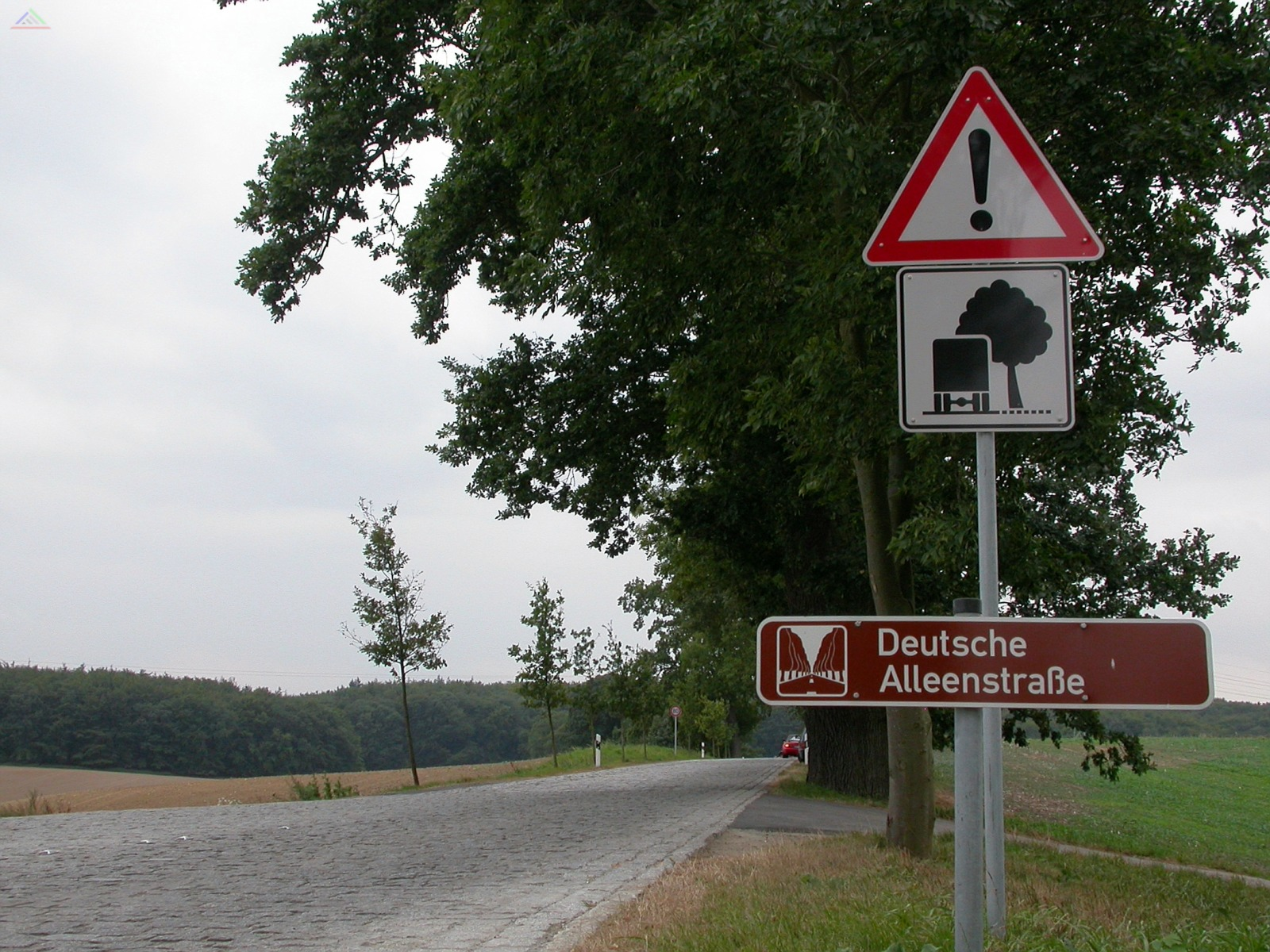
The German Avenue Road on the island of Rügen

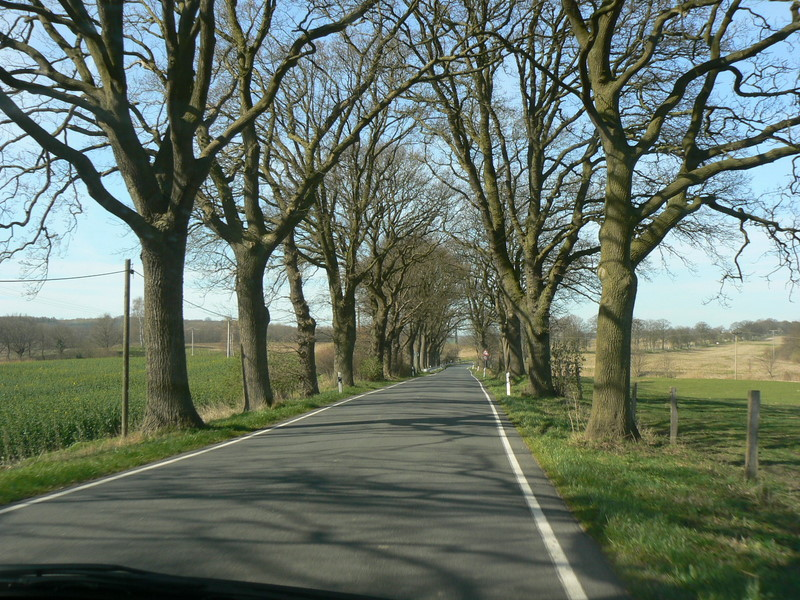
Avenue on Rügen near Putbus

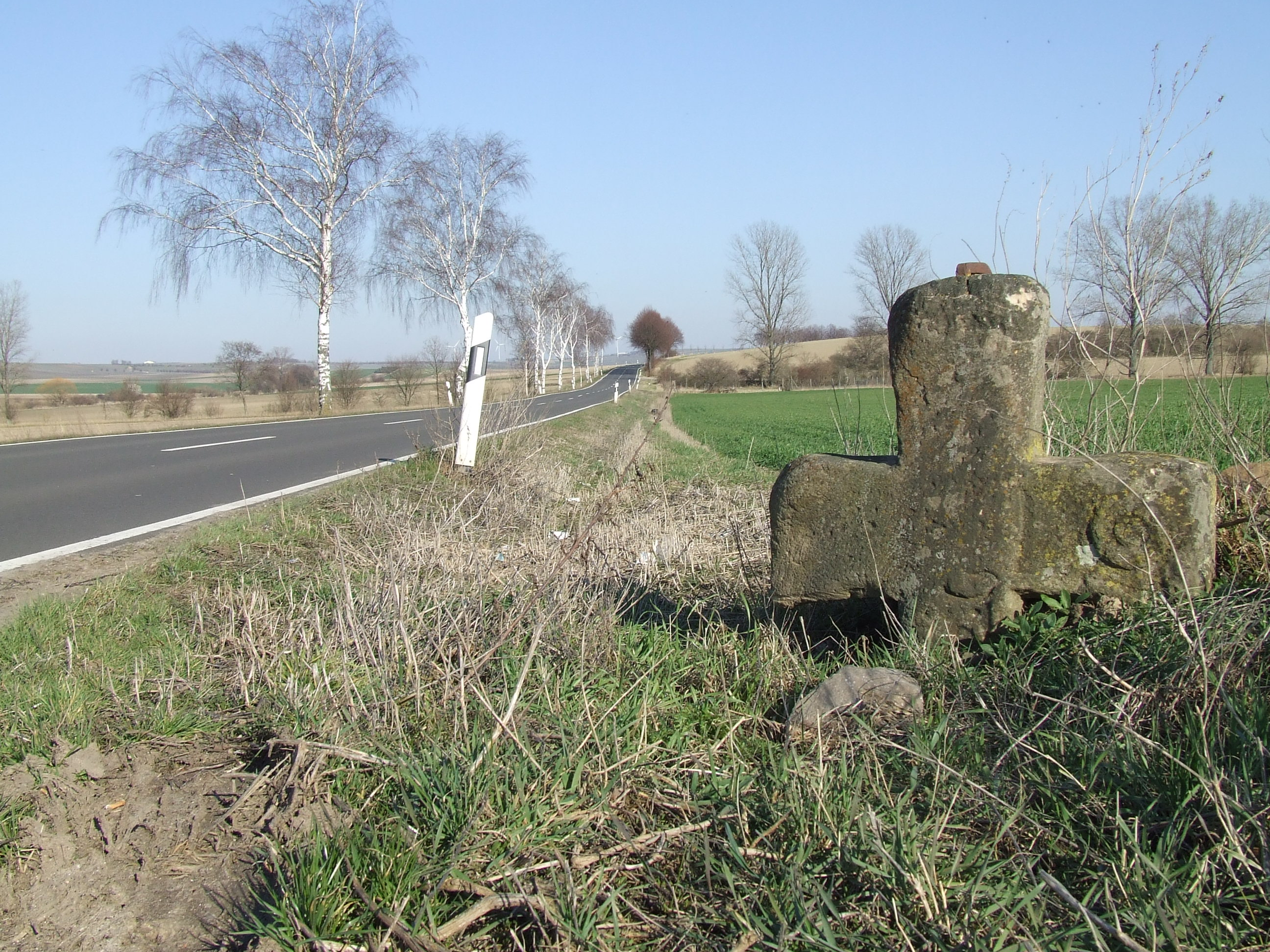
Ottenkreuz between Gau-Odernheim and Hillesheim

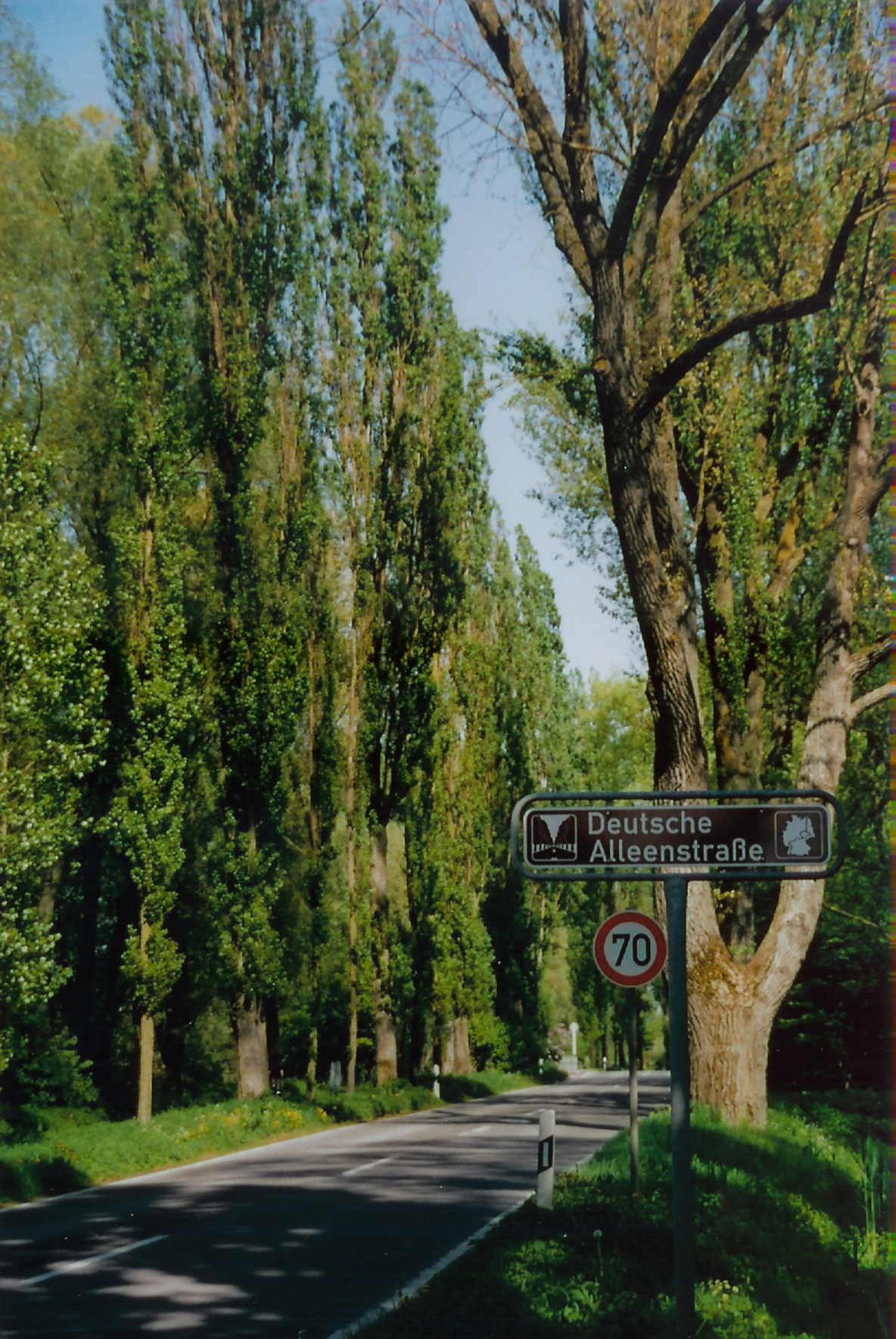
Reichenau Island

== Literature ==
- Arbeitsgemeinschaft Deutsche Alleenstraße (Hrsg.): Deutsche Alleenstraße – von Rügen bis zum Bodensee. WKP-Verlag, Freilassing 2001 (2nd ed.)
- Baedeker Allianz: Reiseführer Deutschland. Ein As im Ärmel. Verlag Mair-Dumont. November 2009. p. 131f. ISBN 978-3-8297-1186-9
- Thomas Billhardt, Günther Bellmann: Die Deutsche Alleenstraße. Zwischen Rügen und Rheinsberg. Ullstein, Berlin 1996. ISBN 3-550-06904-9
- Thomas Billhardt, Günther Bellmann: Die Deutsche Alleenstraße. Zwischen Rheinsberg und Wittenberg. Ullstein, Munich 2003 (5th ed.). ISBN 3-550-06887-5
- Ulf Böttcher, Wolfgang Hoffmann: Die deutsche Alleenstrasse – von der Insel Rügen bis zum Fläming. Mitteldeutscher Verlag, Halle 1995. ISBN 3-354-00857-1
