= Demmin =

Town in Mecklenburg-Vorpommern, Germany

- Town
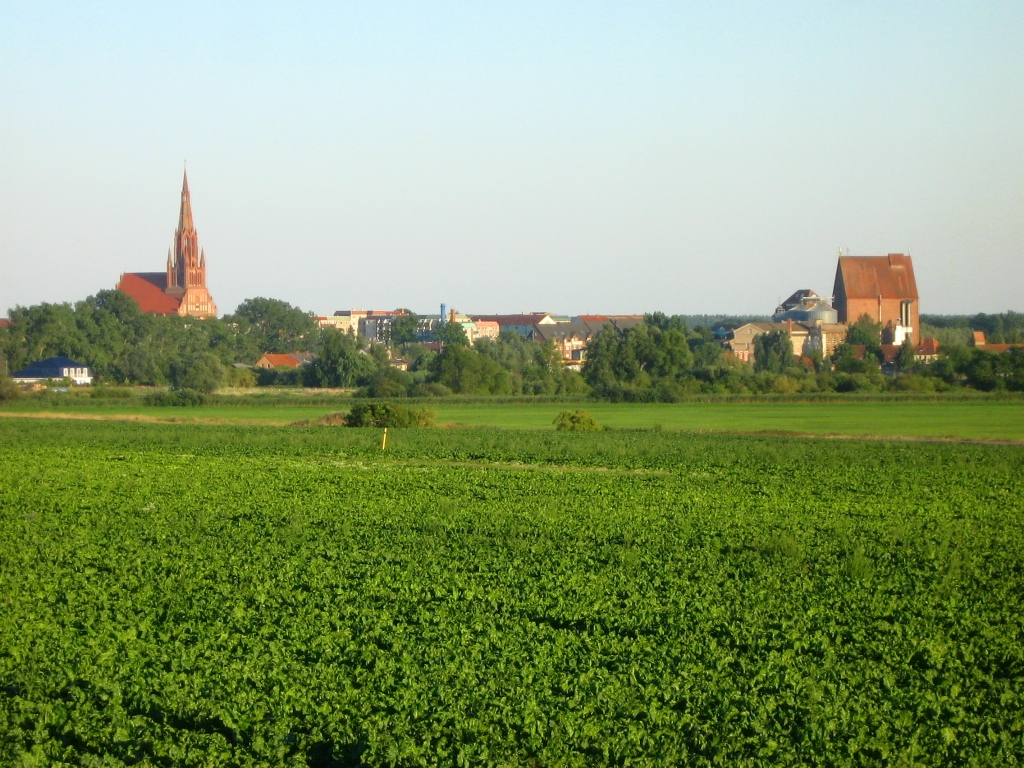

- Flag Coat of arms

- Location of Demmin within Mecklenburgische Seenplatte district
- Interactive map of Demmin
- Location within Germany Location within Mecklenburg-Vorpommern
- Coordinates: 53°54′18″N 13°02′38″E
- Country: Germany
- State: Mecklenburg-Vorpommern
- District: Mecklenburgische Seenplatte
- Subdivisions: 12 districts

Government
  - Mayor (2021–30): Thomas Witkowski (CDU)

Area
  - Total: 82.06 km^{2} (31.68 sq mi)
- Elevation: 8 m (26 ft)

Population (2025-12-31)
  - Total: 10,001
  - Density: 121.9/km^{2} (315.7/sq mi)
- Time zone: UTC+01:00 (CET)
  - Summer (DST): UTC+02:00 (CEST)
- Postal codes: 17109
- Dialling codes: 03998
- Vehicle registration: DM
- Website: www.demmin.de

Demmin (German pronunciation: [dɛˈmiːn]) is a town in the Mecklenburgische Seenplatte district, Mecklenburg-Western Pomerania, in north-eastern Germany. It was the capital of the former district of Demmin.

== Geography ==
Demmin lies on the West Pomeranian plain at the confluence of the rivers Peene, Tollense and Trebel. Lake Kummerow and the Szczecin Lagoon may be reached by boat on the Peene, Neubrandenburg via Altentreptow on by-roads and cycleways. The area of the confluences of the Tollense and Trebel with the Peene are called the Three Streams Land (Dreistromland) for tourist purposes and borrowing from the ancient land of Zweistromland.

North of Demmin is the Drosedow Forest and woods of Woldeforst (c. 174 ha.). Here is also the Kronwald Nature Reserv (103 ha.). To the west on the left bank of the Peene is the woodland area of Devener Holz and, on the left bank, Vorwerk Switzerland (Vorwerker Schweiz). To the east of the town are the Sandberg Pines and, to the southeast, the Vorwerk Forest.

=== Neighbouring towns and villages ===
To the north of the borough are Nossendorf and Loitz, to the east, Kletzin, Siedenbrünzow and Utzedel, to the south, Beggerow, Borrentin and Schönfeld and to the west, Warrenzin.

=== Subdivisions ===
The following villages also belong to Demmin: Deven, Drönnewitz, Erdmannshöhe, Karlshof, Lindenfelde, Randow, Seedorf (incorporated on 1 April 1942), Siebeneichen, Vorwerk, Waldberg, Woldeforst and Wotenick (incorporated on 1 June 2004).

Villages and populations

Village	12/2012	6/2013
Deven	38	38
Drönnewitz	218	215
Erdmannshöhe	13	13
Karlshof	14	11
Lindenfelde	65	66
Randow	104	98
Seedorf	93	91
Siebeneichen	12	13
Vorwerk	417	414
Waldberg	22	19
Woldeforst	1	2
Wotenick	210	211
Demmin (total)	11,650	11,574

== History ==
=== Name ===
The name may originate from the Slavic term timänie 'swampy area'. Another possible origin for the name Demmin could be from Old Polabian dym (plural: dyminy) 'smoke', referring to clearing land through burning to make settlement possible. In 1075, Adam of Bremen reported a fight over the castle at Dimine. In the course of history, the name changed, and sources refer to Dymine and Dimin, Latinized to Dyminium, finally Demmyn, and since 1320 the town has been known under its present spelling Demmin.

A popular explanation of the name, but without any historical basis, is as follows: two princesses built a castle called Haus Demmin and promised each other (in the Low German language spoken in Demmin) Dat Hus is din und min ('That house is thine [din] and mine [min]'). Thus the name of the castle and of the city is said to have developed.

=== Prehistory ===
As early as 5500 – 4900 BC, the Neolithic Linear Pottery culture spread from the East, and from the Oder river into the area east of Demmin. The great dolmen near Upost is classified as the easternmost great dolmen. As an evidence of the Funnelbeaker culture, 119 Megalith constructions bear witness around the county of Demmin. Of these, 56 are partially preserved. The majority of these constructions are 37 Dolmen The fact that there are also six simple dolmen preserved, makes Demmin and its surrounding area one of those regions in which the construction of such facilities had its roots. The later period is characterized by 12 preserved in the district of Demmin Tumulus and basin stones. From about 1800 BC on, the settlement of the area by Germanic peoples began.

=== Middle Ages ===
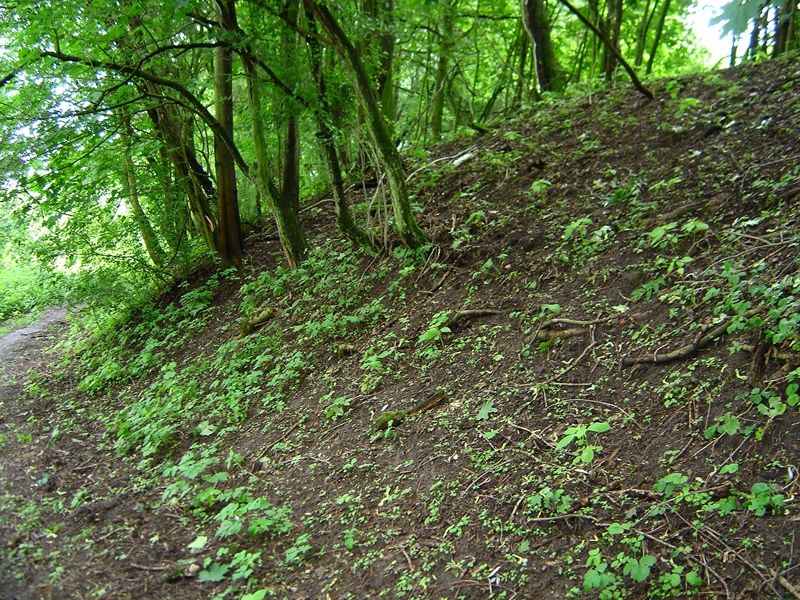
part of the defensive wall of the Slavic castle outside Haus Demmin

Slavic settlements of the Veleti in the forests surrounding Demmin can be traced back to the 8th century. In 789, during the Saxon wars, Charlemagne led his troops to the Peene river, against the Veleti who were allies of the Saxons. Dragovit, king of the Veleti, whose castle, civitas Dragowiti was said to most likely have been located at Vorwerk (Demmin), submitted to Charlemagne and swore fealty. The region was very suitable for a settlement and was important due to its location at the crossing of rivers and trade roads. During the struggle between the Veleti and the Franks, a border castle was erected by Lutici Circipanians at the dawn of the 10th century. That castle was later called "Haus Demmin". It controlled the Eastern parts of Circipania, a territory that stretched to Güstrow in the west. Its main castle was Teterow.

Demmin was a stronghold of the West Slav Circipanes during the Middle Ages. Due to its strategical importance, strongholds were erected (and often attacked and destroyed) at the Vorwerk and Haus Demmin sites, named Dimin or Dymin. In the early 12th century Polish monarch Bolesław III Wrymouth, who established sovereignty over Pomerania, initiated Christianization, entrusting this task to Otto of Bamberg, who visited Dymin in 1127. The inhabitants accepted Christianity, and a church was founded in 1140. A Saxon army unsuccessfully besieged the settlement during the 1147 Wendish Crusade. In 1160, Dymin became the capital of a small eponymous duchy. In 1164, it was captured by Henry the Lion. It was soon rebuilt, and in 1177 it was successfully defended during another siege by Henry the Lion. In 1211 it was captured by King Valdemar II of Denmark, who retained it until 1227. In 1264, it was reunited with the Duchy of Pomerania.

It was granted municipal rights in the 13th century, confirmed by Dukes Bogislaw IV, Barnim II and Otto I in 1292, along with its old privileges. It was colonized by Germans and Flemings by the 13th to 14th centuries. Following the division of the Duchy of Pomerania in 1295, the town passed to the Wolgast dukes and the castle passed to the Szczecin dukes. In 1326 Duke Otto I granted all merchants coming to the town exemption from customs duties and taxes in the area. In 1327 it was unsuccessfully besieged by Mecklenburg during the Wars of the Rügen Succession. From 1478 Demmin was part of the reunited Duchy of Pomerania.

=== Modern Age ===
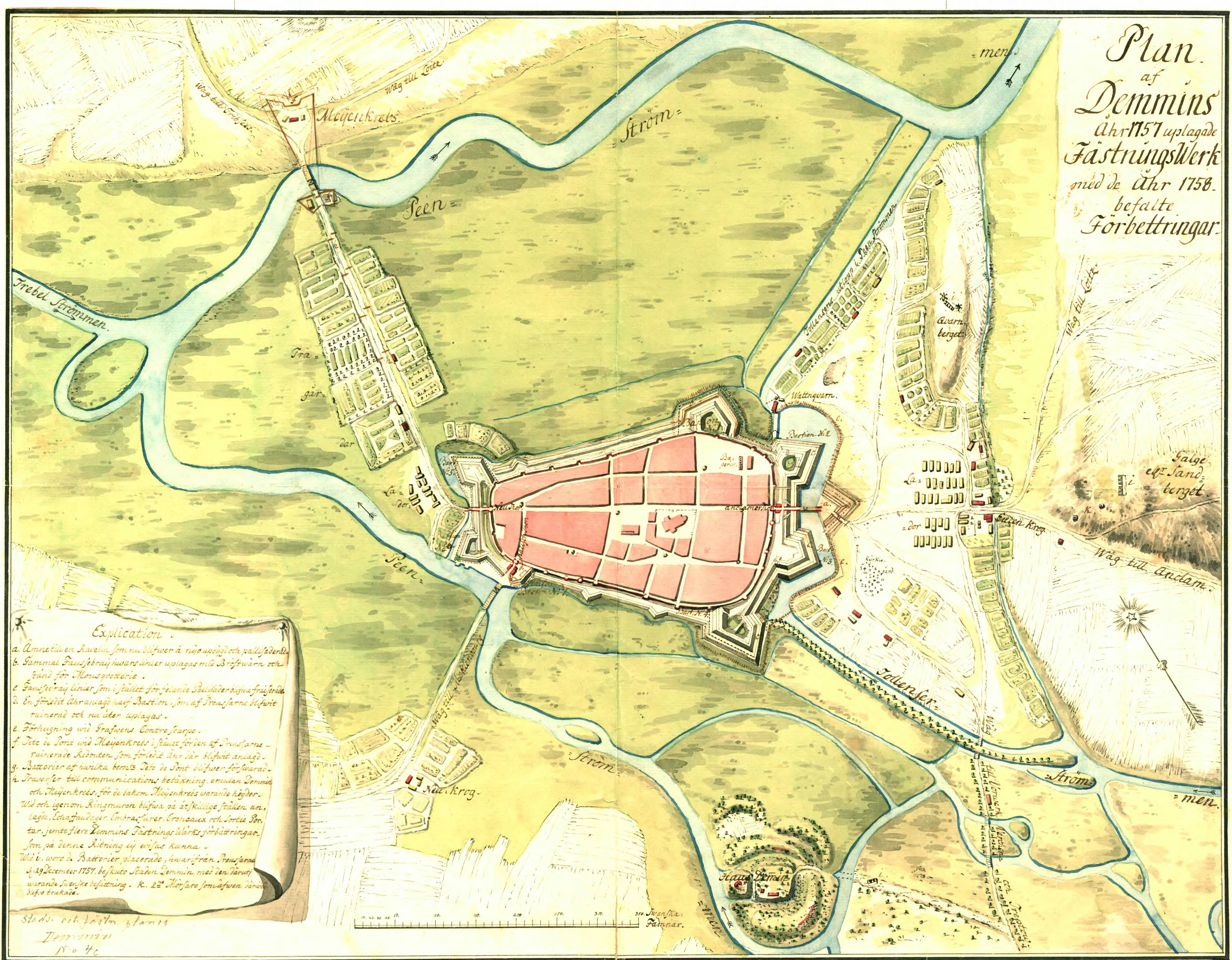
Map of Haus Demin (lower part of the map), 1758

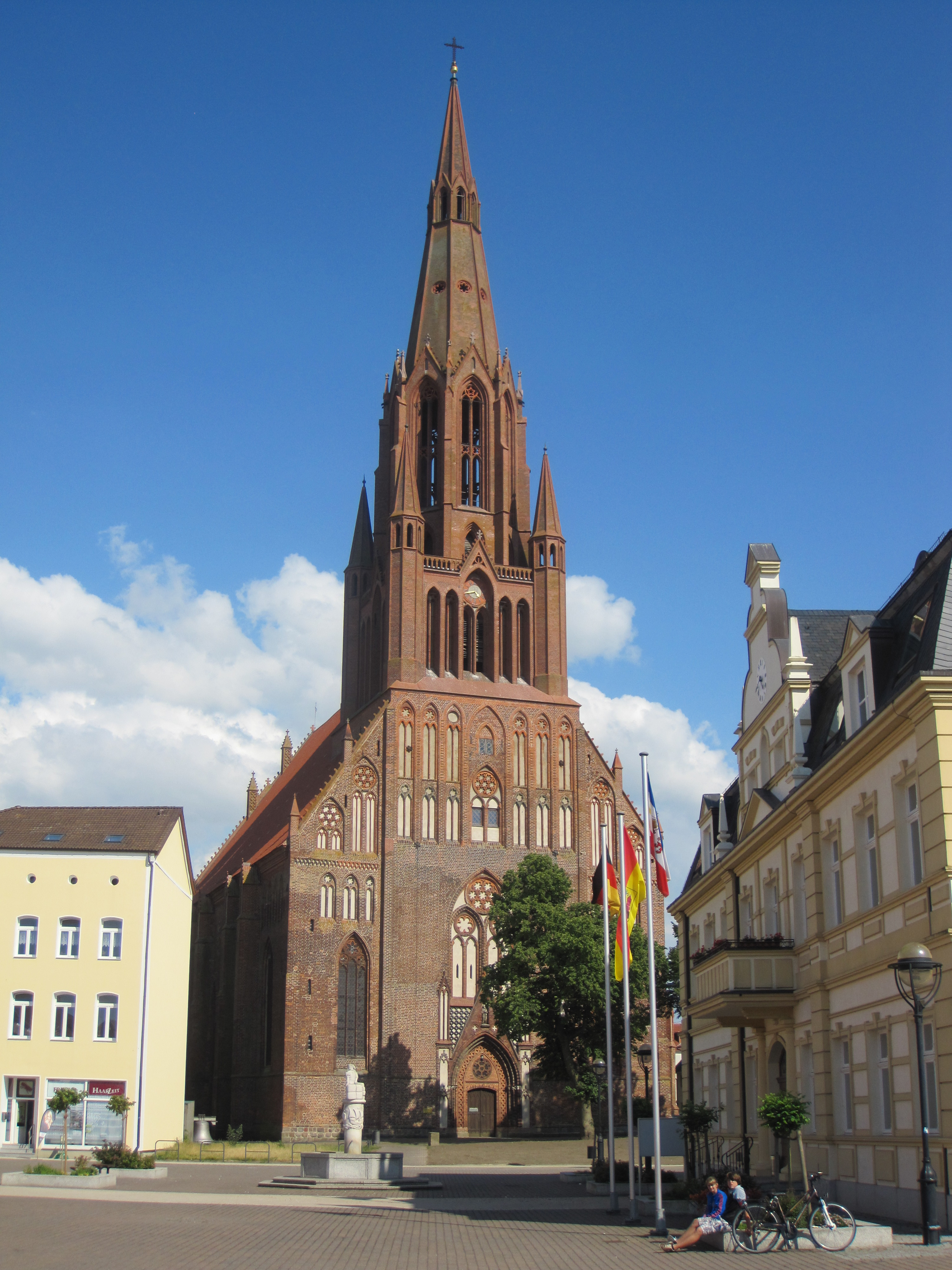
St Bartholomew's Church

Like most of Pomeranian areas aside the larger coastal Hanse cities, the character of Demmin and its surrounding areas remained rural and dominated by agriculture until today, even though Demmin had been a member of the Hanseatic League because of the rivers (e.g. the Peene River) connecting this area to the Baltic coast.

During the Thirty Years' War, Demmin was occupied by imperial forces from 1627 to 1630, and thereafter by Swedish forces. From 1648, Demmin was part of Swedish Pomerania. From 1720, it was part of Prussia, within which it was administratively located in the Province of Pomerania. In 1807 it was briefly occupied by France. In the late 19th century the inhabitants were mainly employed in weaving, tanning, fishing and trade.

In the Weimar Republic Demmin was a stronghold of the nationalistic organisations DNVP and the Stahlhelm. Even before 1933 there were boycotts of Jewish businesses, which drove away most of the Jews and the synagogue was sold in June 1938 to a furniture company, which is why it survives as a building today. In the last free national elections to the Reichstag on 5 March 1933 the National Socialist Party won 53.7 percent of votes in Demmin. On 11 November 1938, thousands gathered in the square in an anti-Semitic demonstration as part of Kristallnacht.

During World War II, Poles, Russians, as well as POWs from France and Belgium were used as forced labour in the town.

German troops destroyed the bridges over the Peene while retreating from Demmin during World War II. This way, the advance of the Soviet Red Army was slowed down when they arrived in Demmin on 30 April 1945. During that night and the following morning, Demmin was handed over to the Red Army largely without fighting, similar to other cities like Greifswald. Rapes, pillage and executions committed by Red Army soldiers triggered a mass suicide of hundreds of people and nearly all of the Old Town was burned down by the Red Army. From 1945 to 1952, Demmin was part of the State of Mecklenburg-Vorpommern, from 1952 to 1990 of the Bezirk Neubrandenburg of East Germany and since 1990 again of Mecklenburg-Vorpommern.

== Coat of arms ==
The coat of arms of Demmin displays:

- a red fortress with three open gates
- the two towers are topped by a silver lily
- a leaned to the right silver shield displaying a
- red griffin is the heraldic animal of Pomerania
- On top of the shield there is a crowned, blue helmet with green peacock feathers
- The red fortress symbolizes the city's history as the residency of Pomeranian princes
- The lily crowning both towers symbolizes the city flower used in the 18th century.

== Notable residents ==
- Joachim Lütkemann (1608–1655), Lutheran theologian and writer of devotional literature.
- Heinrich Carl von Schimmelmann (1724–1782), merchant, banker, nobleman, planter and politician.
- Julius Friedrich Cohnheim (1839–1884), pathologist
- Hans Joachim von Rohr (1888–1971), politician
- Enrico Schult (born 1979), politician

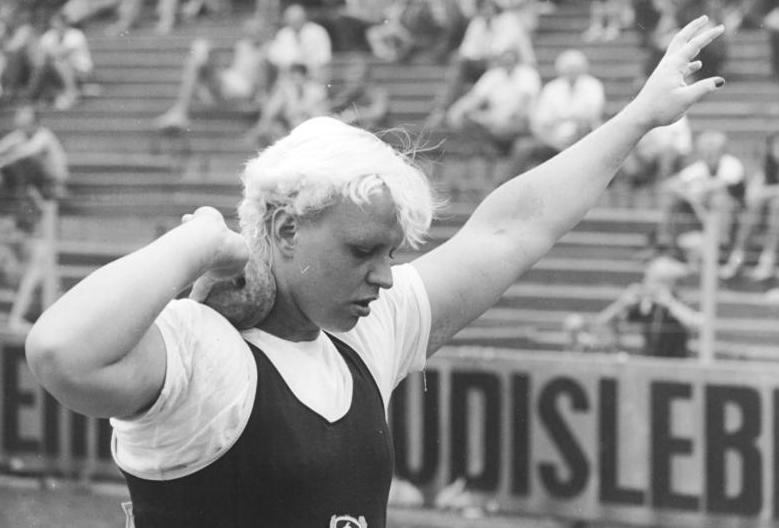
Ilona Slupianek, 1981

=== Sport ===
- Otto Kuchenbecker (1907–1990), basketball player
- Ilona Slupianek (born 1956), shot putter, gold medallist at the 1980 Summer Olympics
- Ellen Fiedler (born 1958), hurdler, bronze medallist at the 1988 Summer Olympics
- Axel Wegner (born 1963), sport shooter, gold medallist at the 1988 Summer Olympics
- Torsten Krentz (born 1966), sprint canoeist
- Stefan Uteß (born 1974), sprint canoer, team bronze medallist at the 2000 Summer Olympics
- Heike Fischer (born 1982), diver. team bronze medallist at the 2008 Summer Olympics
