= Battle of Verchen =

1164 battle

Coordinates: 53°51′N 12°54′E

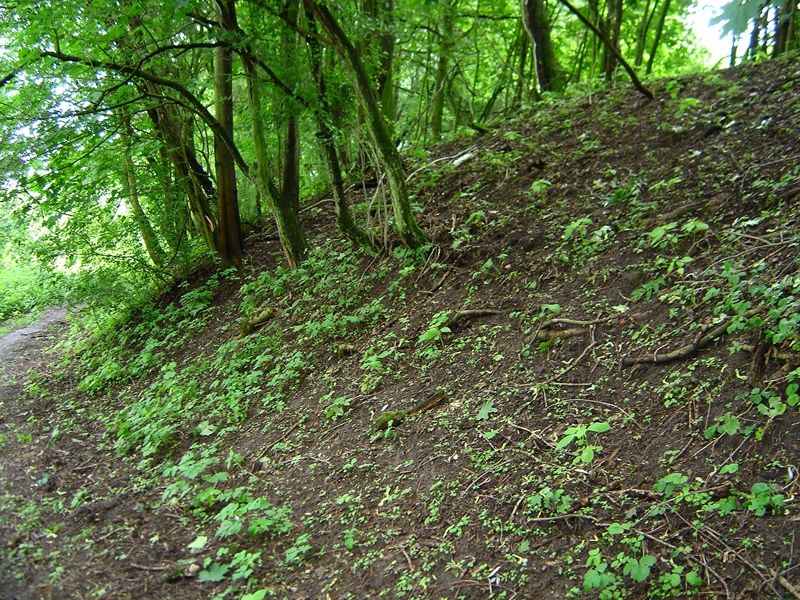
Battle of Verchen

The Battle of Verchen (German: Schlacht bei Verchen) was a battle between Saxons and West Slavic Obotrites on 6 July 1164.

The Obotrites were attacked by Saxons and Danes in 1160, resulting in the death of the Obotrite prince, Niklot, and the partition of the Obotrite lands. Niklot's son Pribislav rose in revolt in 1163, capturing the castles of Malchow and Quetzin.

The army of Duke Henry the Lion of Saxony was concentrated at Verchen near Demmin and consisted of troops from Saxony, Holstein, Dithmarschen, and Frisia. The Christian army was also assisted by a fleet from King Valdemar the Great of Denmark. They were opposed by a force of Slavs led by Pribislav and the Pomeranian dukes Bogislaw I and Casimir I.

The outcome of the resulting bloody battle with the Slavs was in doubt, although the Christian lords were eventually victorious. Slavic casualties amounted to 2,500, while the Saxon Count of Holstein, Adolf II, fell in battle along with 450 Saxons.

The land of the Obotrites was ravaged by the campaign and many inhabitants, including Pribislav, fled to Pomerania.
