= Demminer Chants =

2023 film by Hans-Jürgen Syberberg

- Directed by: Hans-Jürgen Syberberg
- Written by: Hans-Jürgen Syberberg
- Edited by: Hans-Jürgen Syberberg
- Production company: Syberberg Filmproduktion
- Distributed by: Filmgalerie 451
- Release dates: 17 June 2023 (Demmin); 7 December 2023
- Running time: 214 minutes
- Country: Germany
- Language: German

Demminer Chants (German: Demminer Gesänge) is a 2023 German documentary film directed by Hans-Jürgen Syberberg. It is about the town of Demmin where Syberberg grew up and his long-time work to revitalise its central square. It was the first film Syberberg made in 25 years.

== Synopsis ==
Over three hours, Hans-Jürgen Syberberg presents the town of Demmin in north-eastern Germany. He grew up in Nossendorf, ten kilometers north of the town, where his father was the Gutsherr. He moved back to Demmin in the early 1990s. He interweaves his personal connections to the place with its history. At the end of World War II, there was a mass suicide in the town where at least 1000 women children took their lives, right before the Red Army reached them and burned down the town. Syberberg was nine at the time and saw the town burn from a distance. The event left a trauma in the post-war period, when raping and pillaging of the Soviet Union were forbidden subjects in East Germany. Forty years later, only Neo-Nazis addressed this part of German history and there have been attempts to criminalise any descriptions of Germans victimhood.

Since the 1990s, Syberberg has made attempts to reestablish the communal role of Demmin's central market square. One of his projects has been to set up a film café. Two architecture firms have submitted proposals for how the square's communal function can be improved. The film goes into urban planning and the future of local communities in general. It goes into the relationship between commerce and a thriving community and Syberberg describes his programme as "not just buying, but also being".

== Production ==
Syberberg had emerged as part of the New German Cinema and made an impact with often divisive films about subject such as Adolf Hitler, Winifred Wagner and Ludwig II of Bavaria. Demminer Chants was Syberberg's first film project in 25 years. He wrote, directed and edited the film through his company Syberberg Filmproduktion. The production received funding from the Kulturelle Filmförderung Mecklenburg-Vorpommern and the Bayerischer Rundfunk. Production took place from 2017 to 2023.

== Release ==
Demminer Chants had its world premiere at Demmin's market square on 17 June 2023. Filmgalerie 451 handled distribution in Germany from 7 December 2023. Syberberg gave an introduction and interview to a screening in Munich on 17 December 2023. The film was submitted to the Berlin International Film Festival but rejected.

== Reception ==
Jan Brachmann of the Frankfurter Allgemeine Zeitung wrote that Demminer Chants combines deliberately amateurish "Internet diary" footage with photos, spoken commentary and music that works as "a polyphonic collage". He connected the non-professional form to Syberberg's stated goal to avoid turning the town into a commodity. Bachmann wrote it was strange the film had been rejected by the Berlin International Film Festival and called Syberberg "one of the most important filmmakers of the last half century".
