= Demmin-Land =

Amt in Mecklenburg-Vorpommern, Germany

- Amt
- Map of Mecklenburgische Seenplatte highlighting Demmin-Land
- Interactive map of Demmin-Land
- Location within Germany Location within Mecklenburg-Vorpommern
- Coordinates: 53°49′N 12°58′E
- Country: Germany
- State: Mecklenburg-Vorpommern
- District: Mecklenburgische Seenplatte
- Seat: Demmin
- Subdivisions: 16 municipalities

Area
  - Total: 361.03 km^{2} (139.39 sq mi)

Population (2025-12-31)
  - Total: 6,479
  - Density: 17.95/km^{2} (46.48/sq mi)
- Time zone: UTC+01:00 (CET)
  - Summer (DST): UTC+02:00 (CEST)
- Website: www.amt-demmin-land.de

Demmin-Land is an Amt in the Mecklenburgische Seenplatte district, in Mecklenburg-Vorpommern, Germany. The seat of the Amt is in Demmin, itself not part of the Amt.

The Amt Demmin-Land consists of the following municipalities:

1. Beggerow
2. Borrentin
3. Hohenbollentin
4. Hohenmocker
5. Kentzlin
6. Kletzin
7. Lindenberg
8. Meesiger
9. Nossendorf
10. Sarow
11. Schönfeld
12. Siedenbrünzow
13. Sommersdorf
14. Utzedel
15. Verchen
16. Warrenzin
