= Reiner Goldberg =

German opera singer (1939–2023)

- Goldberg in Die Walküre, 1986
- Born: 17 October 1939; Crostau, Gau Saxony, German Reich
- Died: 7 October 2023 (aged 83); Berlin, Germany
- Education: Hochschule für Musik Carl Maria von Weber
- Occupation: Heldentenor
- Organizations: Berlin State Opera; Bayreuth Festival

Reiner Goldberg (17 October 1939 – 7 October 2023) was a German operatic heldentenor who made an international career performing and recording. He appeared at the Berlin State Opera from 1972, and was a member of the ensemble from 1981. Goldberg achieved attention when he sang the role of Wagner's Parsifal for a 1982 opera film directed by Hans-Jürgen Syberberg. He then became known for performing the tenor roles of Wagner's stage works in leading opera houses in Europe and worldwide, such as the Bayreuth Festival where he appeared from 1986 as Tannhäuser, Stolzing in Die Meistersinger von Nürnberg, Siegfried in both Siegfried and Götterdämmerung, and Erik in Der fliegende Holländer. He performed at the Metropolitan Opera as Siegfried, conducted by James Levine and alongside Hildegard Behrens as Brünnhilde, resulting in a recording that won a Grammy Award.

Goldberg worked in contemporary opera, such as the iconic production of Schoenberg's Moses und Aron at the Dresden State Opera in 1975, directed by Harry Kupfer and conducted by Herbert Kegel.

== Life and career ==
Reiner Goldberg was born in Crostau, Upper Lusatia, on 17 October 1939; his father, Fritz Goldberg, was a master weaver. The boy played trumpet and French horn. He first trained as a locksmith. He was first exposed to opera in 1955, attending a performance of Mozart's Don Giovanni at the Sächsische Staatsoper Dresden, with Arno Schellenberg in the title role. Arriving too late for the last train home, he had to spend the night at the station. After his voice was discovered when he performed at a private birthday celebration, he studied singing at the Hochschule für Musik Carl Maria von Weber in Dresden with Schellenberg. Goldberg made his debut in 1966 at the Sächsische Landesbühne in Radebeul in a small role in Mozart's Die Zauberflöte, and later appeared there as Luigi in Puccini's Il tabarro. Beginning in 1969, he performed regularly at the Staatsoper Dresden and became a member in 1973.

=== Berlin State Opera ===
Goldberg performed at the Berlin State Opera from 1972, and in the world premiere of Ernst Hermann Meyer's Reiter in der Nacht in 1973. Appearing in the politically important opera gave him exemption from military service. He became an ensemble member in Berlin in 1981. His roles at the house included Beethoven's Fidelio; Weber's Max in Der Freischütz and Hüon in Oberon; Wagner's Tannhäuser; Lohengrin, Erik, and Stolzing in Die Meistersinger von Nürnberg; Siegfried and Parsifal; Gounod's Faust; Don José in Bizet's Carmen; Alfredo in Verdi's La traviata; Hermann in Tchaikovsky's Pique Dame; Sergei in Shostakovitch's Katerina Ismailowa; Stewa in Janáčeks Jenufa; and Pedro in d'Alberts Tiefland. His roles in Richard Strauss' operas included Bacchus in Ariadne auf Naxos; the Emperor in Die Frau ohne Schatten; Herod in Salome; and Ägisth in Elektra. His 20th-century repertoire included the Drum Major in Berg's Wozzeck; Aron in Schönberg's Moses und Aron in 1975, directed by Harry Kupfer; and the title role of Dessau's Die Verurteilung des Lukullus.

=== Guest performances ===
Goldberg sang as a guest, first in the East, such as at the Oper Leipzig and the Kirov Theatre in Leningrad, and to Japan. He became increasingly in demand in the West, at Italian opera houses, at the Hamburg State Opera as Bacchus in Ariadne auf Naxos, at the Bavarian State Opera as Stolzing in Die Meistersinger, with the Dresden opera on tour in Paris, performing Wozzeck in 1973, and in a 1982 Paris concert performance of Die Liebe der Danae by Richard Strauss as Apollo. He also performed as Stolzing for his debut with the Royal Opera House in London in 1982, and appeared as Florestan in Fidelio at the Salzburg Festival the same year, alongside Éva Marton in the title role, and conducted by Lorin Maazel. Goldberg performed as Erik in Der fliegende Holländer at the Salzburg Easter Festival in 1982 and 1983, conducted by Herbert von Karajan. He performed in Guntram, an early opera by Richard Strauss, in a 1983 concert performance in New York City, as Tannhäuser at La Scala in Milan in 1984, and as Siegfried at the Liceo in 1985.

=== Bayreuth Festival ===
Goldberg was first invited to the Bayreuth Festival to sing Siegfried in both Siegfried and Götterdämmerung in the 1983 new Ring cycle conducted by Georg Solti and directed by Peter Hall, having auditioned with Solti and Wolfgang Wagner. During rehearsals, Hall was not satisfied, and he was replaced shortly before the first performances; both indisposition and misunderstanding the English director may have played a role. In 1986 Goldberg was invited by Wolfgang Wagner to perform Tannhäuser on short notice. He returned for Stolzing in Die Meistersinger in 1987, and in 1988 Stolzing again and Siegfried in Götterdämmerung. In 1989 he appeared as Siegfried both in Siegfried and Götterdämmerung in the second Ring cycle of that summer's festival, staged by Kupfer and conducted by Daniel Barenboim. From 1990 to 1994, he performed each year as Erik, conducted by Giuseppe Sinopoli.

Goldberg appeared as Max at the Grand Théâtre de Genève in 1988, and as Pedro in d'Albert's Tiefland from 1991. He performed at the Metropolitan Opera in New York City in the Ring cycle of 1991/92, conducted by James Levine, and alongside Hildegard Behrens as Brünnhilde and James Morris as Wotan.

=== Later years ===
In 2001, Goldberg learned the title role of Britten's Peter Grimes phonetically for a production at the Oper Graz, as he did not speak English. He reprised the role of Aron in 2004 in Hamburg in a new production directed by Peter Konwitschny and conducted by Ingo Metzmacher. Jürgen Kesting from the FAZ wrote that "he still sings the role gloriously: with the beautiful tone demanded by Schönberg, good connections and smooth transitions, overcoming expressive resistances especially in moments of highest tension, sometimes with refined parlando. In the seduction scene, he succeeds in making the ambiguity of the demagogic text perceptible in the iridescence of the tone".

At age 61, he appeared as the Emperor in Die Frau ohne Schatten with great success. He continued to sing with the Berlin State Opera, taking significant comprimario roles in Elektra and Salome up until 2015. Also in 2015, Barenboim had the idea of casting great Wagner singers of previous years as the various Masters in Die Meistersinger von Nürnberg; Goldberg performed as Eisslinger, and reprised it in 2019, alongside Franz Mazura as Schwarz, at age 95. He sang the role of the first prisoner in Fidelio in a production in Graz in 2020 at age 80.

In concert, Goldberg sang the tenor solo in Beethoven's Ninth Symphony at the Edinburgh Festival, with the Berlin Philharmonic conducted by Claudio Abbado. In 1995, Goldberg received the Special Music Award for the title role of Aron in a live recording of Moses und Aron with the Tokyo Symphony, conducted by Kazuyoshi Akiyama at Suntory Hall in Tokyo. He was named honorary member of the Berlin State Opera in 2019.

Goldberg died in Berlin on 7 October 2023, at age 83.

== Recordings ==
Goldberg achieved attention when he sang the role of Wagner's Parsifal for a 1982 opera film directed by Hans-Jürgen Syberberg, while two actor perform the action; his singing was described as "with a youthful radiance that is precisely that of the chaste madman", conducted by Armin Jordan.

Goldberg's sound recordings include:

- Schoenberg: Moses und Aron / 1976 / Rundfunk-Sinfonie-Orchester Leipzig conducted by Herbert Kegel / soloists: Werner Haseleu, Goldberg
- Mahler: Das Lied von der Erde / Weitblick 1977 / Rundfunk-Sinfonie-Orchester Leipzig conducted by Kegel / soloists: Věra Soukupová, Goldberg
- Wagner: Parsifal / Erato 1982 / Monte-Carlo Philharmonic Orchestra conducted by Armin Jordan / soloists: Goldberg, Wolfgang Schöne, R. Lloyd, Yvonne Minton
- R. Strauss: Daphne / EMI 1983, 1988 / Bavarian Radio Symphony Orchestra conducted by Bernard Haitink / soloists: Lucia Popp, Goldberg as Apollo, Kurt Moll
- R. Strauss: Guntram / Hungaroton 1985 / Hungarian National Philharmonic conducted by Eve Queler / soloists: Goldberg, Ilona Tokody, István Gáti
- Wagner: Die Walküre / EMI 1988 / Bavarian Radio Symphony Orchestra conducted by Haitink / soloists: Goldberg, Éva Marton, Cheryl Studer, Waltraud Meier, James Morris
- Beethoven: Fidelio / Philipps 1989 / Jessye Norman, Staatskapelle Dresden, Haitink
- Wagner: Siegfried / Deutsche Grammophon 1991 / Metropolitan Opera Orchestra conducted by James Levine / soloists: Goldberg, Morris, Hildegard Behrens, Heinz Zednik
- Wagner: Götterdämmerung / Deutsche Grammophon 1991 / Metropolitan Opera Orchestra conducted by Levine / soloists: Goldberg, Behrens, Hanna Schwarz, Studer, Bernd Weikl

Goldberg appeared as Florestan in a recording from Dresden around the Fall of the Berlin Wall, with Jessye Norman in the title role, and Bernard Haitink conducting. The recording of Götterdämmerung from the Metropolitan Opera received the Grammy Award for Opera recording of the year 1992.
