= Sex-Business: Made in Pasing =

- Directed by: Hans-Jürgen Syberberg
- Produced by: Hans-Jürgen Syberberg
- Starring: Alois Brummer
- Cinematography: Christian Blackwood
- Production company: TMS Film
- Release date: 3 January 1970
- Running time: 96 minutes
- Country: West Germany
- Language: German

Sex-Business: Made in Pasing is a 1970 West German documentary film directed by Hans-Jürgen Syberberg. It focuses on Alois Brummer, a Bavarian producer of pornographic comedies and sexploitation films. The film was shot in July 1970 in Pasing, Oberaudorf. It had a budget of 30,000 DM.

The film premiered on 3 January 1970 at the Occam Studio für Filmkunst in Munich. It was broadcast on ARD on 23 March 1970. It received the Filmband in Silber, the second-place prize, for Best Documentary Feature Film at the Deutscher Filmpreis 1970. The Münchner Anstalt gave the film an honorarium of 40,000 DM.

== See also ==
- Bavarian porn
