= A Dream, What Else? =

- Directed by: Hans-Jürgen Syberberg
- Written by: Hans-Jürgen Syberberg
- Produced by: Kurt Liewehr; Herbert Machart
- Starring: Edith Clever
- Cinematography: Dieter Gessl
- Edited by: Michael Trnka
- Production company: TMS Film
- Release date: 17 February 1995
- Running time: 132 minutes
- Countries: Austria; Germany
- Language: German

A Dream, What Else? (German: Ein Traum, was sonst?) is a 1995 Austrian-German drama film written and directed by Hans-Jürgen Syberberg. It stars Edith Clever as Sybille von Bismarck, the daughter-in-law of Otto von Bismarck.

== Plot ==
The film consists of a monologue where the main character, aged and widowed, mourns the defeat of Prussia at the end of World War II. She recites from The Trojan Women by Euripides, The Prince of Homburg by Heinrich von Kleist and Faust: Part II (1832) by Johann Wolfgang von Goethe.

== Production ==
The monologue was first performed on stage in Berlin in 1990 and toured several countries during the following years. The film was shot in the summer 1994 at Szene-Theater in Salzburg, Austria, for Szene Salzburg and ORF. It was produced through Syberberg's German company TMS Film.
