= On the Fortunes and Misfortunes of Art in Post-War Germany =

1990 essay by Hans-Jürgen Syberberg

- Author: Hans-Jürgen Syberberg
- Original title: Vom Unglück und Glück der Kunst in Deutschland nach dem letzten Kriege
- Language: German
- Publisher: Matthes & Seitz
- Publication date: 1990
- Publication place: Germany
- English publication date: 2017
- Pages: 199
- ISBN: 978-3882217612

On the Fortunes and Misfortunes of Art in Post-War Germany (German: Vom Unglück und Glück der Kunst in Deutschland nach dem letzten Kriege) is a 1990 book-length essay by the German writer and filmmaker Hans-Jürgen Syberberg.

An English translation was published in 2017 by far-right Arktos Media.

== Summary ==
Syberberg criticises the German post-war culture, and argues that Germans need to revive the cultural expressions found in the works of artists such as Richard Wagner, Friedrich Hölderlin and Heinrich von Kleist, an aesthetic tradition which to a large extent has been expulsed from public life since 1945. He argues that the current cultural establishment is dominated by leftists and Jews, who use World War II and the Holocaust in order to ostracise important parts of the German cultural heritage.

== Reception ==
The book gave rise to an infected debate in German newspapers, known as the "Syberberg debate", which lasted throughout the summer and autumn of 1990. The liberal press was highly critical of the book and Syberberg's opinions. Hellmuth Karasek of Der Spiegel reviewed the book under the heading "Neo-Nazism" and condemned both Syberberg as a person and his oeuvre in its entirety. In Frankfurter Allgemeine Zeitung, Werner Fuld described the essay as a "frontal attack against democracy and art".

Although critical of the views presented in the book, Susan Sontag and other critics who in the past had praised Syberberg continued to defend his films as great and important works of art.
