= Verchen =

- Municipality
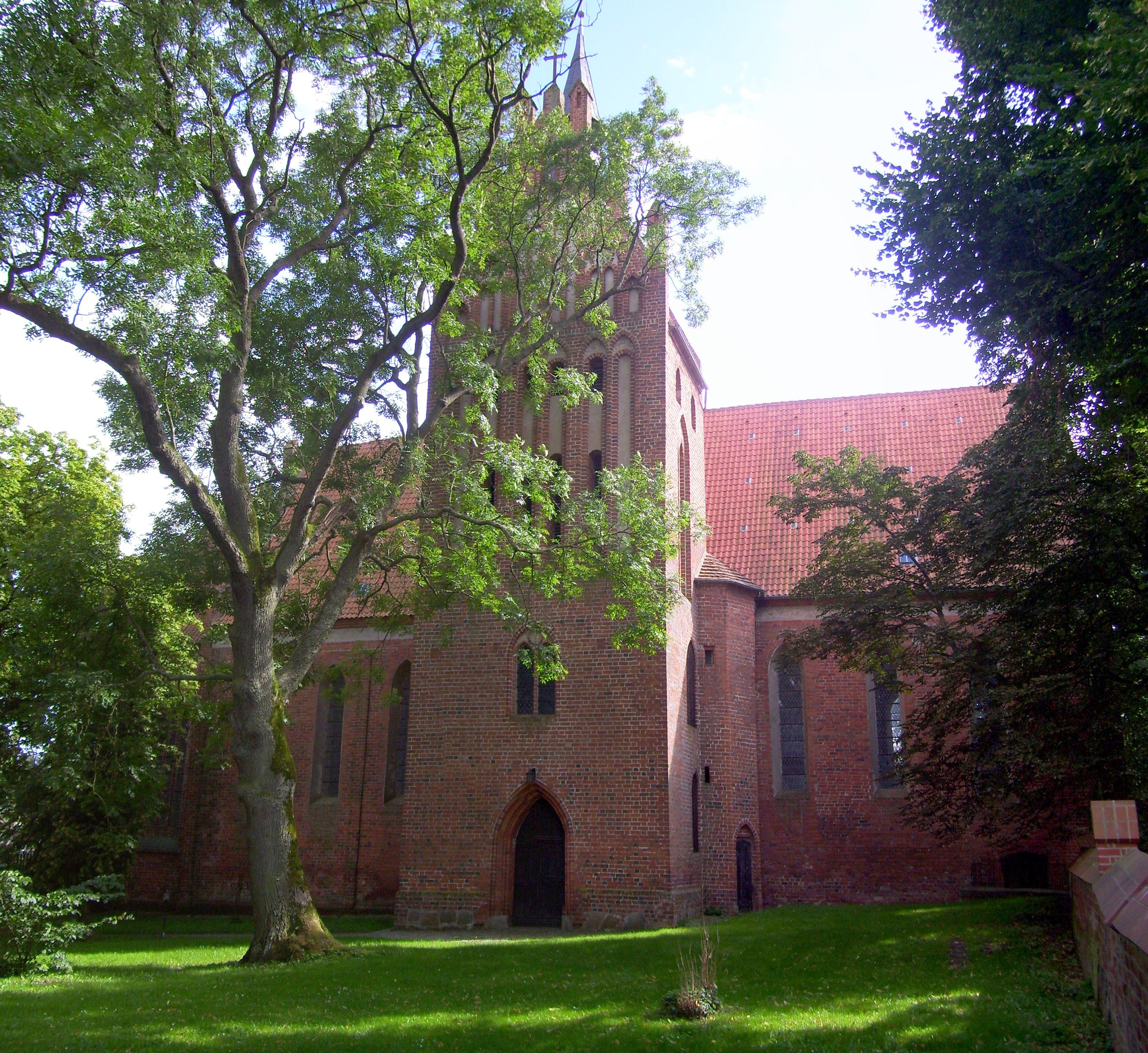
- Klosterkirche Verchen in Verchen

- Location of Verchen within Mecklenburgische Seenplatte district
- Interactive map of Verchen
- Location within Germany Location within Mecklenburg-Vorpommern
- Coordinates: 53°51′N 12°54′E
- Country: Germany
- State: Mecklenburg-Vorpommern
- District: Mecklenburgische Seenplatte
- Municipal assoc.: Demmin-Land

Government
  - Mayor: Petra Kasch

Area
  - Total: 11.68 km^{2} (4.51 sq mi)
- Elevation: 1 m (3.3 ft)

Population (2025-12-31)
  - Total: 386
  - Density: 33.0/km^{2} (85.6/sq mi)
- Time zone: UTC+01:00 (CET)
  - Summer (DST): UTC+02:00 (CEST)
- Postal codes: 17111
- Dialling codes: 039994
- Vehicle registration: DM
- Website: www.amt-demmin-land.de

Verchen is a municipality in the Mecklenburgische Seenplatte district, in Mecklenburg-Vorpommern, Germany. The Battle of Verchen occurred nearby in 1164.
