= Parsifal (1982 film) =

1982 film

- Film poster
- Directed by: Hans-Jürgen Syberberg
- Written by: Richard Wagner
- Produced by: Annie Nap-Oleon
- Starring: Armin Jordan
- Cinematography: Igor Luther
- Edited by: Jutta Brandstaedter; Marianne Fehrenberg
- Distributed by: Zoetrope Studios
- Release date: May 1982
- Running time: 255 minutes
- Countries: West Germany; France
- Language: German

Parsifal is a 1982 West German-French opera film directed by Hans-Jürgen Syberberg, based on the opera of the same name by Richard Wagner. It was shown out of competition at the 1982 Cannes Film Festival and ranks No. 8 in Cahiers du Cinéma's Annual Top 10 Lists in 1982.

== Summary ==
The soundtrack is a complete performance of the opera, but the imagery used is a melange including medieval costume, puppetry, Nazi relics and a giant death mask of Wagner. The Grail itself is represented in various forms, including Wagner's Bayreuth Theatre towards the end. Parsifal's key transformation is portrayed with a change of actor to an androgynous but deliberately female-suggesting form in order to achieve a union of male and female.

== Cast ==
- Amfortas / Music Conductor - Armin Jordan (sung by Wolfgang Schöne)
- Gurnemanz - Robert Lloyd
- Titurel - Martin Sperr (sung by Hans Tschammer)
- Parsifal: Michael Kutter, Karin Krick (sung by Reiner Goldberg)
- Young Parsifal - David Luther
- Kundry - Edith Clever (sung by Yvonne Minton)
- Klingsor - Aage Haugland
- Knights of the Grail - Rudolph Gabler, Urban von Klebelsberg, Bruno Romani-Versteeg (sung by Gilles Cachemaille, Paul Frey)
- Squires - Monika Gaertner, Thomas Fink, David Meyer, Judith Schmidt (sung by Christer Bladin, Tamara Herz, Michel Roider, Hanna Schaer)
- Bearer of the Grail - Amelie Syberberg -

== Crew ==
- Music: Richard Wagner
- Armin Jordan conducts the Monte Carlo Philharmonic Orchestra and the Prague Philharmonic Choir
- directed by Hans Jurgen Syberberg
- photography by Igor Luther
- costumes by Veronicka Dorn and Hella Wolter
- Kundry's costumes by Moidele Bickel
- edited by Jutta Brandstaedter and Marianne Fehrenberg
- presented by Francis Ford Coppola
- a Gaumont (Paris)-T.M.S. Film (Munich) coproduction

== Production ==
Prior to making Parsifal, Hans-Jürgen Syberberg had made three films which bring up the subject of Richard Wagner: Ludwig: Requiem for a Virgin King from 1972, The Confessions of Winifred Wagner from 1975 and Hitler: A Film from Germany from 1977. The Confessions of Winifred Wagner had upset the descendants of Wagner, which had the effect that Syberberg was not allowed to use any existing recording of the opera for the soundtrack of Parsifal. A production was instead arranged specifically for the film, with Armin Jordan as conductor. The film was shot entirely in studio in 35 days, in Bavaria Atelier in Munich. The budget was just above three million Deutsche Mark.

== Reception ==
The New York Times' John Rockwell wrote: "Hans Jurgen Syberberg's film version of Richard Wagner's music drama, Parsifal, should enthrall both film lovers and Wagner fans. Mr. Syberberg's work represents not only the summation of his career thus far, but is as gripping, strange and, in the end, devotionally faithful a staging as any Wagner opera has received in our time." Rockwell continued: "Just why Mr. Syberberg's scenic innovations don't seem as disturbing as other modern directorial innovations - Patrice Chéreau's Bayreuth Ring, for instance - is hard to explain. ... [I]nstead of their shocking us away from the romantic spell of the music, they reinforce that spell. It's as if Wagner's hypnotic allure and Brecht's intellectualized alienation have been somehow mystically united." Graham Bradshaw wrote in London Review of Books: "Using clever front projection techniques, [Syberberg] provides a rapid background commentary on the main dramatic action: this is sometimes contrived and disruptive, but more frequently suggests the reflexes and ricochets of a mind that is actively engaging with Parsifal."

The film ranks No. 8 in Cahiers du Cinéma's Annual Top 10 Lists in 1982. Cahiers du Cinéma featured a glowing, dedicated critique of the film in its July/August issue (Issue #338). The French film magazine famously championed the 4.5-hour filmed opera, praising it as a cinematic triumph and a visual manifestation of Wagner's Gesamtkunstwerk.

== Notes ==
- Olsen, Solveig (2005): Hans Jürgen Syberberg and His Film of Wagner's Parsifal, University Press of America. ISBN 0-7618-3376-5
- Davidović, Dalibor (2023): Figuren Wagners - und Syberbergs, in: Kordula Knaus & Susanne Kogler (eds.): Musik – Politik – Gesellschaft: Michael Walter zum 65. Geburtstag, Metzler, 301-338. ISBN 978-3-662-66796-5
