= Edith Clever =

German actress (born 1940)

- Born: 13 December 1940 (age 85); Wuppertal, Germany
- Occupation: Actress
- Years active: 1976–?

Edith Clever (born 13 December 1940, in Wuppertal) is a German actress.

== Filmography ==
- 1976: Summerfolk
- 1976: Die Marquise von O. (Die Marquise von O)
- 1978: Die linkshändige Frau (The Left-Handed Woman)
- 1979: Mädchenjahre (L'Adolescente)
- 1979: Trilogie des Wiedersehens
- 1980: Groß und Klein
- 1982: Parsifal
- 1985: Die Nacht
- 1986: Drei Schwestern
- 1987: Penthesilea
- 1987: Fräulein Else
- 1990: Die Marquise von O. 'vom Süden in den Norden verlegt'
- 1994: Ein Traum, was sonst (A Dream, What Else?)

== Awards ==
- 1977 – Deutscher Darstellerpreis (Chaplin-Schuh)
- 1982 – Bayerischer Filmpreis
- 1988 – Gertrud-Eysoldt-Ring
- 2006 – Nestroy Theatre Prize
