= Hans Joachim von Rohr =

German politician

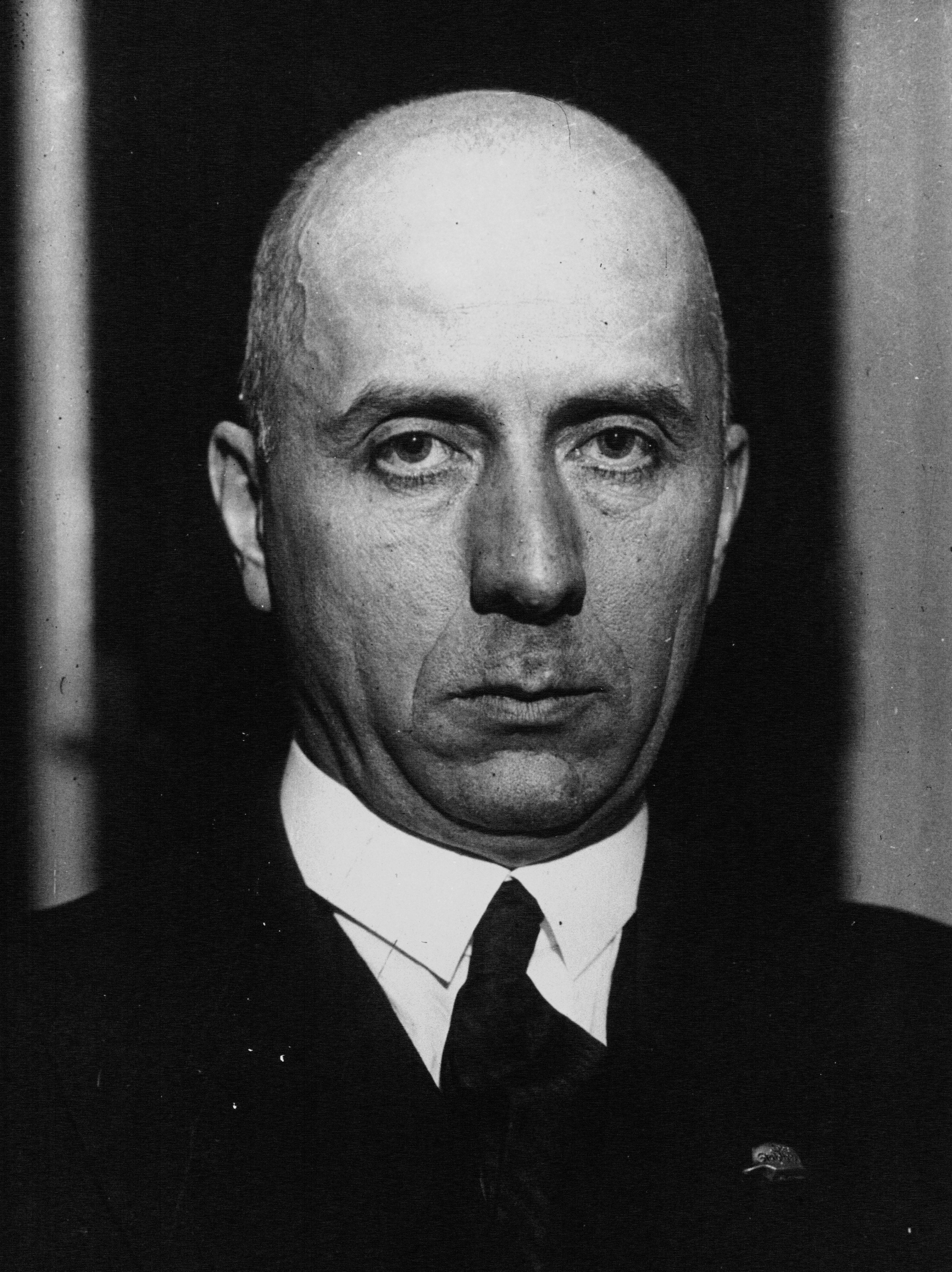
Hansjoachim von Rohr in 1933

Hans Joachim von Rohr (1 October 1888 in Demmin, Province of Pomerania – 10 November 1971) was a German politician with the German National People's Party.

== Biography ==
Hans Joachim von Rohr was born in 1888 as the son of the Pomeranian landowner Hans von Rohr, who had purchased 1881, the House Demmin. After finishing high school Demmin studied law and economics in Heidelberg, Berlin and Greifswald. Prior to 1914 he worked as a clerk at the District Court with the government in Demmin and Merseburg. After participating in the First World War, starting in 1919 he took over the management of family estates.

Rohr-Demmin started politically active in the Weimar period in the German National People's Party. From 1924 to 1932 Rohr-Demmin belonged to the Prussian State Parliament as a deputy. In addition, he served from 1925 to 1933 as chairman of the Section dess the Agrarian League in the province of Pomerania. In July 1934 Rohr-Demmin sent a memorandum to Hitler critical of the government. During the Röhm Putsch, he had to keep hidden. In 1942 Rohr-Demmin was convicted and given a prison sentence but was released again after the verdict was annulled by the Supreme Court. After the assassination 20 July plot he was again arrested and remained in prison until the war ended. After the Second World War his property was confiscated and he moved to West Germany.
