= Die Nacht (film) =

1985 film

- Directed by: Hans-Jürgen Syberberg
- Screenplay by: Hans-Jürgen Syberberg
- Produced by: Hans Jürgen Syberberg
- Starring: Edith Clever
- Cinematography: Xaver Schwarzenberger
- Edited by: Jutta Brandstaedter
- Production company: TMS Film GmbH
- Release date: May 1985
- Running time: 367 minutes
- Country: West Germany
- Language: German

Die Nacht ("The night") is a 1985 West German installation film directed by Hans-Jürgen Syberberg. It consists of a six hours long monologue performed by Edith Clever, who reads texts by Syberberg and many different authors, such as Johann Wolfgang von Goethe, Heinrich von Kleist, Plato, Friedrich Hölderlin, Novalis, Friedrich Nietzsche, Eduard Mörike, Richard Wagner, William Shakespeare, Martin Heidegger, Samuel Beckett and chief Seattle. The film was screened out of competition at the 1985 Cannes Film Festival.

Die Nacht has primarily been shown as an exhibition at art galleries, where viewers have been welcome to come and go as they please. Syberberg has said: "The gesamtkunstwerk I formerly strove for, now [with Edith Clever] became a theater of the world within one person ... where film and theater came together for me. The film on the stage, and the theater in the film." The film won the Deutscher Filmpreis for Best Direction and Best Actress.
