= Kletzin =

- Municipality
- Location of Kletzin within Mecklenburgische Seenplatte district
- Interactive map of Kletzin
- Location within Germany Location within Mecklenburg-Vorpommern
- Coordinates: 53°56′N 13°11′E
- Country: Germany
- State: Mecklenburg-Vorpommern
- District: Mecklenburgische Seenplatte
- Municipal assoc.: Demmin-Land
- Subdivisions: 4

Government
  - Mayor: Detlef Klietz

Area
  - Total: 27.27 km^{2} (10.53 sq mi)
- Elevation: 3 m (9.8 ft)

Population (2025-12-31)
  - Total: 651
  - Density: 23.9/km^{2} (61.8/sq mi)
- Time zone: UTC+01:00 (CET)
  - Summer (DST): UTC+02:00 (CEST)
- Postal codes: 17111
- Dialling codes: 039998
- Vehicle registration: DM
- Website: www.amt-demmin-land.de

Kletzin is a municipality in the Mecklenburgische Seenplatte district, in Mecklenburg-Vorpommern, Germany.
