= Beggerow =

- Municipality
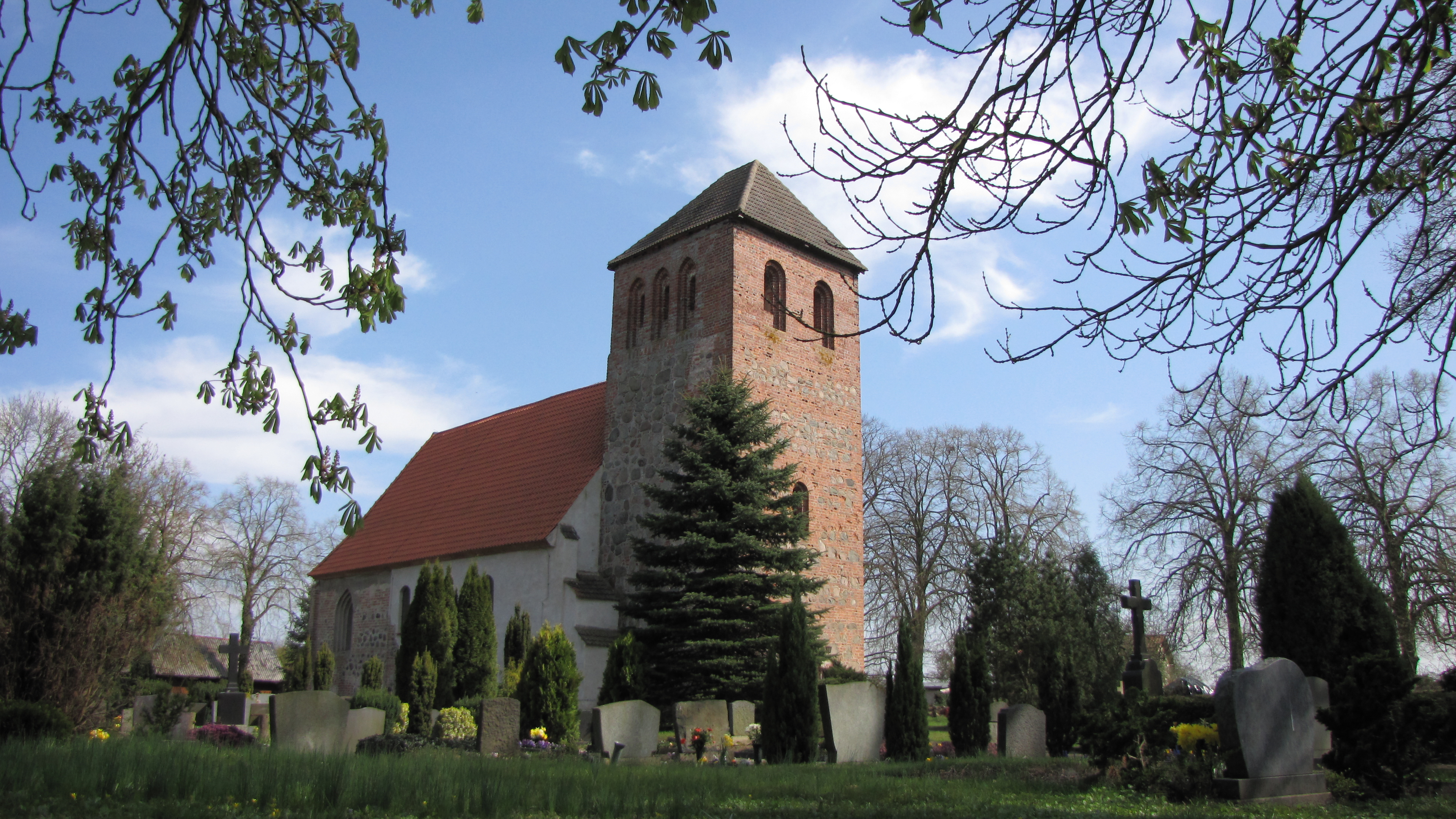
- Medieval church in Beggerow

- Location of Beggerow within Mecklenburgische Seenplatte district
- Interactive map of Beggerow
- Location within Germany Location within Mecklenburg-Vorpommern
- Coordinates: 53°50′N 13°03′E
- Country: Germany
- State: Mecklenburg-Vorpommern
- District: Mecklenburgische Seenplatte
- Municipal assoc.: Demmin-Land
- Subdivisions: 6 Ortsteile

Government
  - Mayor: Wolf-Peter Peetz

Area
  - Total: 29.69 km^{2} (11.46 sq mi)
- Elevation: 39 m (128 ft)

Population (2025-12-31)
  - Total: 471
  - Density: 15.9/km^{2} (41.1/sq mi)
- Time zone: UTC+01:00 (CET)
  - Summer (DST): UTC+02:00 (CEST)
- Postal codes: 17111
- Dialling codes: 039996
- Vehicle registration: DM
- Website: www.amt-demmin-land.de

Beggerow is a municipality in the Mecklenburgische Seenplatte district, in Mecklenburg-Vorpommern, Germany.
