= Siedenbrünzow =

- Municipality
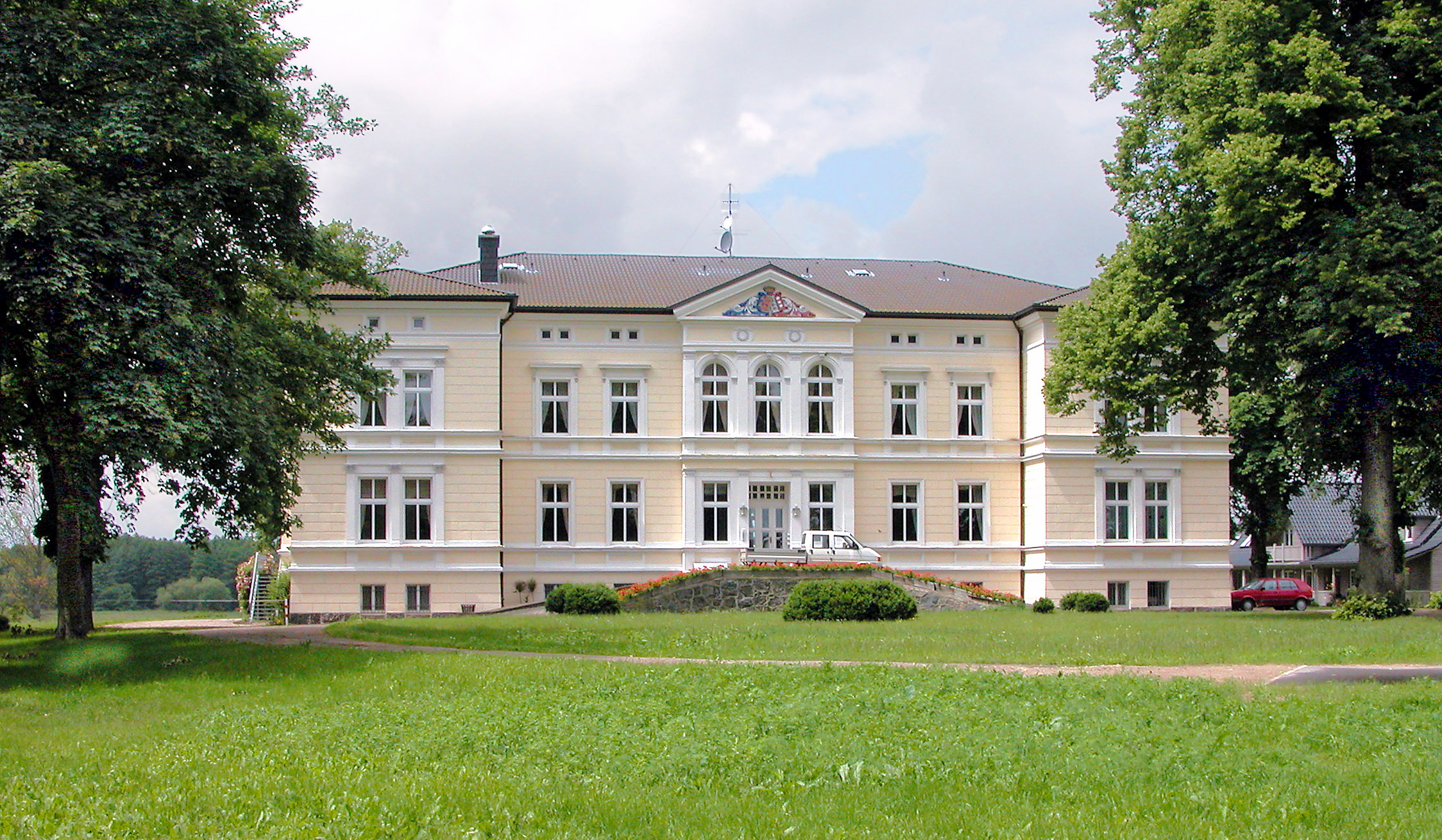
- Herrenhaus Vanselow in Siedenbrünzow

- Location of Siedenbrünzow within Mecklenburgische Seenplatte district
- Interactive map of Siedenbrünzow
- Location within Germany Location within Mecklenburg-Vorpommern
- Coordinates: 53°54′N 13°09′E
- Country: Germany
- State: Mecklenburg-Vorpommern
- District: Mecklenburgische Seenplatte
- Municipal assoc.: Demmin-Land
- Subdivisions: 6

Government
  - Mayor: Wolfgang Kuhrt

Area
  - Total: 27.67 km^{2} (10.68 sq mi)
- Elevation: 9 m (30 ft)

Population (2025-12-31)
  - Total: 467
  - Density: 16.9/km^{2} (43.7/sq mi)
- Time zone: UTC+01:00 (CET)
  - Summer (DST): UTC+02:00 (CEST)
- Postal codes: 17111
- Dialling codes: 039998
- Vehicle registration: DM
- Website: www.amt-demmin-land.de

Siedenbrünzow is a municipality in the Mecklenburgische Seenplatte district, in Mecklenburg-Vorpommern, Germany.

== Notable people ==
- Hans Karl von Winterfeldt (1707–1757), Prussian general
