= Utzedel =

- Municipality
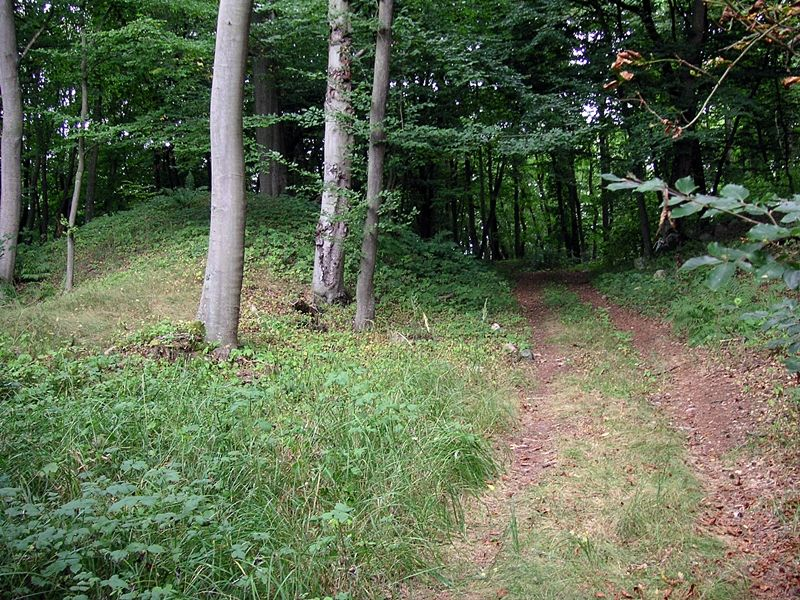
- Burgwall Utzedel in Utzedel

- Location of Utzedel within Mecklenburgische Seenplatte district
- Interactive map of Utzedel
- Location within Germany Location within Mecklenburg-Vorpommern
- Coordinates: 53°52′N 13°07′E
- Country: Germany
- State: Mecklenburg-Vorpommern
- District: Mecklenburgische Seenplatte
- Municipal assoc.: Demmin-Land
- Subdivisions: 5

Government
  - Mayor: Hans Schubbe

Area
  - Total: 25.77 km^{2} (9.95 sq mi)
- Elevation: 29 m (95 ft)

Population (2025-12-31)
  - Total: 400
  - Density: 16/km^{2} (40/sq mi)
- Time zone: UTC+01:00 (CET)
  - Summer (DST): UTC+02:00 (CEST)
- Postal codes: 17111
- Dialling codes: 039993
- Vehicle registration: DM
- Website: www.amt-demmin-land.de

Utzedel is a municipality in the Mecklenburgische Seenplatte district, in Mecklenburg-Vorpommern, Germany.
