= Warrenzin =

- Municipality
- Location of Warrenzin within Mecklenburgische Seenplatte district
- Interactive map of Warrenzin
- Location within Germany Location within Mecklenburg-Vorpommern
- Coordinates: 53°54′N 12°57′E
- Country: Germany
- State: Mecklenburg-Vorpommern
- District: Mecklenburgische Seenplatte
- Municipal assoc.: Demmin-Land
- Subdivisions: 4

Government
  - Mayor: Heinrich Höke

Area
  - Total: 29.05 km^{2} (11.22 sq mi)
- Elevation: 19 m (62 ft)

Population (2025-12-31)
  - Total: 345
  - Density: 11.9/km^{2} (30.8/sq mi)
- Time zone: UTC+01:00 (CET)
  - Summer (DST): UTC+02:00 (CEST)
- Postal codes: 17111
- Dialling codes: 039998
- Vehicle registration: DM
- Website: www.amt-demmin-land.de

Warrenzin is a municipality in the Mecklenburgische Seenplatte district, in Mecklenburg-Vorpommern, Germany.
