= Bechen =

Village in Kürten, North Rhine-Westphalia, Germany

- Village
- Interactive map of Bechen
- Coordinates: 51°02′25″N 7°12′36″E
- Country: Germany
- State: North Rhine-Westphalia
- District: Rheinisch-Bergischer Kreis
- Municipality: Kürten

Area
  - Total: 1.163 km^{2} (0.449 sq mi)
- Elevation: 230 m (750 ft)

Population (2022)
  - Total: 2,810
- Postal code: 51515
- Area code: 02268

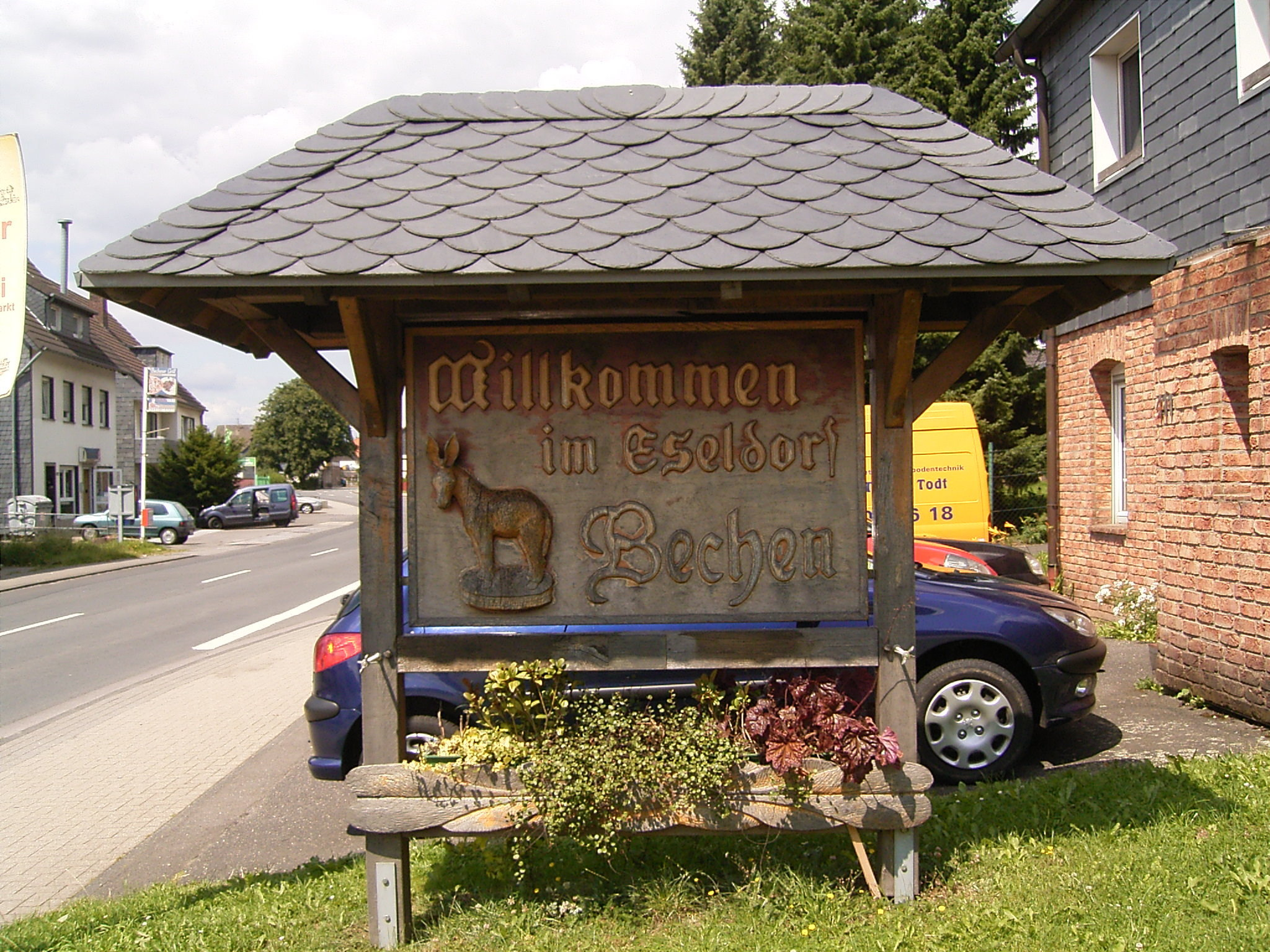
Entrance sign referring to Bechen as donkey village, 2008.

Bechen is a village in the municipality of Kürten in the Rheinisch-Bergischer Kreis of North Rhine-Westphalia, Germany. It is located near the southern edge of the Große Dhünntalsperre (Great Dhünn Dam) reservoir and forms part of the rural settlement structure of the municipality.

== History ==
Bechen's first recorded mention is from around 1175, when an estate near the present village is documented as having been donated by a local landowner named Reinald von Kenten for ecclesiastical purposes.

In 2025, Bechen marked this with an 850-year anniversary program, including a history-themed opening event and further public celebrations.

Bechen has a historical tradition of using donkeys as pack animals by farmers transporting goods to markets, including to the Cologne market. This led to the village being known by the nickname Eselsdorf [donkey village] in regional descriptions. The tradition is reflected in a donkey sculpture created by Heide Dobberkau and installed in the village centre in 1983, reflecting the role of donkeys in Bechen's past.

== Geography ==
Bechen lies at an elevation of approximately 230 metres above sea level and covers an area of about 1.16 square kilometres. The village is located in the Bergisches Land region, characterised by low mountain terrain and dispersed rural settlements. It is administratively part of the municipality of Kürten.

== Landmarks ==
The Roman Catholic church of St. Antonius Einsiedler (Anthony the Great) is a central architectural and religious landmark in Bechen. According to records of the Archdiocese of Cologne, a predecessor church existed by the High Middle Ages and included a Romanesque tower, and the site later came under ecclesiastical patronage associated with the Altenberg region. The church was destroyed by a fire in the 19th century and reconstructed in the late 1870s; due to structural concerns, the building was later largely replaced in the 1970s, while incorporating earlier architectural elements. Documentation by the Forschungsstelle Glasmalerei des 20. Jahrhunderts [Research Centre for Twentieth-Century Stained Glass] records stained-glass windows produced in 1914 by the Oidtmann workshop and describes their iconography and historical context within the church.

== Contemporary developments ==
In the early 2020s, Bechen was the subject of renewed local attention in connection with demographic change, community initiatives, and preparations for its 850-year anniversary in 2025. There were multi-year planning efforts also inserted into a broader municipal development of Kürten.

== Gallery ==
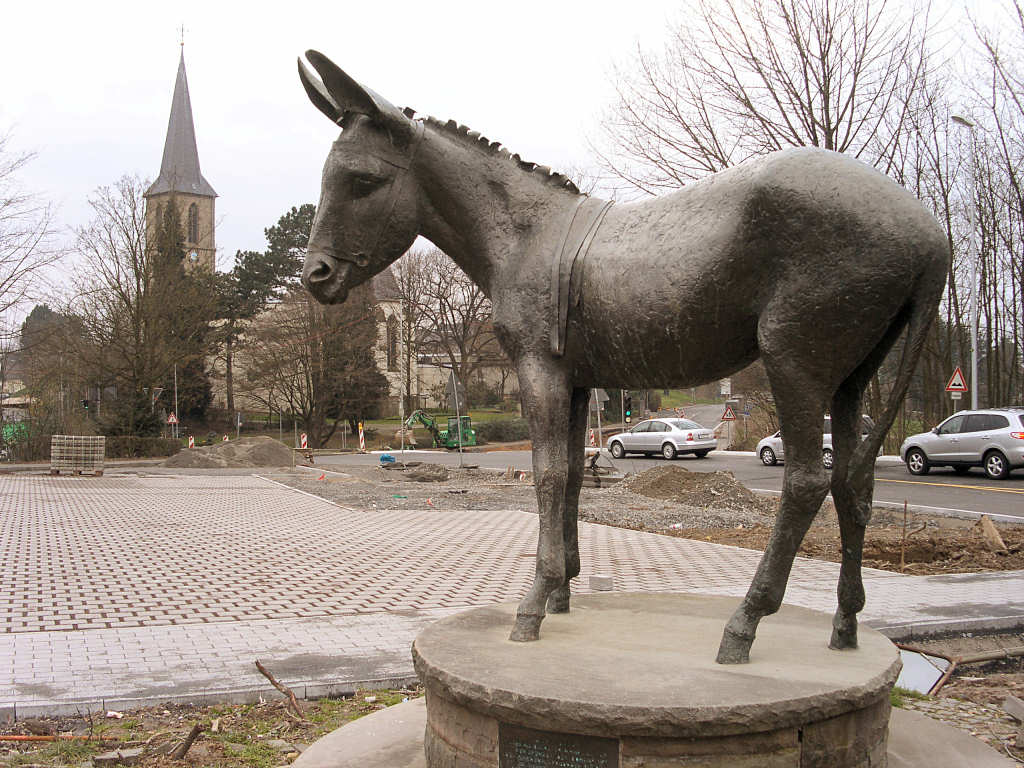
Donkey sculpture by Heide Dobberkau, installed in 1983.

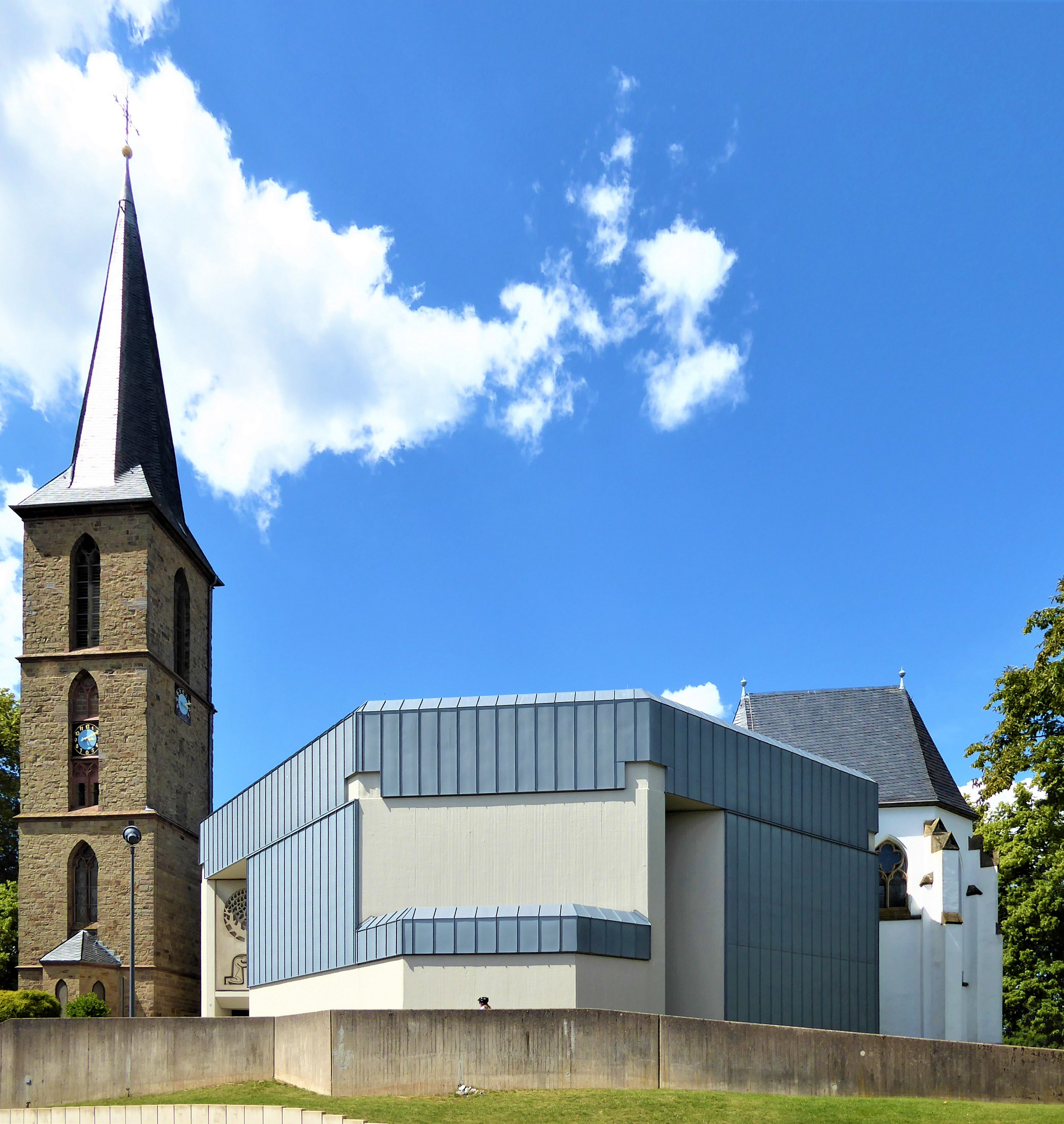
St. Antonius Einsiedler Church.

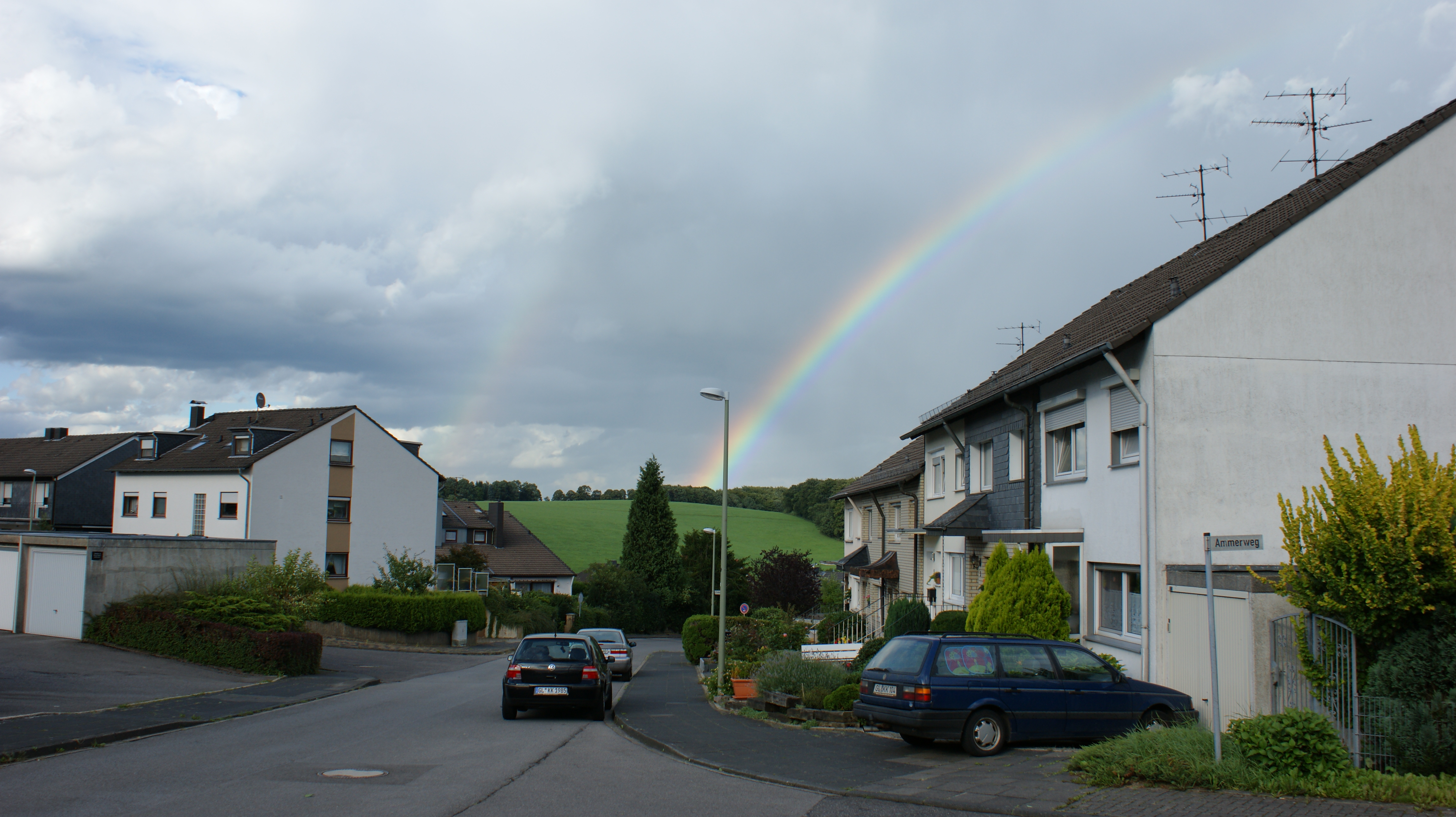
Bechen, 2008.
