= The Confessions of Winifred Wagner =

1975 German documentary film

- Directed by: Hans-Jürgen Syberberg
- Produced by: Hans-Jürgen Syberberg
- Cinematography: Dietrich Lohmann
- Edited by: Agape von Dorstewitz
- Production companies: TMS Film; Bayerischer Rundfunk; Österreichischer Rundfunk
- Release date: 1975
- Running time: 302 minutes
- Country: West Germany
- Language: German

The Confessions of Winifred Wagner (German: Winifred Wagner und die Geschichte des Hauses Wahnfried, 1914–1975, lit. 'Winifred Wagner and the History of the House of Wahnfried, 1914–1975') is a 1975 West German documentary film directed by Hans-Jürgen Syberberg.

== Summary ==
It is about Winifred Wagner, widow of Richard Wagner's son Siegfried Wagner and the person responsible for the Bayreuth Festival from 1930 and 1945.

== Production ==
The film is a five hour long interview where Syberberg talks to the then-78-year-old Wagner about her work, her family, Wagner's music and Adolf Hitler. The tone is kept dry and seemingly objective, which is reflected in the original German title, which, unlike the English, does not imply any guilt.

== See also ==
- Wahnfried
