= Borrentin =

- Municipality
- Location of Borrentin within Mecklenburgische Seenplatte district
- Interactive map of Borrentin
- Location within Germany Location within Mecklenburg-Vorpommern
- Coordinates: 53°49′N 12°58′E
- Country: Germany
- State: Mecklenburg-Vorpommern
- District: Mecklenburgische Seenplatte
- Municipal assoc.: Demmin-Land
- Subdivisions: 8

Government
  - Mayor: Eckhard Wach

Area
  - Total: 48.09 km^{2} (18.57 sq mi)
- Elevation: 39 m (128 ft)

Population (2025-12-31)
  - Total: 715
  - Density: 14.9/km^{2} (38.5/sq mi)
- Time zone: UTC+01:00 (CET)
  - Summer (DST): UTC+02:00 (CEST)
- Postal codes: 17111
- Dialling codes: 039994
- Vehicle registration: DM

Borrentin is a municipality in the Mecklenburgische Seenplatte district, in Mecklenburg-Western Pomerania, Germany. Seat of the Amt Borrentin until 2004, it is now part of the Amt Demmin-Land. The highway B194 goes through the municipality. The main economical activity in Borrentin is agriculture. Other businesses are small in size.
