= Nossendorf =

- Municipality
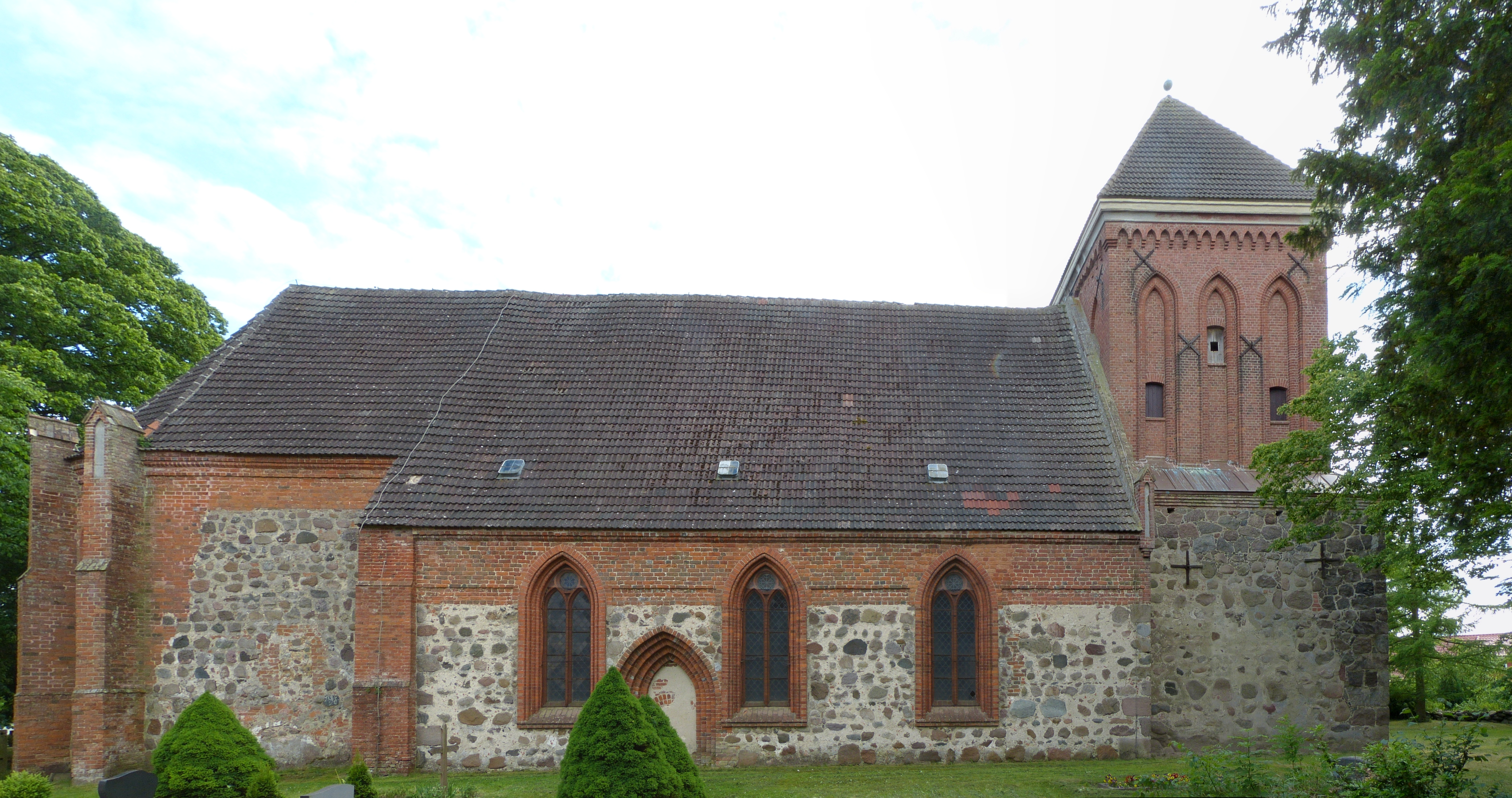
- Church in Nossendorf

- Location of Nossendorf within Mecklenburgische Seenplatte district
- Interactive map of Nossendorf
- Location within Germany Location within Mecklenburg-Vorpommern
- Coordinates: 53°58′N 12°57′E
- Country: Germany
- State: Mecklenburg-Vorpommern
- District: Mecklenburgische Seenplatte
- Municipal assoc.: Demmin-Land
- Subdivisions: 5

Government
  - Mayor: Fred Schult

Area
  - Total: 35.10 km^{2} (13.55 sq mi)
- Elevation: 9 m (30 ft)

Population (2025-12-31)
  - Total: 639
  - Density: 18.2/km^{2} (47.2/sq mi)
- Time zone: UTC+01:00 (CET)
  - Summer (DST): UTC+02:00 (CEST)
- Postal codes: 17111
- Dialling codes: 039995
- Vehicle registration: DM
- Website: www.amt-demmin-land.de

Nossendorf is a municipality in the Mecklenburgische Seenplatte district, in Mecklenburg-Vorpommern, Germany.

The municipality of Nossendorf is built up with five villages.

- Annenhof
- Medrow
- Nossendorf (central of municipality)
- Toitz
- Volksdorf
