= Hans-Jürgen Syberberg =

German film director

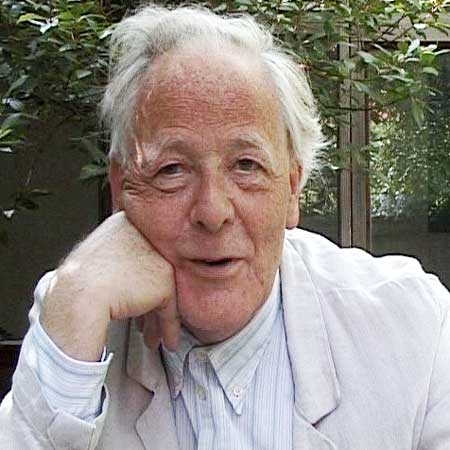
Hans-Jürgen Syberberg in the film The Ister, 2004.

Hans-Jürgen Syberberg (German: [ˈhans ˈjʏʁɡn̩ ˈzyːbɐbɛʁk]; born 8 December 1935) is a German film director, whose best known film is his lengthy feature Hitler: A Film from Germany.

== Early life ==
Born in Nossendorf, Pomerania, the son of an estate owner, Syberberg lived until 1945 in Rostock and Berlin. In 1952 and 1953 he created his first 8 mm takes of rehearsals by the Berliner Ensemble. In 1953 he moved to West Germany, where he in 1956 began studies in literature and art history, completing them the following year. He earned his doctorate in Munich with his thesis on "The Absurd in Dürrenmatt." In 1963 Syberberg began producing documentary films about Fritz Kortner and Romy Schneider for Bavarian Radio and others.

== Cinema ==
For Syberberg, cinema is a form of Gesamtkunstwerk. Many commentators, including Syberberg himself, have characterized his work as a cinematic combination of Bertolt Brecht's doctrine of epic theatre and Richard Wagner's operatic aesthetics. Well known philosophers and intellectuals have written about his work, including Susan Sontag, Gilles Deleuze and Philippe Lacoue-Labarthe.

In 1975 Syberberg released Winifried Wagner und die Geschichte des Hauses Wahnfried von 1914–1975 (English title: The Confessions of Winifred Wagner), a documentary about Winifred Wagner, an Englishwoman who had married Richard Wagner's son Siegfried. The documentary attracted attention because it exposed Mrs Wagner's unrepentant admiration for Adolf Hitler. The film thus proved an embarrassment to the Wagner family and the Bayreuth Festival (which she had run from 1930 until the end of the Second World War). Winifred Wagner objected to the inclusion in the film of conversations she did not know were being recorded.

Syberberg is also noted for an acclaimed visual interpretation of the Wagner opera Parsifal in 1982.

A quarter of a century after his last previous film, Syberberg released the three-hour-long documentary Demminer Chants in 2023. The film is about the town Demmin in north-eastern Germany, where Syberberg grew up and where he has made attempts to reestablish the central market square as a communal space. The film looks at urban planning and the future of local communities.

== Comments on culture and politics ==
Syberberg's work has attracted criticism at least since the publication of the film script of Hitler: A Film from Germany, particularly from the Left, who were amongst many targets of his criticism in that book. In later essays, although he never presented himself as a conservative or sympathizer with German nationalism, his comments began to scandalize a broad spectrum of writers and critics in Germany and elsewhere. Even Susan Sontag, who had written the introduction to the English translation of the book version of Hitler: A Film from Germany, was reportedly shocked by some of his later statements, though she claimed that her feelings about his films were unaffected.

In one notorious example Syberberg wrote in Vom Unglück und Glück der Kunst in Deutschland nach dem letzten Kriege (On the Misfortune and Fortune of Art in Germany after the Last War, 1990):

"Whoever joined the Jews and the leftists was successful, and it did not necessarily have anything to do with love, or understanding, or even inclination. How could Jews tolerate that, being that these others only wanted power."

Ian Buruma, in the New York Review of Books, quotes several of Syberberg's controversial statements. Syberberg described modern German art as "filthy and sick... in praise of cowardice and treason, of criminals, whores, of hate, ugliness, of lies and crimes and all that is unnatural." He also wrote that:

"The Jewish interpretation of the world followed upon the Christian, just as the Christian one followed Roman and Greek culture. So now Jewish analyses, images, definitions of art, science, sociology, literature, politics, the information media, dominate. Marx and Freud are the pillars that mark the road from East to West. Neither are imaginable without Jewishness. Their systems are defined by it. The axis USA-Israel guarantees the parameters. That is the way people think now, the way they feel, act and disseminate information. We live in the Jewish epoch of European cultural history. And we can only wait, at the pinnacle of our technological power, for our last judgment at the edge of the apocalypse…. So that's the way it looks, for all of us, suffocating in unprecedented technological prosperity, without spirit, without meaning... Those who want to have good careers go along with Jews and leftists [and] the race of superior men [Rasse der Herrenmenschen] has been seduced, the land of poets and thinkers has become the fat booty of corruption, of business, of lazy comfort."

Buruma writes:

"It is not for his aesthetics, however, that Syberberg has been attacked, but for his politics. The strongest criticism of his book was published in Der Spiegel, the liberal weekly magazine. Syberberg's views, wrote the critic, were precisely those that led to the book burning in 1933, and prepared the way for the Final Solution of 1942. In fact, he went on, they are worse, for "now we know that they are caked with blood…. They are not just abstruse nonsense, they are criminal." The Spiegel critic compared Syberberg to the young Hitler, the failed art student in Vienna, who rationalized his failure by blaming it on a conspiracy of left-wing Jews. Syberberg feels he is an unappreciated genius, and he too blames it on the same forces.

"Frank Schirrmacher, the young literary editor of the Frankfurter Allgemeine Zeitung, and the scourge of woolly thinkers of all political persuasions, is equally opposed to Syberberg and draws similar parallels with the Twenties and Thirties. And like the critic in Der Spiegel, he singles out for special censure an interview with Die Zeit in which Syberberg claimed that he 'could understand' the feeling of the SS man on the railway ramp of Auschwitz, who, in Himmler's words, 'made himself hard' for the sake of fulfilling his mission to the end. He did not admire this feeling, but he could understand it. Just as he could understand its opposite, the rejection of principles to act humanely."

== Personal life ==
Syberberg currently resides mainly on his family estate in Nossendorf which he has bought back and restored, but has a secondary residence in Munich.

== Awards ==
- 1979 Bavarian Film Award, Best Production Design

== Bibliography ==
- Interpretationen zum Drama Friedrich Dürrenmatts: Zwei Modellinterpretationen zur Wesensdeutung des modernen Dramas. Uni-Druck, Munich 1965.
- Fotografie der 30er Jahre: Eine Anthologie. Schirmer-Mosel Verlag, Munich 1977, ISBN 978-3-921375-14-3.
- Filmbuch – Filmästhetik – 10 Jahre Filmalltag – Meine Trauerarbeit für Bayreuth – Wörterbuch des deutschen Filmkritikers. Fischer Taschenbuch, 1979, ISBN 3-596-23650-9.
- Die freudlose Gesellschaft-Notizen aus dem letzten Jahr. Hanser Verlag Munich 1981, ISBN 3-446-13351-8.
- Kleist, Penthesilea. Hentrich, Berlin 1988, ISBN 3-926175-49-4.
- Vom Unglück und Glück der Kunst in Deutschland nach dem letzten Kriege. Matthes & Seitz, Munich 1990, ISBN 3-88221-761-8.
- Der verlorene Auftrag – ein Essay. Karolinger, Vienna 1994, ISBN 978-3-85418-068-5.
- Das Rechte – tun. Kronenbitter, Munich 1995, ISBN 3-930580-02-0.
- Film nach dem Film. Verlag für moderne Kunst, Nuremberg 2008, ISBN 3-940748-12-9.
