= List of lakes of Turkmenistan =

This is a list of lakes and reservoirs of Turkmenistan.

Natural lakes:

- Kattashor Lake (on Amu Darya, in Lebap Province)
- Sarygamysh Lake
- Kow Ata

Artificial lakes:

- Hanhowuz (Khauz-Khan) Reservoir 37°13′56″N 61°14′37″E
- Golden Age Lake
- Hor Hor Reservoir (on Tejen River)
- Iolotan Reservoir (on Morghab River)
- Kolhozbent Reservoir (on Morghab River)
- Kopetdag Reservoir (Ahal Province, west of Ashgabat)
- Kurtli Reservoir (Ahal Province, north-western outskirts of Ashgabat)
- Saryjazin Reservoir (on Morghab River)
- Tashkepri Reservoir (on Morghab River)
- Tejen Reservoir (on Tejen River)
- Zeid Reservoir (Lebap Region)
