= Main Turkmen Canal =

Unfinished irrigation and navigation project between the Aral and Caspian Seas

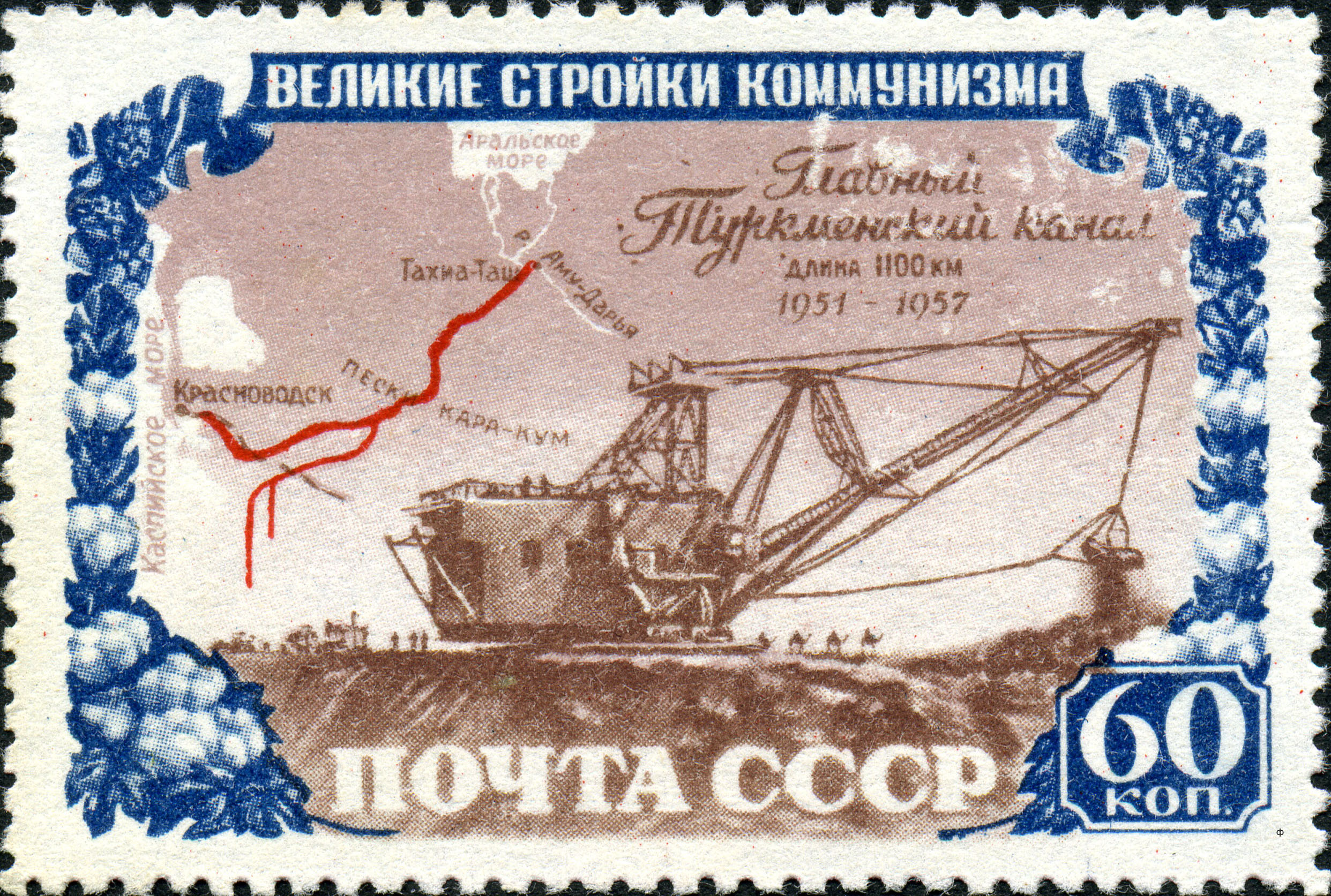
Planned route of the Main Turkmen Canal on a 1951 stamp

The Main Turkmen Canal (Russian: Главный Туркменский канал, romanized: Glavnyy Turkmenskiy kanal) was a large-scale irrigation project in the Turkmen Soviet Socialist Republic. The canal was intended to transport water from the Amu Darya river to Krasnovodsk (now Türkmenbaşy), a city in Turkmenistan on the coast of the Caspian Sea. The canal was going to use the course of the ancient dry Uzboy River bed.

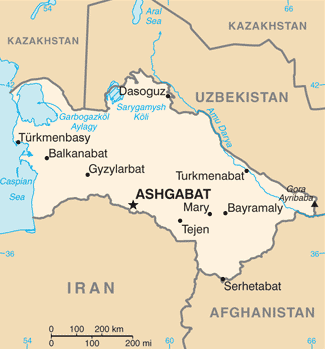
Map of Turkmenistan

== History ==
The building of canals and channels for irrigation in Turkmenistan began in the 1930s. In 1929, the Bassaga-Kerkinskiy Canal was completed at a length of 100 km. The development of the outlet design for the Amu Darya River began in 1932. The design was to bring water from the Amu Darya, across Turkmenistan to the coast of the Caspian Sea to irrigate the Karakum Desert. The project was supported by Hydrologist V. Tsinzerling, who estimated the volume of water taken from the river to be around 17–35 cubic kilometres (4.1–8.4 cu mi), which, according to estimations, should not have injured the economy of Uzbekistan or the ecology of the Aral Sea. It was intended to fill Sarykamysskoe Lake and to take from 30 to 50 cubic kilometers per year for 4 to 8 years. This version was approved by the State Planning Committee of the USSR in 1932. The second plan was chosen. The length of the canal was to be more than 1200 kilometers, beginning from Takhiatash, a town/city in Uzbekistan, then extended 10 km from the town of Nukus to Krasnovodsk on the Caspian Coast of Turkmenistan. However, the discharge of water into the Caspian Sea was not planned.

== Plan ==
A system of weirs, sluices, reservoirs, hydroelectric power plants, diverters and conduits, over 1000 kilometers long was planned along the canal's route. At the beginning of the canal at Takhiatash, Uzbekistan an enormous weir was built which had to be combined with the hydroelectric power plant. 25 percent of the water from the Amu Darya was to be drained into the canal to drain the Aral Sea. With the level of the Aral Sea lowered, the intention was to use the exposed land for agriculture, but the salt content of the lower reaches of the Amu Darya river had to be lowered according to calculations.

The purpose of the canal was cotton growing, mastery of the new earth in the Karakum Desert, and later, navigation from the Volga River to the Amu Darya. The use of ten thousand dump trucks, bulldozers and excavators was anticipated for construction. The width of the canal was to be more than 100 meters, and a depth of 6–7 meters. There was another projected 10,000 kilometers of main and distribution canals, 2,000 reservoirs and three hydroelectric plants, each producing 100,000 kilowatts. Construction was intended to be finished by 1957.

== Construction ==
Building began after the decision of the Council of Ministers in September 1950. The construction was based in Urgench (at that time part of the Uzbek Soviet Socialist Republic). Urgench was chosen for its rail access. In November 1950, construction workers started work at the building site of the camps that would hold 2000 people. In December, they laid the new city of Takhiatash on the Amu Darya's west side. When the city was first constructed there were two camps beginning to be built in the city for 1500 prisoners or people.

Shipments of goods from the entire country entered Takhiatash, and according to recollections, were stored poorly, and substantial portions were considered unusable. In 1951, several camps and economic objects were built. On June 15, 1952 the railroad from Takhiatash to Chardzhou (now, Türkmenabat) was opened. Infrastructure for the development of the city was created, searching expeditions were organized and aviation was connected. The number of workers during construction is estimated at 10,000; more than half were prisoners.

== Abandonment ==
Less than a month after the death of Joseph Stalin in 1953, construction of the Main Turkmen Canal ceased, alongside similar projects such as sections of the Volga–Baltic Waterway. These construction sites all used large amounts of forced labour and served as prestige projects in the eyes of the MVD which delivered the labourers; however, high-placed government officials realized that such costly projects had little economic use and that the forced labour system as a whole was unsustainable. It is likely that they did not dare to put criticism of the canals on the table while Stalin was alive.

In 1954 construction of the Qaraqum Canal began, along a route far to the south. It stretches 1300 km and irrigates a substantial part of Turkmenistan, and remains the most important canal in Turkmenistan.

Construction of Qaraqum Canal drained the Amu Darya river and therefore enabled huge areas to be opened for cotton production. Nevertheless, it also resulted in the destruction of the native riparian tugay forests, and greatly diminished the inflow of water to the Aral Sea, which caused great ecological catastrophe.

== Sources ==
- A. Zholdasov - On the Ruins of Great Building. History of the Main Turkmen Channel: Journey along the asleep river of Gladyshev
- A.I. K. Sarybaeva "Role of irrigation in the social and economic development of Karakalpakstana"
- Modern Times By H. Scheel, Bertold Spuler, G. Jaschke, F R C Bagley, H. Braun, H. Kahler, W. M. Halle, T. Koszinowski
- Frank Westerman, Engineers of the Soul. Overlook Press, 2011.
