= Raduńskie Lake =

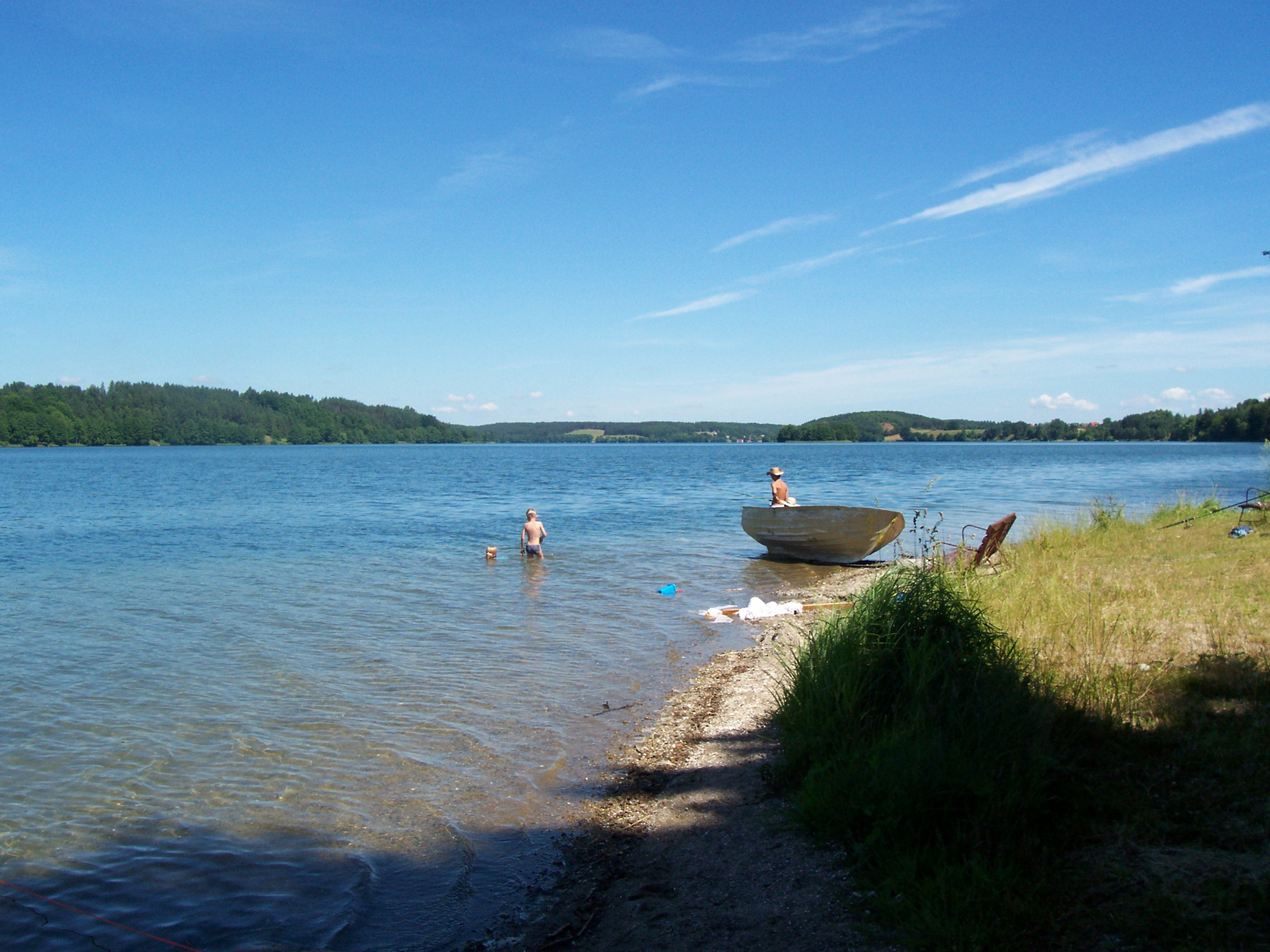
- Raduńskie Lake

- Location within Poland Location within Pomeranian Voivodeship
- Coordinates: 54°16′11″N 18°01′16″E
- Type: lake
- Primary inflows: Rybnica
- Primary outflows: Rybnica, Zimna
- Basin countries: Poland

Raduńskie Lake (or Raduńskie Lakes, divided into Upper and Lower) - a ribbon lake located in the Kashubian Lake District, in the Kartuzy County (Pomeranian Voivodeship) in Poland, part of the Kashubian Landscape Park. The lake is formed in a post-glacial valley, through which the River Radunia flows through. The lake is located in a region known as the Kashubian Switzerland (Szwajcaria Kaszubska).
