= Araxes =

Araxes (Ancient Greek: Ἀράξης, romanized: Aráxēs; Latin: Araxes) was a name given to several rivers in Antiquity, including :

- the Amu Darya
- the Aras
- the Araxes river in Atropatene
- the Syr Darya
- the Uzboy
- the Volga
