= Streptomyces cahuitamycinicus =

Scientific classification
- Domain: Bacteria
- Kingdom: Bacillati
- Phylum: Actinomycetota
- Class: Actinomycetia
- Order: Streptomycetales
- Family: Streptomycetaceae
- Genus: Streptomyces
- Species: S. cahuitamycinicus

Binomial name
- Streptomyces cahuitamycinicus Saygin et al. 2020

Type strain
- 13K301

Species of bacterium

Streptomyces cahuitamycinicus is a bacterium species from the genus of Streptomyces which has been isolated from soil from the Karakum Desert in Turkmenistan.

== See also ==
- List of Streptomyces species
