= Nikolai Petrusevich =

Russian explorer

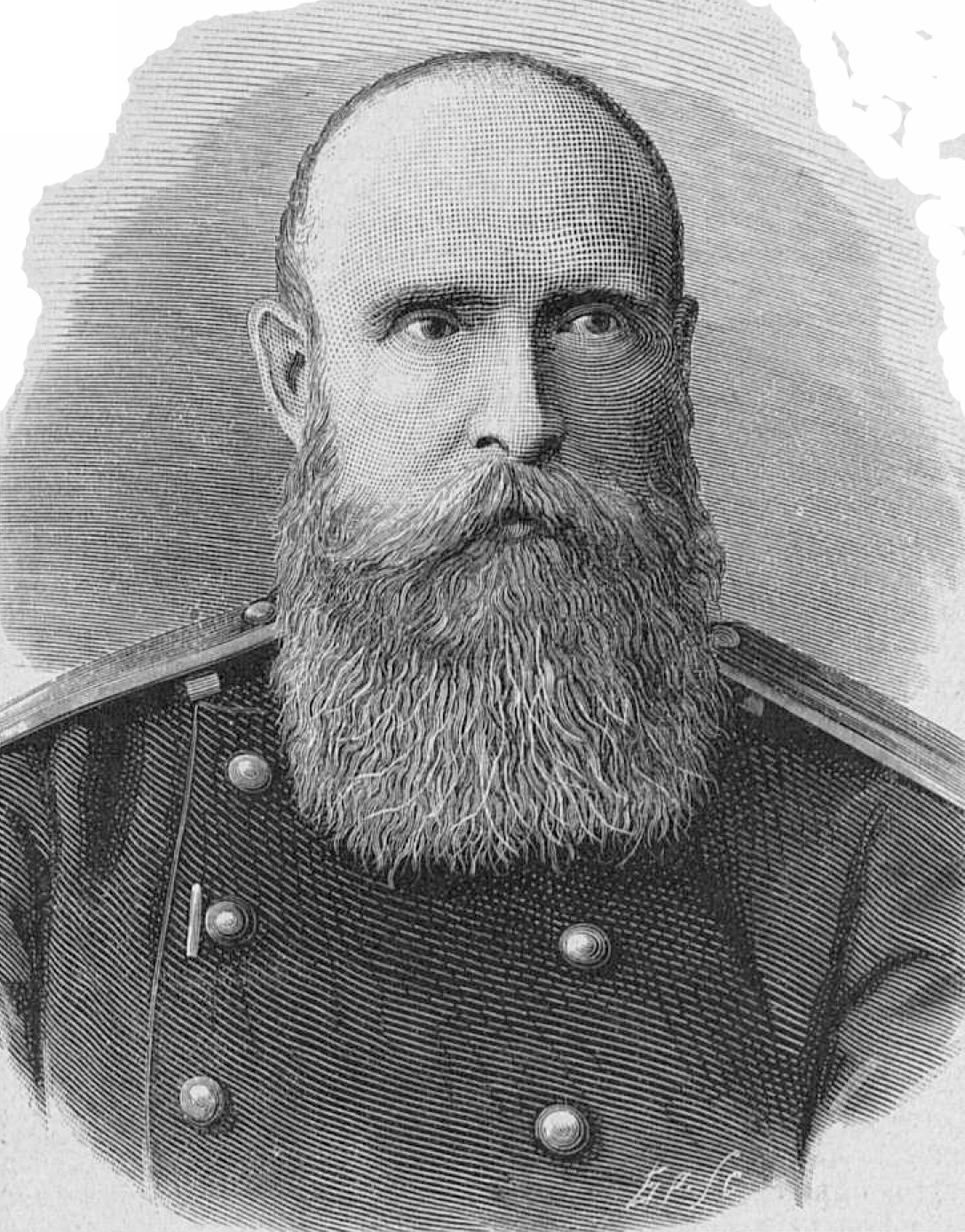
Nikolai Petrusevich

Nikolai G. Petrusevich (1838–1880) was a Russian general, geologist, geographer, and scientist, notable for being a humanitarian officer in the Russian Army and a geographer of Afghanistan. He is credited with discovering the Sarygamysh Depression in 1876. He died at the siege of Dengil Teppe.

== Military career ==
In 1865, as captain, he took up service with the Karachai, where he learned the local language, the local customs, abolished serfdom, organized schools for gifted children, and even helped Muslims make their pilgrimage.

In the early 1870s, when he was just a colonel, he was active in Turkey. He called the Ottoman Empire "rascals and thieves," because they had been merely enslaving exploiters of "Khivans, Bokharans, Persians." On the other hand, he also criticized the Russian Army for barbarism and cruelty, writing...

"...[the Russian Army was ordered to] tie the captives to the city walls and begin shooting them at a distance of 300 paces. It should be clear enough that the regular infantry... could not manage to hit the targets... subjecting the unfortunate Turkmens to the torments of hell."

Petrusevich also acted in a scientific capacity for the Russian Army, surveying the northern Afghanistan border.
