= Zeid Reservoir =

- 15 Years of Independence
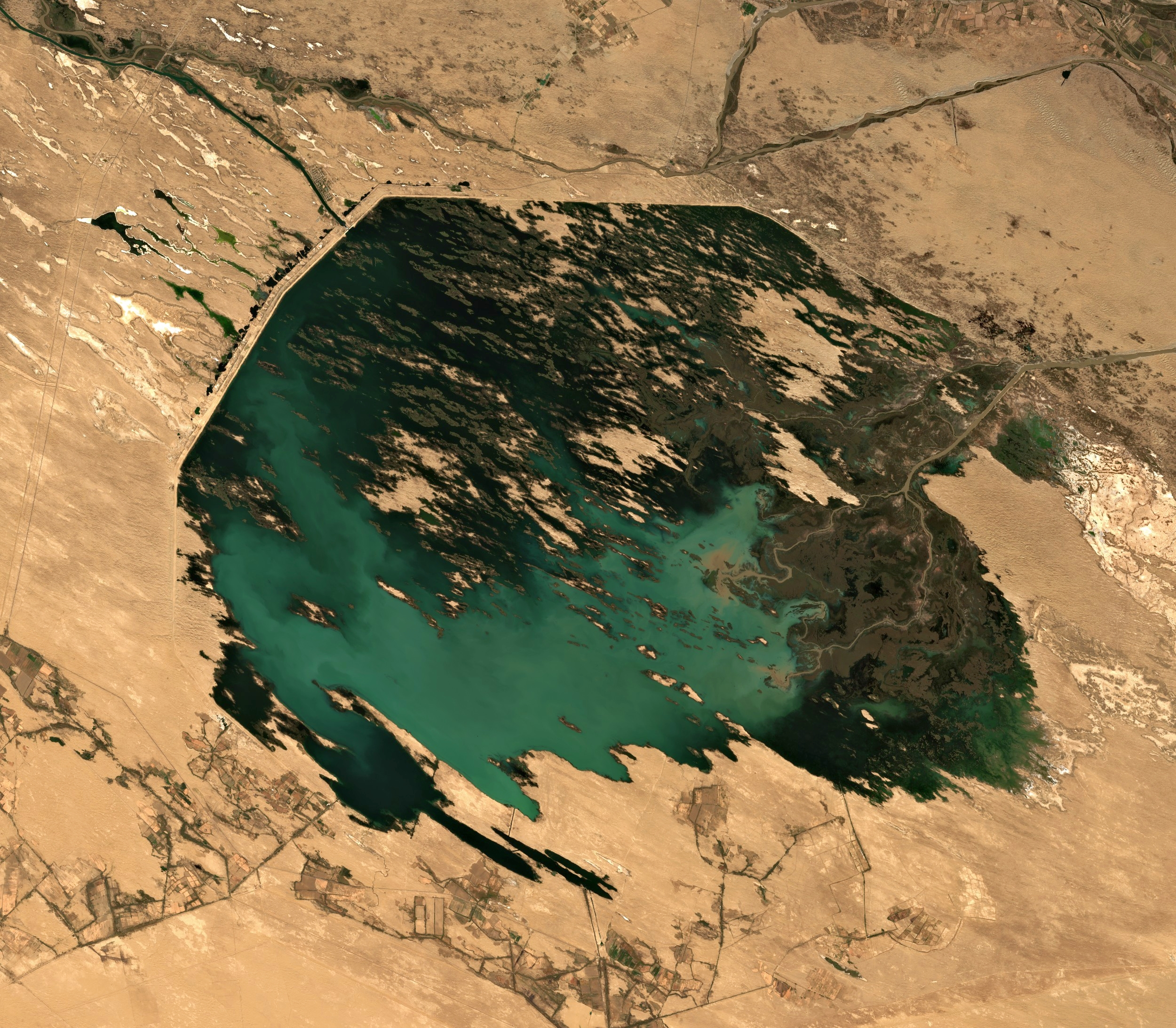
- Interactive map of Zeid Reservoir
- Location: Lebap, Turkmenistan
- Coordinates: 37°28′N 65°17′E
- Type: Reservoir
- Part of: Karakum Canal
- Built: 1963
- Surface area: 465 square kilometres (180 mi^{2})

Zeid Reservoir (now officially known as the 15 Years of Independence reservoir) is a reservoir in Turkmenistan's Lebap region. The reservoir serves a settlement tank for the sediment-rich water of the Amu Darya river.
