= Golden Age Lake =

Reservoir in Turkmenistan

- Karakum Lake
- Altyn Asyr köli (Turkmen)
- Location within Turkmenistan
- Interactive map of Golden Age Lake
- Location: Turkmenistan
- Coordinates: 40°44′N 56°47′E
- Type: reservoir

Golden Age Lake, known as Altyn Asyr köli locally, alternatively as Karakum Lake, is a man-made lake under construction in the Karashor depression in the Karakum Desert of Turkmenistan.

Upon completion, the lake will span 2,000 square kilometres (770 sq mi) with a maximum depth of 70 metres (230 ft), and hold more than 130 cubic kilometers (4600 billion cubic feet) of water. Filling the lake could take 15 years and cost up to $4.5 billion. According to government plans, it is intended to be filled by a 2,650-kilometer (1,650 mi) network of tributary canals. The 432-kilometre long Dashoguz Collector follows for about half its length the bed of the ancient Uzboy River. The Great Turkmen Collector starts in Lebap Province and is 720 km (450 mi) long. They are used for pumping run-off water from irrigated cotton fields towards the lake.

== Benefits and criticism ==
According to the Turkmen government, Golden Age Lake will promote the conservation and sensible use of water resources, in addition to preventing damage to archaeological sites near agricultural fields. Further, it is believed the lake will attract migratory fowl, stimulate biodiversity, and make flowers and plants bloom in a country that is 80% desert.

However, critics point out that much of the water pumped into the searing desert will evaporate, adding that it is likely to be contaminated with toxic pesticides and fertilisers. It is also feared that Turkmenistan may seek to siphon water from the Amu Darya, which runs along the country's northern border with Uzbekistan. That could trigger a dispute between the two countries and inflict further damage on the environment.
