= Karakum Desert =

Desert in Central Asia

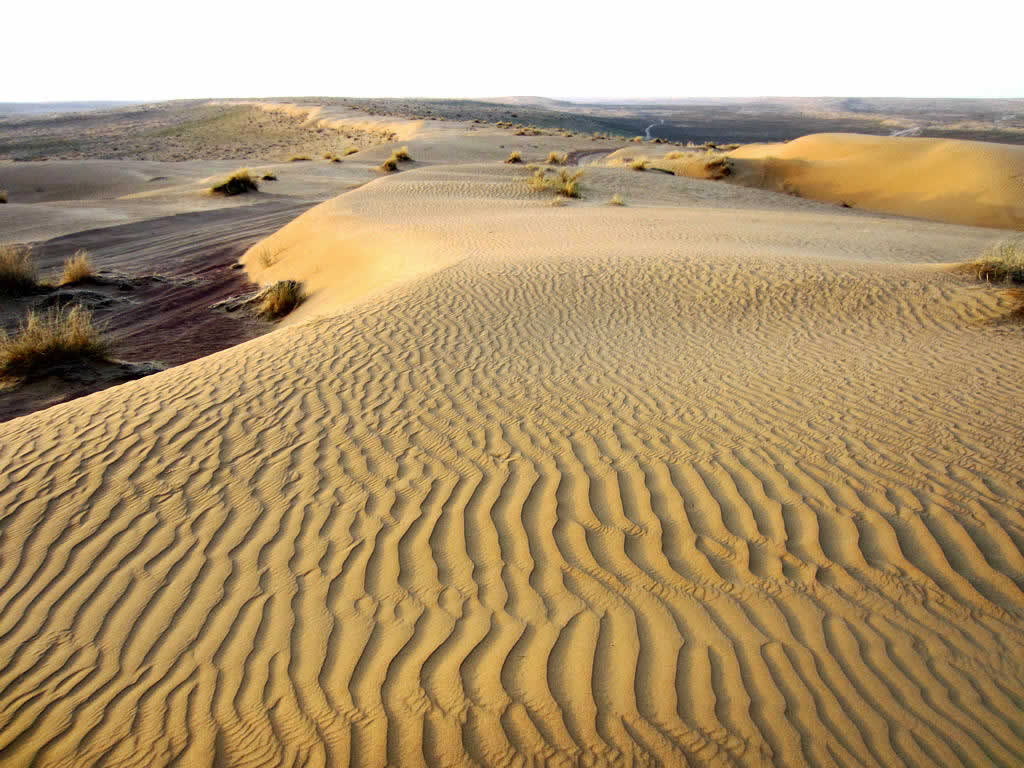
- Sand dunes in the Karakum Desert

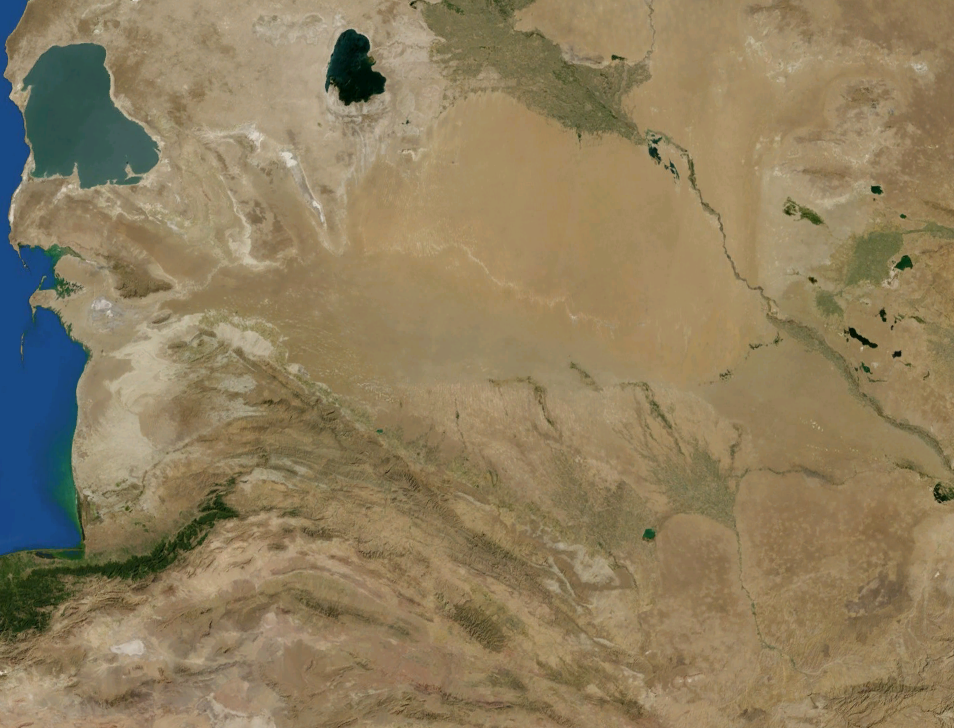
- The Karakum Desert by NASA World Wind, with Sarygamysh Lake near the top
- Area: 350,000 km^{2} (140,000 mi^{2})

Geography
- Country: Turkmenistan
- State/Province: Central Asia
- Coordinates: 40°30′N 60°00′E

The Karakum Desert (/ˈkærəkʌm/ KARR-ə-kum; Russian: Каракумы, IPA: [kərɐˈkumɨ]), also spelt Qaraqum and Garagum (Turkmen: [ɢɑɾɑˈʁʊm]; lit. 'Black Sand'), is the 12th largest desert in the world, located in Central Asia. The name refers to the shale-rich sand beneath the surface. It occupies about 70 percent, or roughly 350,000 km^{2} (140,000 sq mi), of Turkmenistan.

The population is sparse, with an average of one person per 6.5 km^{2} (2.5 sq mi). Rainfall is also rare, ranging from 70 to 150 mm (3 to 6 in) per year.

== Geography ==
The desert covers roughly seventy percent of Turkmenistan, a long east–west swath. It sits east of the Caspian Sea which has a steep east bank. It adjoins, to the north, the long delta feeding the South Aral Sea further north, another endorheic lake, about 58 m (190 ft) higher than the Caspian Sea. The delta is that of the Amu Darya river to the northeast, demarcating the long border with the Kyzylkum Desert of Uzbekistan. The desert is divided into three regions, the elevated northern Trans-Unguz Karakum, the low-lying Central Karakum, and the southeastern Karakum, home to a chain of salt marshes. Since the early 1980s, the relatively small desert extension, the Aralkum, has come to occupy most of the former seabed of the Aral Sea, about 15,440 sq mi (40,000 km^{2}). The sea has fluctuated over millennia, but its majority loss during the Soviet Union's existence coincided with great irrigation projects. The North Aral Sea was partly restored, but the South Aral Sea ebbed to a small-size stasis at its river mouth, which itself dried up by 2014, leaving only fragments of the former sea behind, such as Barsakelmes Lake.

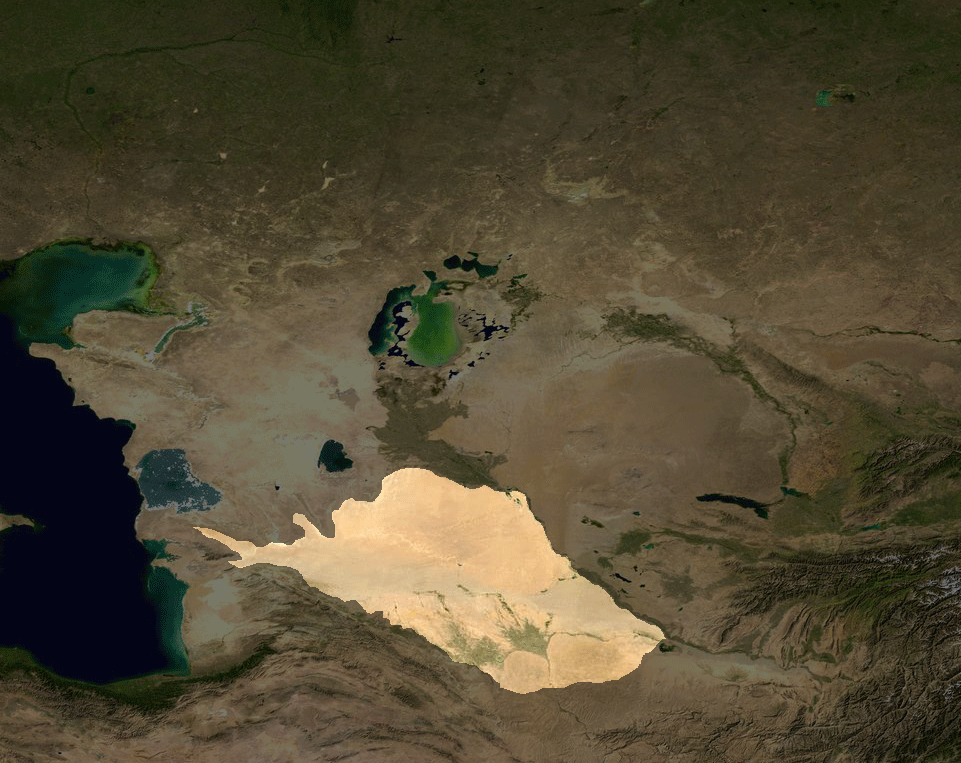
A map of Central Asia. The Karakum Desert is highlighted at the bottom.

Within the north-west edge of the desert used to be a river. In the late Pleistocene, the Amu Darya used to flow beyond the Aral Basin to Sarykamysh Lake then to the Caspian Sea. Sedimentation and floods during a pluvial period led to overflow to the Zeravshan River valley to the east. The two flows merged and formed or expanded Horezm Lake, which had been formed by the earlier Khvalinian period, and as it overflowed northwards it carved its link with the Aral Sea along the Akcha Dar'ya population corridor of that low, gentle valley (a remote community of Western Uzbekistan and north-east Turkmenistan).

== Environment ==
The sands of the Aral Karakum are made of finely-dispersed evaporites and remnants of alkaline mineral deposits, washed into the basin from irrigated fields.

== Wildlife ==
Wildlife in this area is not very diverse and includes insects and arachnids, such as ants, termites, ticks, spiders, dung beetles, and darkling beetles. Lizards, turtles and snakes also live in the Karakum. Bird species include Alauda, desert sparrows, and other species, while rodents include jerboas and gophers. The tolai hare, goitered gazelle, and corsac fox are examples of mammal species in the Karakum Desert.

== Geology ==
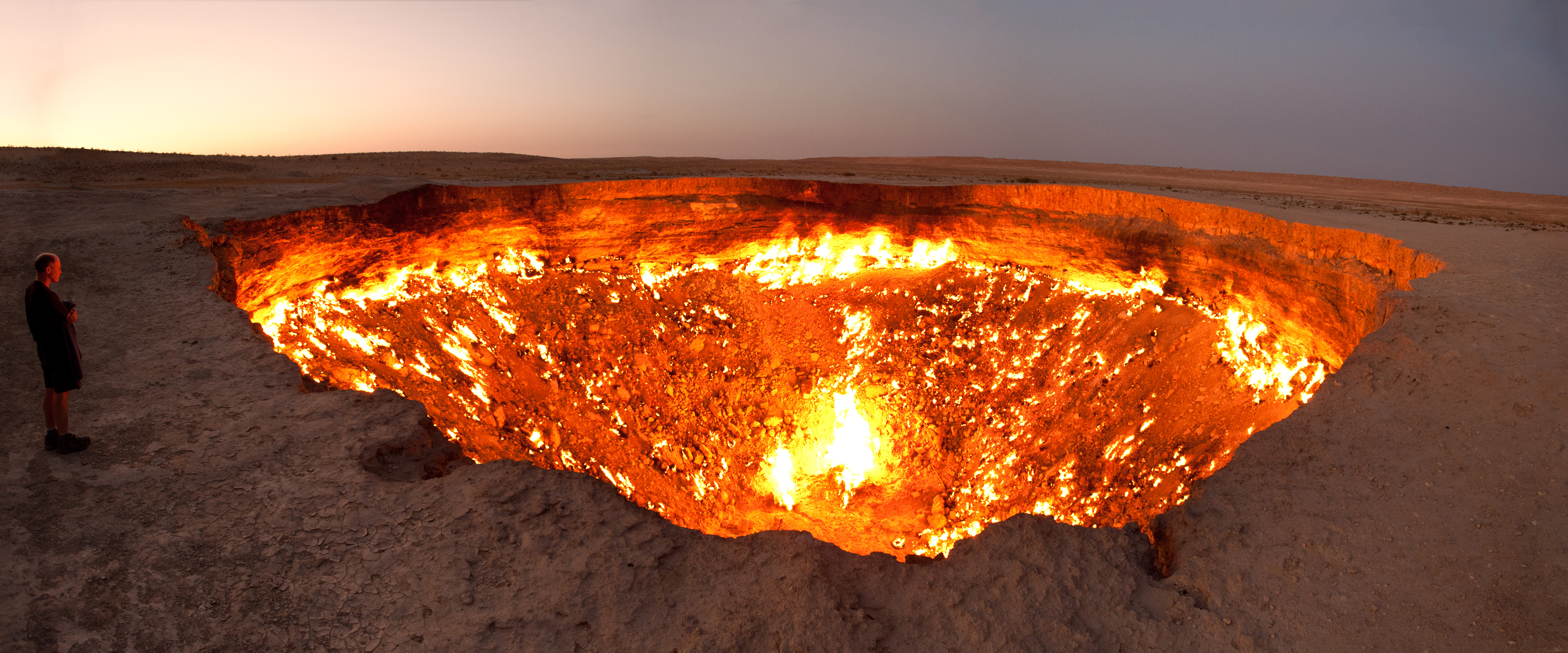
The Darvaza gas crater, also known as the Door to Hell, at night in the Karakum Desert

The Karakum is home to the Darvaza gas crater. Also called the "Door to Hell" or the "Gates of Hell" by locals, it is a crater of natural gas that has been burning since 1971. The crater is a major tourist attraction, with hundreds of visitors arriving each year.

The area has significant oil and natural gas deposits.

== Hydrography ==
To the south the Murghab and Tejen rivers flow out of the Hindu Kush mountains, flow west, and empty into the desert, providing water for irrigation.

The desert is crossed by the second-largest irrigation canal in the world, the Karakum Canal, which brings water from the Amu Darya to southern regions of the desert. Construction on the canal was started in 1954 and completed in 1958. It is 1,375 km (900 mi) in length, and carries 13 to 20 km^{3} of water annually.

== Archaeology ==
Within the Karakum are the Uly Balkan, a mountain range in which archaeologists have found human remains dating back to the Stone Age.

== Economy and resources ==
The oases of Mary and Tejen are noted for cotton growing.

== Transport ==
The desert is crossed by the Trans-Caspian Railway.

== Golden Age Lake ==
Golden Age Lake, locally known as Altyn Asyr köli or alternatively as Karakum Lake, is a man-made lake under construction in the Karashor Depression in the Karakum Desert.

Upon completion, the lake will span 2,000 square kilometres (770 sq mi) with a maximum depth of 70 metres (230 ft), and hold more than 130 cubic kilometers (4600 billion cubic feet) of water. Filling the lake could take 15 years and cost up to $4.5 billion. According to government plans, it is intended to be filled by a 2,650-kilometer (1,650 mi) network of tributary canals. The Dashoguz Collector, spanning a distance of 432 kilometers, traces approximately half of its course along the historic path of the Uzboy River. The Great Turkmen Collector starts in Lebap Province and is 720 km (450 mi) long. They are used for pumping run-off water from irrigated cotton fields towards the lake.

== See also ==
- List of deserts by area
