= Uzboy =

Former river in west Asia

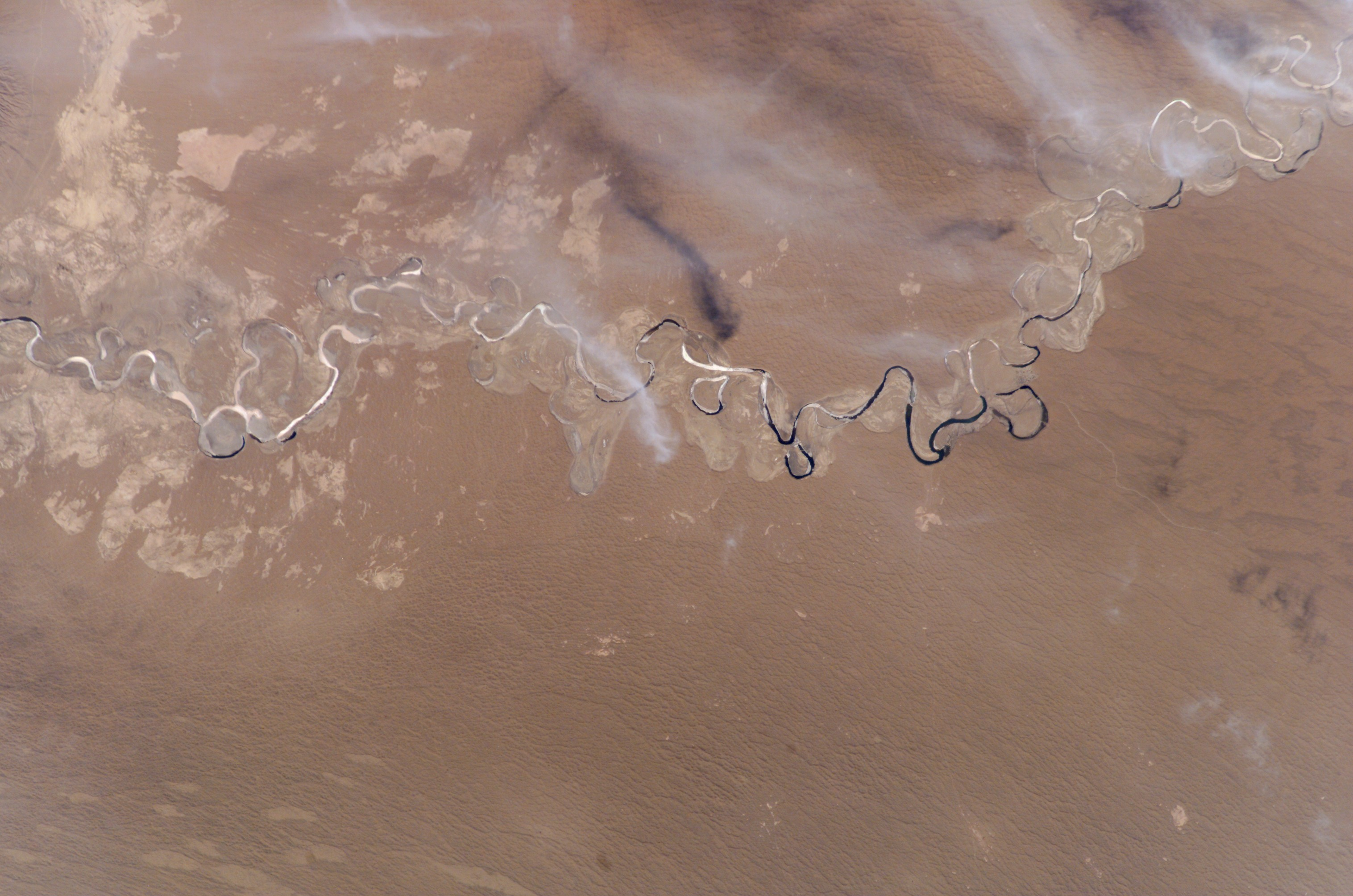
- Satellite view of the Uzboy River in 2007

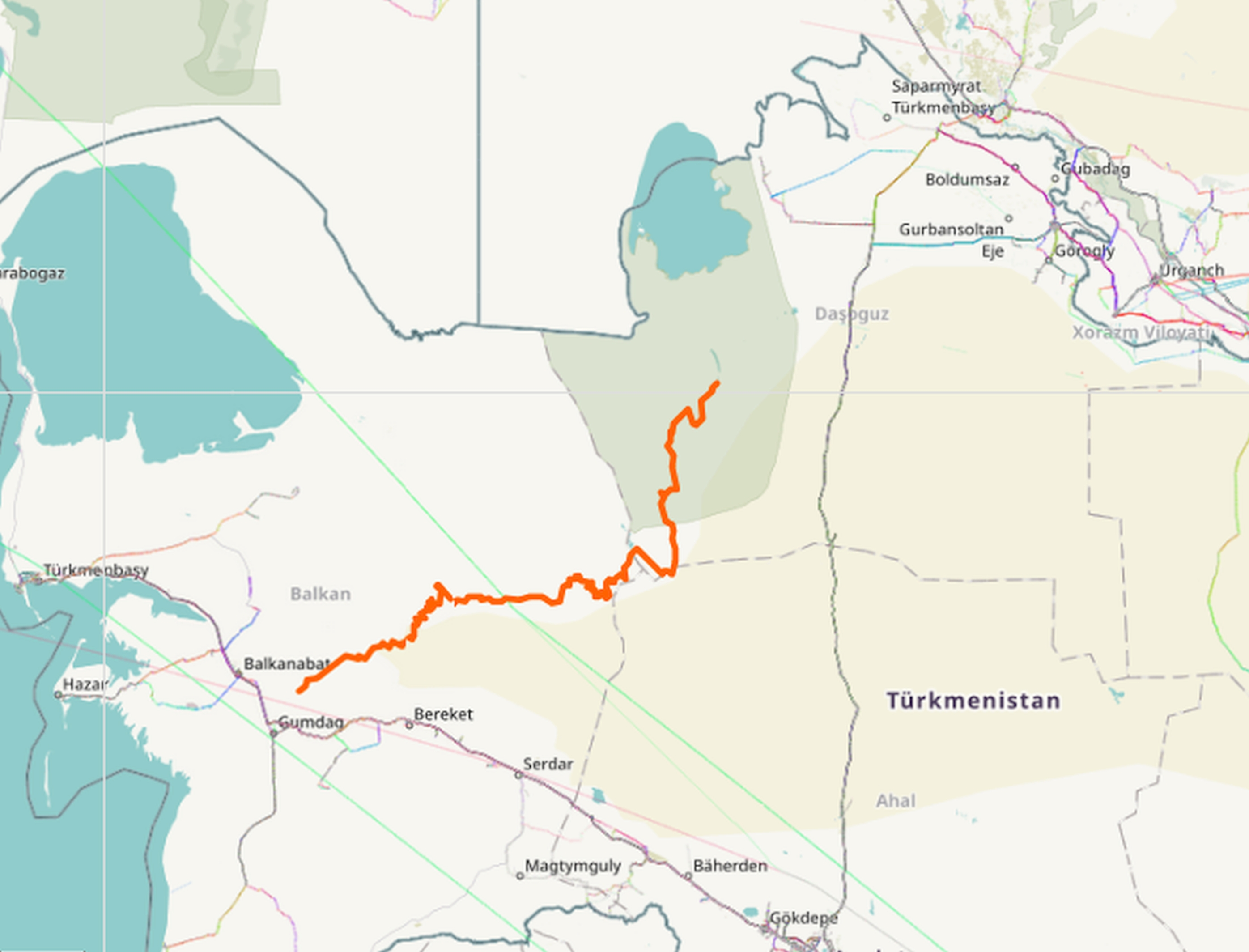
- Current Uzboy riverbed in Turkmenistan

Location
- Country: Turkmenistan

Physical characteristics
- Source
  - coordinates: 41°6′49.7″N 57°35′8.5″E
- Mouth
  - coordinates: 39°21′39.6″N 54°27′10.1″E
- Length: 550 km (340 mi)

The Uzboy (Turkmen: Uzboý) was a distributary of the Amu Darya river which flowed through the northwestern part of the Karakum Desert of Turkmenistan until the 17th century, when it abruptly dried up, eliminating the agricultural population that had thrived along its banks. It was a part of the ancient region of Dahistan.

Now a dry river channel and a center for archaeological excavations, the Uzboy flowed some 750 kilometres (470 mi), from a branch in the Amu Darya River via Sarykamysh Lake to the Caspian Sea. A riverine civilization existed along the banks of the river from at least the 5th century BC until the 17th century AD, when the water which had fed the Uzboy abruptly stopped flowing out of the main course of the Amu Darya. The Uzboy dried up, and the Turkmen tribes which had inhabited the river's banks were abruptly dispersed, the survivors becoming nomadic desert dwellers.

In the early 1950s, construction work started to build a major irrigation canal roughly along the river bed of the former Uzboy. However, the project was abandoned soon after the death of Joseph Stalin in 1953; later on, Karakum Canal was constructed along an entirely different, much more southerly, route.

== History ==
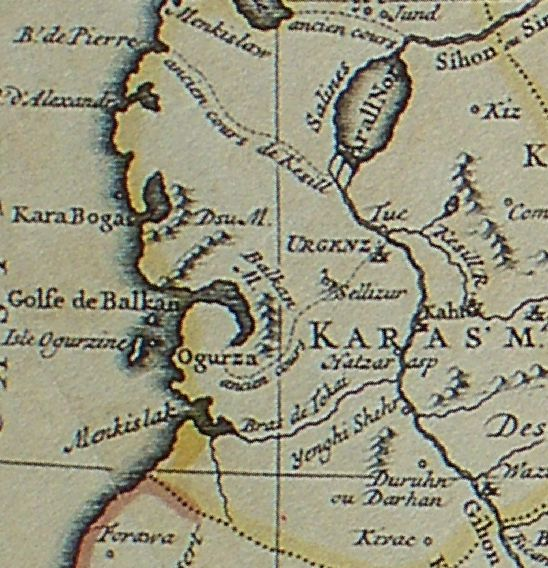
Uzboy (labeled Bras de Tokai) flowing from the Amu Darya (Gihon or Oxus) into the Caspian, shown within the bounds of the Khanate of Khiva (Khwarazm), on a 1734 French map.

Tectonic movements in the Pliocene raised and lowered the region around the Aral Sea. They changed the course of the rivers, mainly the Amu Darya and its tributaries, which included the Uzboy. The Ustyurt Plateau protruded into the Aralo-Caspian lowland as a peninsula. It first separated the Caspian Sea from the Aral Sea near Bala-İşem, then the Uzboy Valley and other natural connecting channels between the two lakes were formed. The development of the coastlines can be reconstructed by studying various transitional deposits of Caspian mollusks, salt deposits from dried-up water bodies (sors) on the former coastlines, salt clay plains (takyrs) and other prehistoric evidence. Researchers and historians have been providing evidence of changes to both lakes due to changes in water volumes and irrigation development since ancient times.

=== Usboi and Western Usboi ===
During this period, the Amu Darya flowed through the Sarykamysh Depression and from there through the Uzboi, whose bed can be traced from the southern edge of the Sarykamysh Depression in the Kaplankyr Nature Reserve, east and south around the Karaschor Depression along the Greater and Lesser Balkans south of the Balkan Gulf into the Caspian Sea. Already in antiquity, Herodotus described it as a branch of the Amu Darya and the medieval authors (Muqaddasiy, Hamdallah, Qazviniy, Hofizi Abru, Abulgʻoziy) also adopted this view.

This connection was maintained until the Pleistocene. Neolithic settlements and pottery from the Bronze Age, as well as sites from the 7th to 5th centuries BC were discovered on the shores of Lake Sarykamysh. The connection was probably interrupted around 3000 BC and 1000 BC, because the water level of the Aral Sea was particularly high at that time. After that, the Amu Darya shifted eastwards again and no longer flowed into the Sarykamysh Delta, but into the Aral Sea. At times (the exact period is unknown), part of the Oxus Delta (Amu Darya Delta) near the Aral Sea was flooded and incorporated the Aral Sea there. The bed of the Western Uzboi is unlikely to have dried up, however. This course was investigated by Vladimir Obruchev in 1886. He found a well south of Lake Samykamish on a road to Khiva: "200 paces west of the Bala-İşem well, on the Sardar-Khiva road. Between the sandy hills, sandstone is not so significant. This masterpiece, Uzboydur, has caused great controversy among the scholars of the world. It has not yet been fully investigated." At that time, it was considered controversial whether the Uzboy actually connected the Amu Darya with the Caspian Sea or whether the valley of the Uzboy was "only a product of the separation of the Aral Sea from the Caspian Sea."

A river culture settled on the banks of the Uzboy from the 5th century BC to the 17th century AD. It is assumed that the northern and western Uzboy existed until the 9th century, and that a dam was then built near Gurganj ( Köneürgenç ) for irrigation purposes and to protect the capital of the Khorezm Shahs. It is likely that it diverted the Amu Darya into the Aral Sea. This assumption is supported not only by reports about the dam but also by the fact that there are no reports of the river flowing into the Caspian Sea from the 10th century until 1310, but there are reports after that until 1575. In addition, a historical peak in the Aral Sea was documented for 1220. The region had one of the most sophisticated irrigation systems in the world until 1221. In that year, Genghis Khan conquered the city in a fierce battle and destroyed the dam. The city was flooded and the Amu Darya again flowed over the Uzboy into the Caspian Sea and the canal system gradually fell into disrepair. As the Amu Darya shifted eastward in recent times, it could no longer reach the Sarykamysh Depression and flowed into the Aral Basin. The Uzboy dried up and the tribes along the river abandoned their settlements. The survivors led a nomadic lifestyle.

Since 1575, it is said, the Amu Darya has flowed back into the Aral Sea. It was assumed that the eastern Oxus broke through some hills. However, dams were also built again to deny the water to the Turkmen. In 1879, by combining older reports, local traditions and the analysis of orographic conditions, it was proven that the river had been diverted from the Caspian Sea by human intervention and not by the uplift of the Aralo-Caspian lowlands. It was thought possible to reactivate this bed as a canal not only for irrigation purposes, but also to "create a navigable waterway for Russia into the heart of its inner Asian provinces." In the 1950s, the Turkmen Main Canal was planned as part of Stalin's "Great Plan for the Transformation of Nature", but was abandoned after Stalin's death. It was to be built from Tachia-Tash (today Taxiatosh ) in the Sarykamysh delta across the former bed of the Uzboi to Krasnowodsk (today Türkmenbaşy). It would have been 1100 km long.

== Glukhovskoy’s account ==
Alexandr Ivanovitch Gloukhovsky wrote in 1893 that the Oxus (Amu-Darya) River seemed to flow into the Caspian Sea via the Uzboy River until the 9th century AD and again between 1220 and 1575, approximately.

At various times in the past one or more branches of the Oxus split off from the Oxus delta and flowed west into the fresh-water Sarykamysh Lake. This was drained south by the Uzboy River about 175 km to near Igdi where it turned and flowed about 290 km west, reaching the Caspian at Krasnovodsk Bay through the Bala-Ishem salt marshes. There was a large waterfall, a place called the Lion’s Jaw and at one point the river disappeared underground for some distance. (Glukhovskoy does not mention it, but Google Earth shows a dry river bed that starts about 100 miles (160 km) west of the Oxus and runs about 400 miles (640 km) west to join the Uzboy near Igdi.)

All geographers, from the ancient Greeks to the early Arabs, reported that the Oxus flowed into the Caspian, although their accounts are vague. From the 10th to the 13th centuries there are no reports of a Caspian mouth. It is thought that a dam was built near the old capital of Konya-Urgench and that this dam was destroyed by the Mongols when they sacked the city in 1220. We again hear of a Caspian mouth from about 1310 to 1575. It is possible that the main current shifted from the Aral to the Caspian, causing the Caspian to rise and the Aral to sink. There may have been a significant population along the Uzboy and farmland in what were later the marshes at the north end of the Oxus delta. It seems that about 1575 the east branch of the Oxus cut through some hills causing the main current to shift to the Aral Sea. Also a dam was built near the old site to retain the remaining water and to deny it to the Turkomans who were in the habit of raiding the Oxus delta. This not only blocked the Uzboy but caused the Sarykamysh to slowly dry up.

Peter the Great heard that it would be possible to destroy the dam and send the Oxus into its old channel, thereby making a waterway from Moscow down the Volga and up the Oxus into the heart of Asia. This led to the 1717 invasion, among other things. Around 1879 Russia sent expeditions to accurately survey the old channel. Glukhovskoy thought that a river diversion would be practical. Either the Sarykamysh could be refilled, which would take about 15 years, or an old river bed could be cleaned out making a canal avoiding the Sary-Kamish depression. The Uzboy would need to be cleared of sand in several places and some dams would be needed. The whole project would cost between 15 and 27 million rubles. (An attempt to realize this was made around 1950-1953.)

== Current environmental pollution in the Usboi River basin ==
At least the main branch of the Uzboi, which was particularly important for people in the Holocene, has once again become important as a drainage channel due to current environmental problems. In 1971, reckless irrigation projects along the Amu Darya caused water to once again break through underground to Lake Sarykamysh, which was not stopped. This reactivated the underground supply of the Uzboi, which had been channeling water from the Amu Darya into the Caspian Sea at least since the 4th millennium BC until the first half of the first millennium BC.

The modern irrigation systems are causing the groundwater level to rise again, causing salt to be washed to the surface. Around 80 percent of agricultural land is now salinized. With the start of construction of a new drainage system and two collecting channels to the Karaschor Depression in 2000, attempts are being made to drain the salty groundwater before it can salinize the surrounding area. In addition to the extensive drying up of the Aral Sea, there are further dangers in that over-fertilization and pesticide pollution are not only damaging the Golden Age lake, but are also polluting the Caspian Sea. In addition, the peasant community has demanded that the salt be washed out with more and more water from the Amu Darya. This would then be lacking in Uzbekistan and is therefore geopolitically explosive. The problem of soil salinization also affects the irrigation area around the non-concrete Karakum Canal.

== As namesake ==
The Uzboi Vallis riverbed on Mars was named after the Usboi. It was photographed by the 2001 Mars Odyssey orbiter on May 31, 2014.

== See also ==
- Türkmenbaşy Gulf
- Rivers in Turkmenistan

== Literature ==
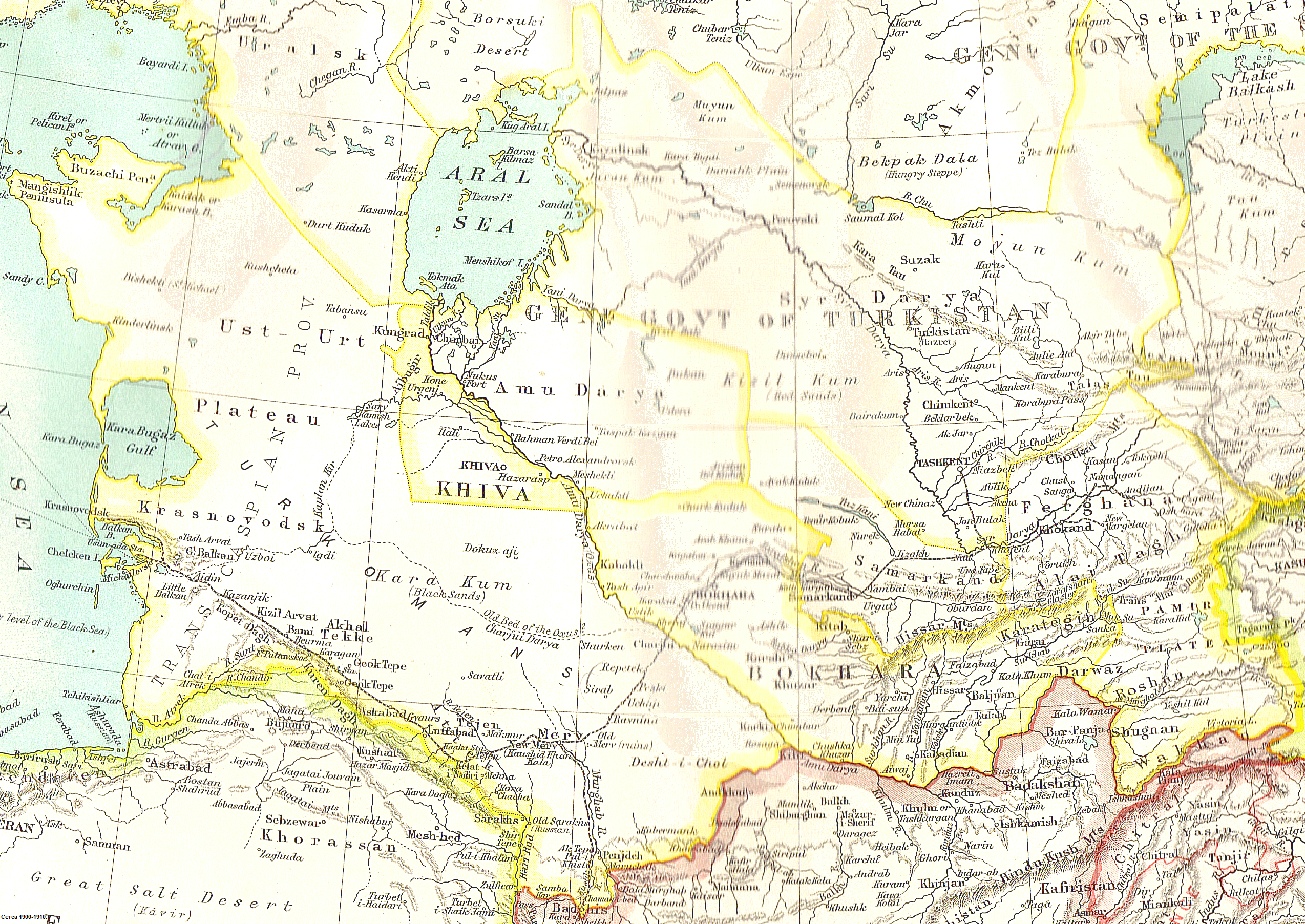
1903 map showing the 'old bed of the Oxus'.

- Tsvetsinskaya E.A., Vainberg B.I., V. Glushko E.V. "An integrated assessment of landscape evolution, long-term climate variability, and land use in the Amudarya Prisarykamysh delta", Journal of Arid Environments (2002) 51: 363–381
- Muradov, Ruslan "Mysteries of Dehistan", Turkmenistan (2009):
- Wladimir Kunin: Conqueror of the Desert. Brockhaus, Leipzig, later edition (around 1959)
