= Karashor Depression =

Coordinates: 40°44′N 56°47′E

Karashor depression

The Karashor Depression (also, Garashor Depression) is a hundred kilometre long natural bowl in the northwest of Turkmenistan. Maximum width is about twenty kilometre.

== Golden Age Lake ==
In October 2000 a project was started to create the Golden Age Lake. In July 2009 an opening ceremony was held.
