= Karakum Canal =

Largest irrigation and water supply canals in the world

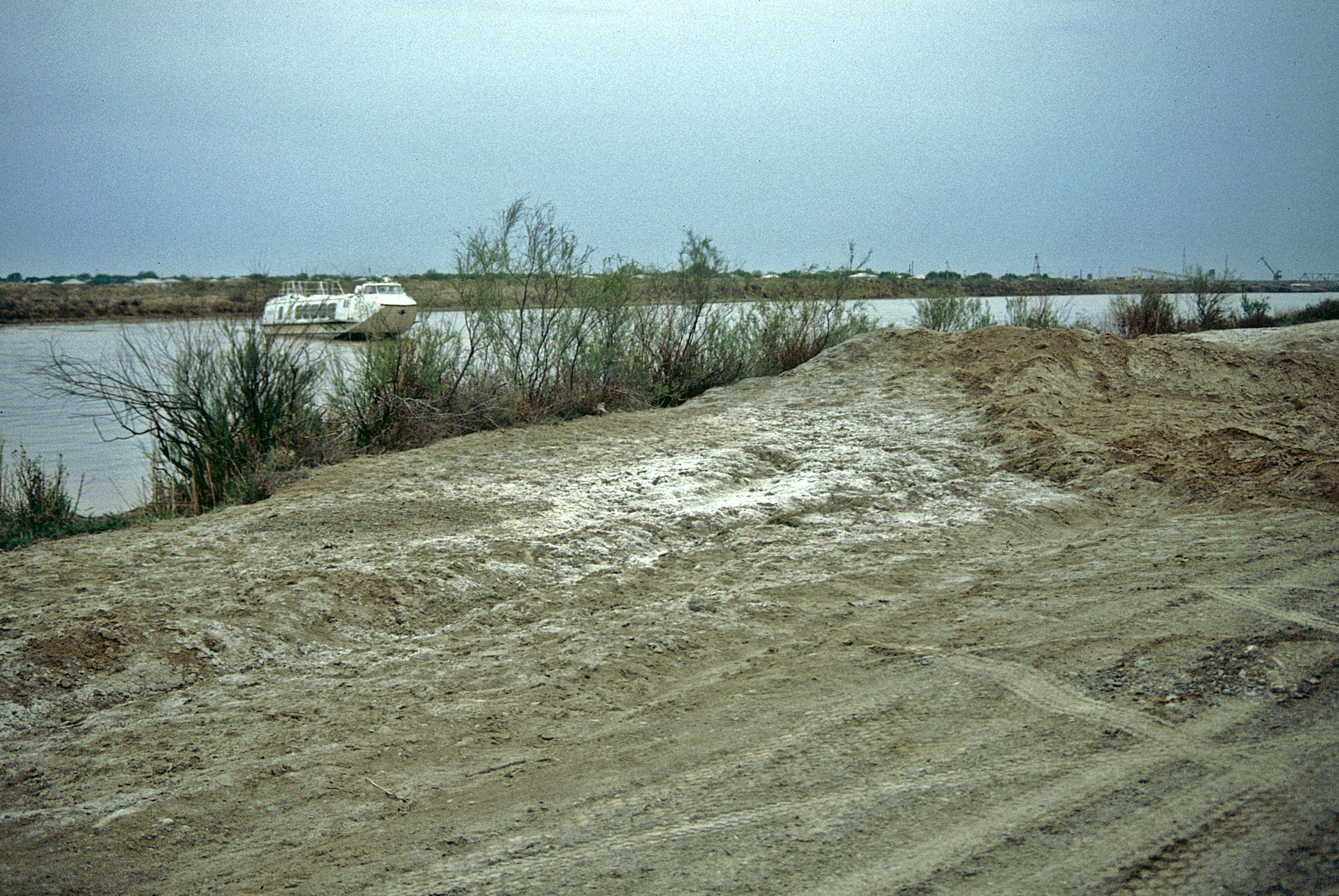
- A ship crossing the canal
- Interactive map of Karakum Canal
- Country: Turkmenistan

Specifications
- Length: 1,375 km (854 miles)

Geography
- Direction: West
- Start point: Amu-Darya
- End point: near Etrek
- Beginning coordinates: 37°34′23″N 65°42′25″E
- Ending coordinates: 37°42′34″N 54°48′07″E

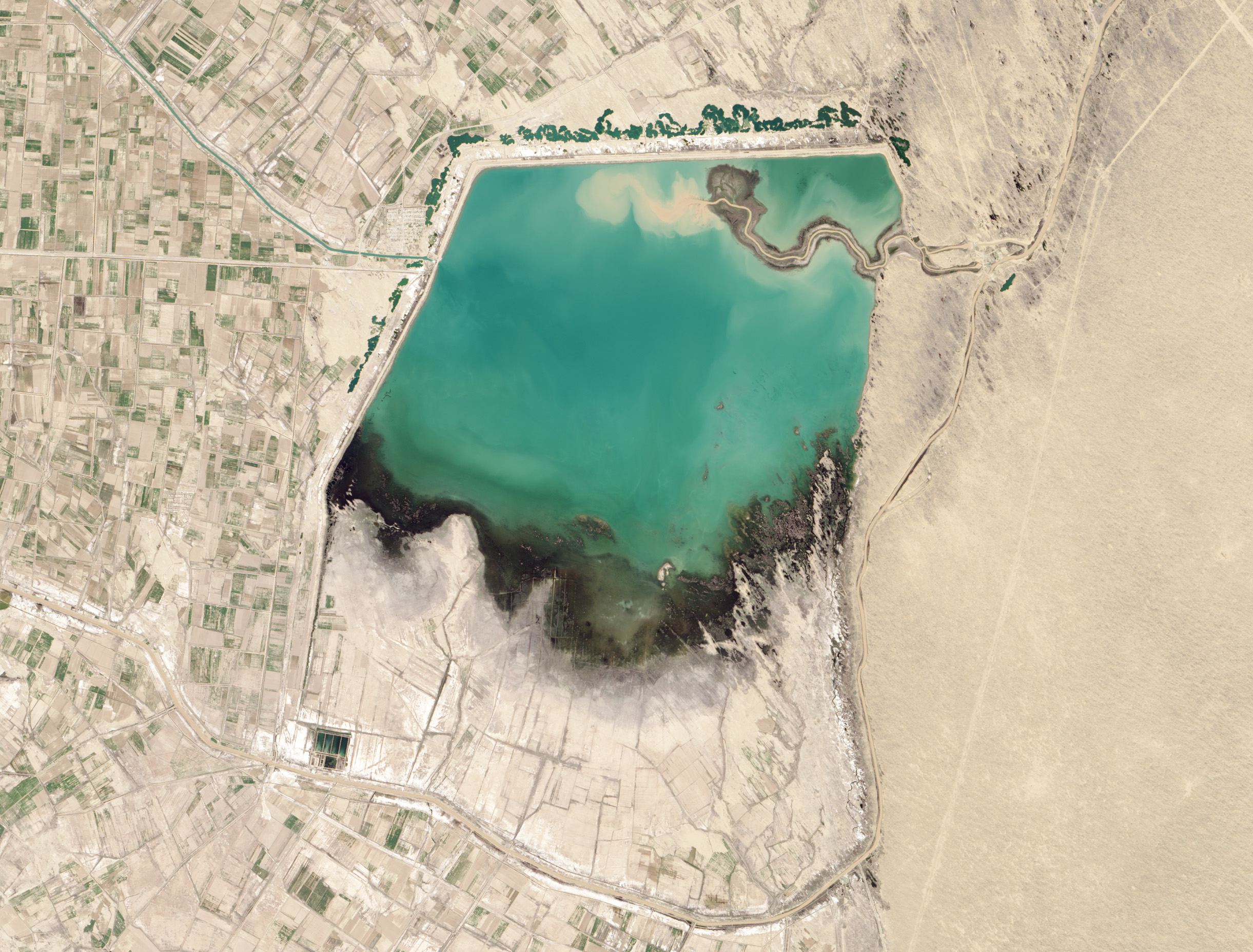
The Karakum Canal (lower right) and the Hanhowuz Reservoir, 2014.

The Karakum Canal (Qaraqum Canal, Kara Kum Canal, Garagum Canal; Russian: Каракумский канал, Karakumskiy Kanal, Turkmen: Garagum kanaly, قاراقۇم کانالیٛ, Гарагум каналы) in Turkmenistan is one of the largest irrigation and water supply canals in the world. Started in 1954, and completed in 1958, it is navigable over much of its 1,375-kilometre (854 mi) length, and carries 13 cubic kilometres (3.1 mi^{3}) of water annually from the Amu-Darya River across the Karakum Desert in Turkmenistan. The canal opened up huge new tracts of land to agriculture, especially to cotton monoculture heavily promoted by the Soviet Union, and supplying Ashgabat with a major source of water. The canal is also a major factor leading to the Aral Sea environmental disaster. The Soviet Union planned to extend the canal to the Caspian Sea at some time.

== History ==
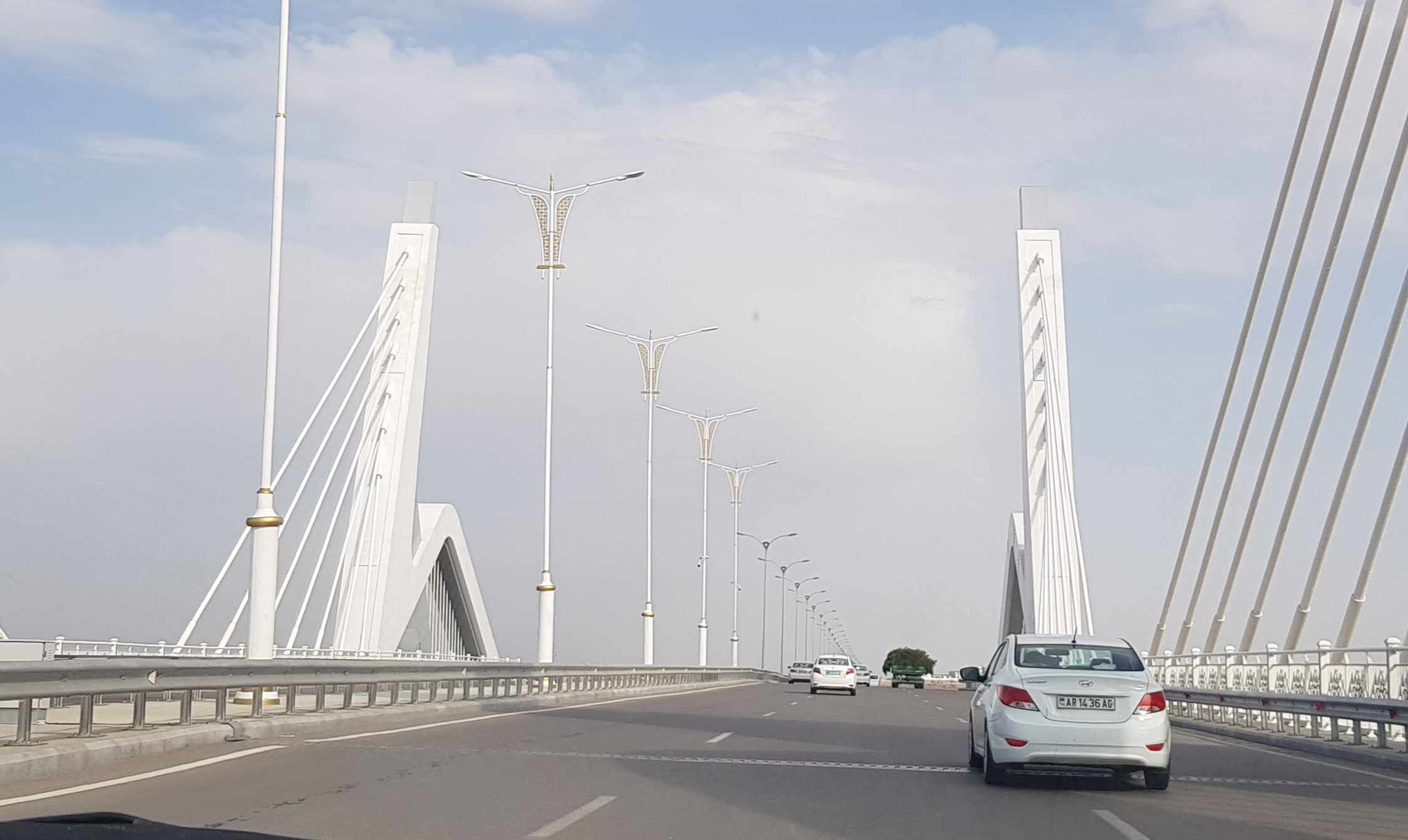
Bridge over Garagum River in Turkmenistan

The current Karakum Canal was not the first major attempt to bring the Amu-Darya water to the Karakums. In the early 1950s, construction began on the Main Turkmen Canal (Russian: Главный Туркменский канал), which would start at a much more northerly location (near Nukus), and run southwest toward Krasnovodsk. The canal would have used around 25 percent of the Amu-Darya's water. The works were abandoned after the death of Joseph Stalin, the current Karakum Canal route being chosen instead. Reservoirs such as Hanhowuz Reservoir were created to help regulate it.

== Important cities ==
- Ashgabat
- Bereket
- Gyzylarbat (1992–1999 and from 2022 onwards, formerly Serdar 1999–2022)
