= Szwajcaria Kaszubska =

Coordinates: 54.3333°N 18.0000°E

Szwajcaria Kaszubska Kaszëbskô Szwajcariô
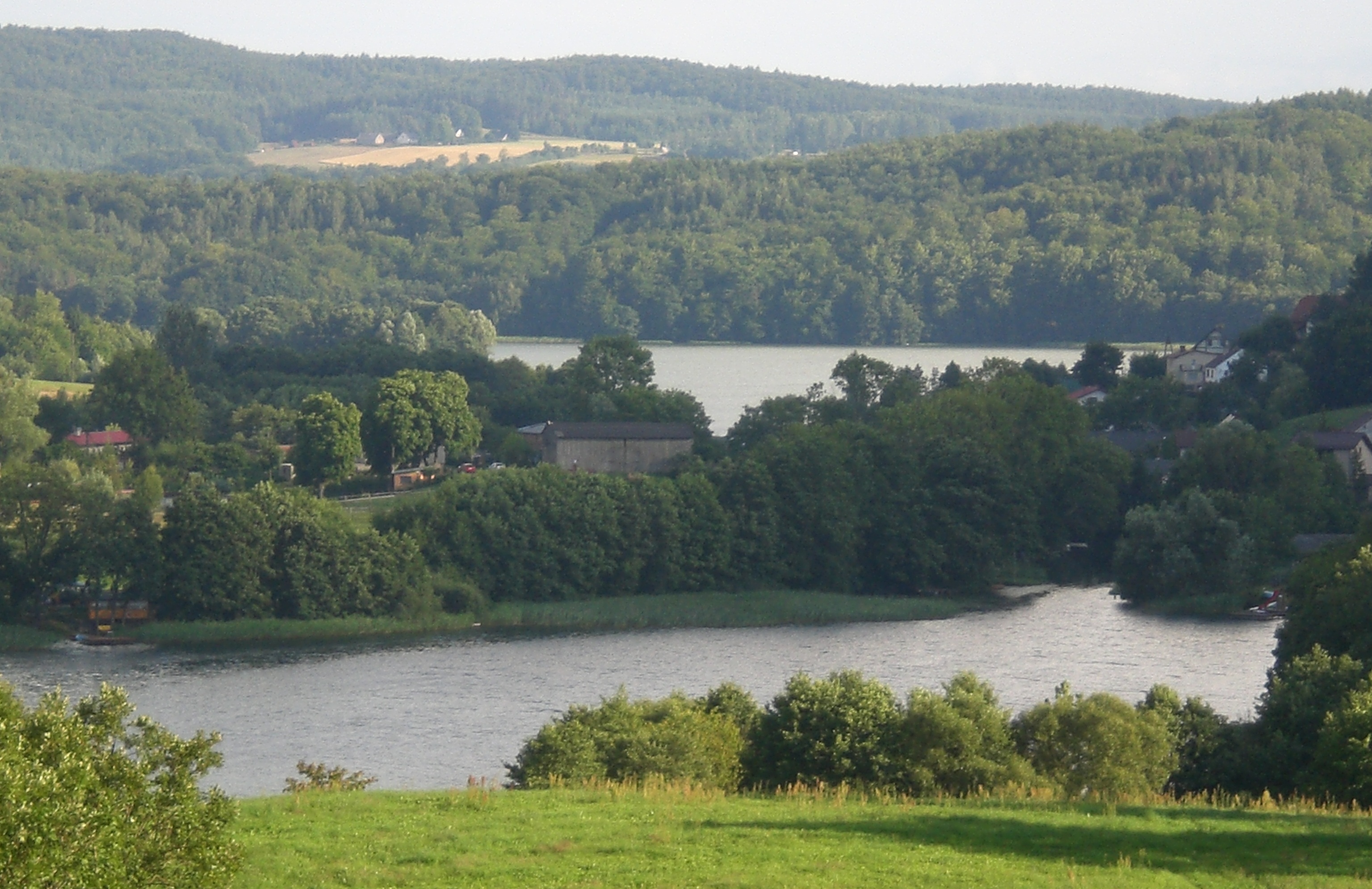
- Brodnica Dolna in the region of Szwajcaria Kaszubska

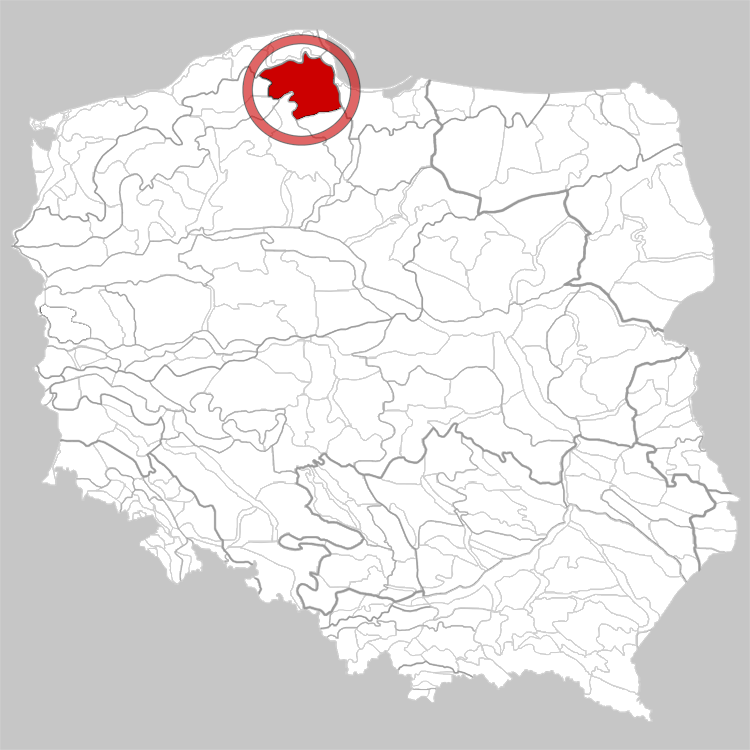
- Location of Szwajcaria Kaszubska in Poland
- Country: Poland

Szwajcaria Kaszubska (Kaszëbskô Szwajcariô, Kashubian and German: Kaschubische Schweiz) (literally: Kashubian Switzerland) is the northern region of the Kashubian Lake District. In the region of the Kashubian Switzerland is located the highest point in the Polish Lowland (Niż Polski) - Wieżyca (329 metres above sea level).

Main rivers: Radunia, Łeba, Słupia and Wierzyca.

== See also ==
- Regions whose name incorporates "Switzerland"
