= Sarygamysh Lake =

Lake in Central Asia

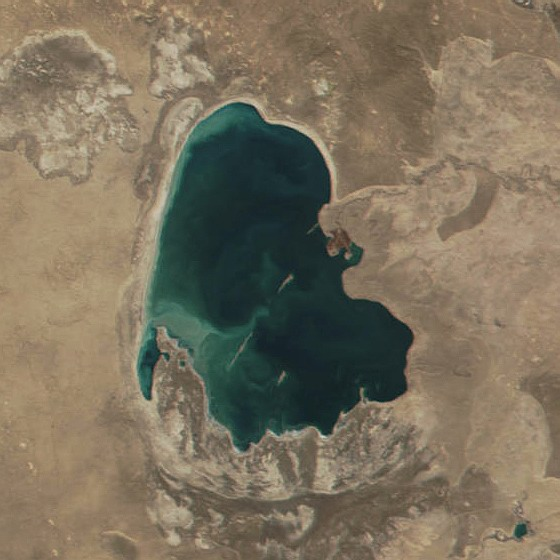
- December 2001

- Location within Uzbekistan Location within Turkmenistan
- Interactive map of Sarygamysh Lake
- Coordinates: 42°00′N 57°20′E
- Basin countries: Turkmenistan and Uzbekistan
- Max. length: 125 km (78 mi)
- Max. width: 90 km (56 mi)
- Surface area: 3,955 km^{2} (1,527 sq mi)
- Average depth: 8 m (26 ft)
- Max. depth: 40 m (130 ft)
- Water volume: 68.56 km^{3} (16.45 cu mi)
- Surface elevation: 5 m (16 ft)

Sarygamysh Lake, also Sarykamysh or Sary-Kamysh, is the largest lake in Turkmenistan located about midway between the Caspian Sea and the Aral Sea. A quarter of the lake's area is in Uzbekistan. The Sarykamysh basin and the Sarykamysh delta of the Amu Darya river are physical and geographical nature regions of the Daşoguz Region of Turkmenistan.

Up until the 17th century, the lake was fed by the Uzboy River, a distributary of the Amu Darya River, which continued on to the Caspian Sea. Today, its main source of water is a canal from the Amu Darya, but also the runoff water from surrounding irrigated lands, containing high levels of pesticides, herbicides and heavy metals.

== Etymology ==
The name of the lake comes from the Turkic words sari (yellow) and qamish (depression), a reference to the yellow color of silt and salt in the old dried up basin before its flooding by the Soviets. The modern Turkmen authorities wish to "Turkmenize" the name by contending that the name is Turkmen sarykamysh 'yellow reed'.

== History ==
Throughout its history, Sarygamysh Lake has disappeared several times and re-emerged, depending on the arrival of the Amu Darya waters. The drying out periods of the lake were associated with the confluence of the river into the Aral Sea. The lake existed at the end of the Neogene period before 2.5 million years ago in the upper anthropocene at an elevation of 58 m (190 ft), when its area covered, including the modern Assake-Audan basin, and then in the 14th to 16th centuries at the level of 50–62 m (164–203 ft). It was first discovered and charted by the Russian geographer Nikolai Petrusevich in 1876. The last time the waters of the Amu Darya directly entered the basin was during the flood of 1878.

Since the beginning of the 1960s, Sarykamysh Lake has been filled with collector-drainage waters; feeding was carried out through the Daryalyk collector, while water from the farmland of the left bank of the Amu Darya was used.

In the years from 2018 to 2024, satellite imagery shows that the lake is shrinking again, possibly due to the prolonged droughts and lower inflow of water from the Amu Darya.

== Fauna ==
The ichthyofauna of Sarykamysh Lake was formed by species that penetrated from the Amu Darya and water bodies of the adventitious drainage network. For the most part, the lake is inhabited by native species of the Aral-Amu Darya basin and immigrant species, both spontaneously penetrated and purposefully transferred to the reservoir for fish breeding purposes in 1969–1974. In 1980–1987, 27 species lived here, and in 2018 there were already 32, of which 34.4% are immigrant species. In total, during the existence of the lake, 36 species of various representatives of ichthyofauna were recorded in it, including carp, catfish and snakehead. At the end of 2020, two tons of carp, silver carp and grass carp fry were released into Sarykamysh Lake in the territory of the Dashoguz velayat of Turkmenistan.

=== Birds ===
Sarygamysh Lake is also inhabited by such bird species as white swans, pink and curly pelicans and cormorants. It regularly supports more than 20,000 waterfowl and waterbirds. The area within Turkmenistan has been recognised as an Important Bird Area by BirdLife International.
