= Mecklenburg Switzerland =

Landscape in northern Germany

Coordinates: 53.7548°N 12.6219°E

Mecklenburg Switzerland (German: Mecklenburgische Schweiz) is a landscape in the middle of the German state of Mecklenburg-Vorpommern, north of the Mecklenburg Lake District and immediately northwest of Lake Malchin and Lake Kummerow. The region lies northwest of the line from Lake Malchin via the Dahmen Canal and Lake Kummerow to the Peene(canal) near Neukalen and from there southeast of the line from Lelkendorf via Lake Teterow, Teterow and Groß Wokern to the Malchin Basin. However, there is no precise definition of its boundaries. The majority of the landscape lies within the Mecklenburg Switzerland and Lake Kummerow Nature Park. Its attraction include its unspoilt nature, the hills, its villages that have preserved their original character and its castles. Some 19% of Mecklenburg Switzerland is woodland and 10% is water.

== Towns and villages ==
The towns and villages of this landscape are:

- Alt Sührkow
- Dahmen
- Groß Roge
- Groß Wokern
- Hohen Demzin
- Langhagen
- Lelkendorf
- Malchin
- Neukalen
- Schorssow
- Teterow
- Thürkow

== Image gallery ==
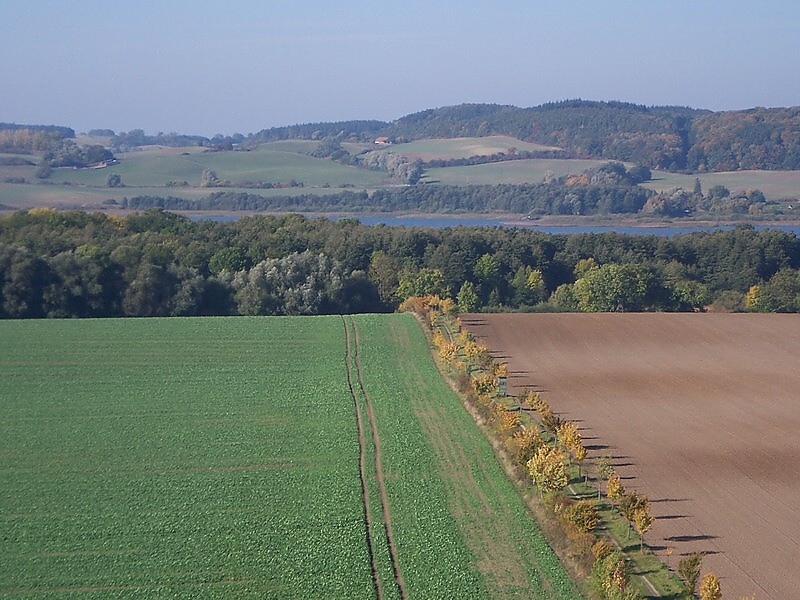
Ostberg on Lake Malchin seen from Basedow

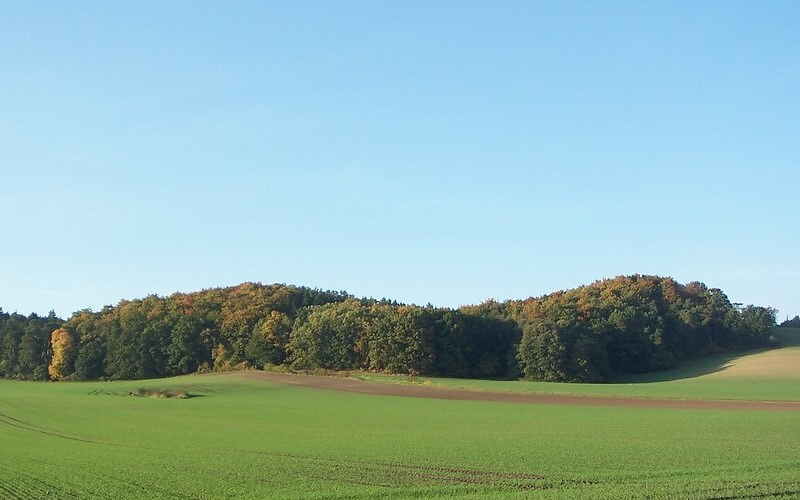
Mecklenburg Switzerland by Lake Malchin

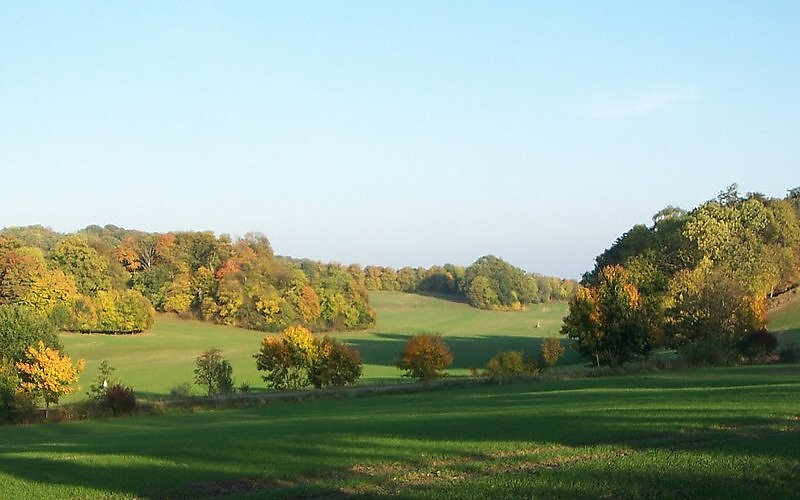
Mecklenburg Switzerland near Remplin

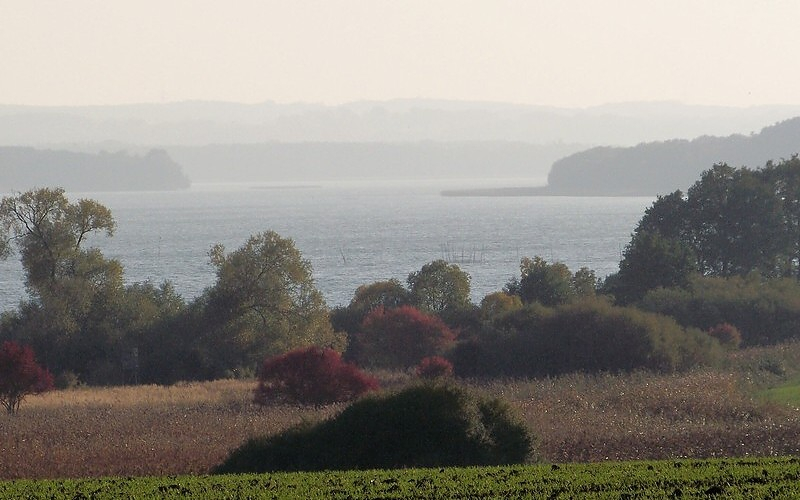
Lake Malchin from Wendischhagen

== See also ==
- Regions whose name incorporates "Switzerland"

== Literature ==
- Jens Klocksin: Reiseführer Mecklenburgische Schweiz. Land und Leute zwischen Müritz und Demmin, Güstrow und Neubrandenburg. Bäßler, Berlin 1998. ISBN 3-930388-05-7
- Rund um die Mecklenburgische Schweiz. Karte M 1:60.000; Ampel-Verlag, Berlin
