= Peene Valley =

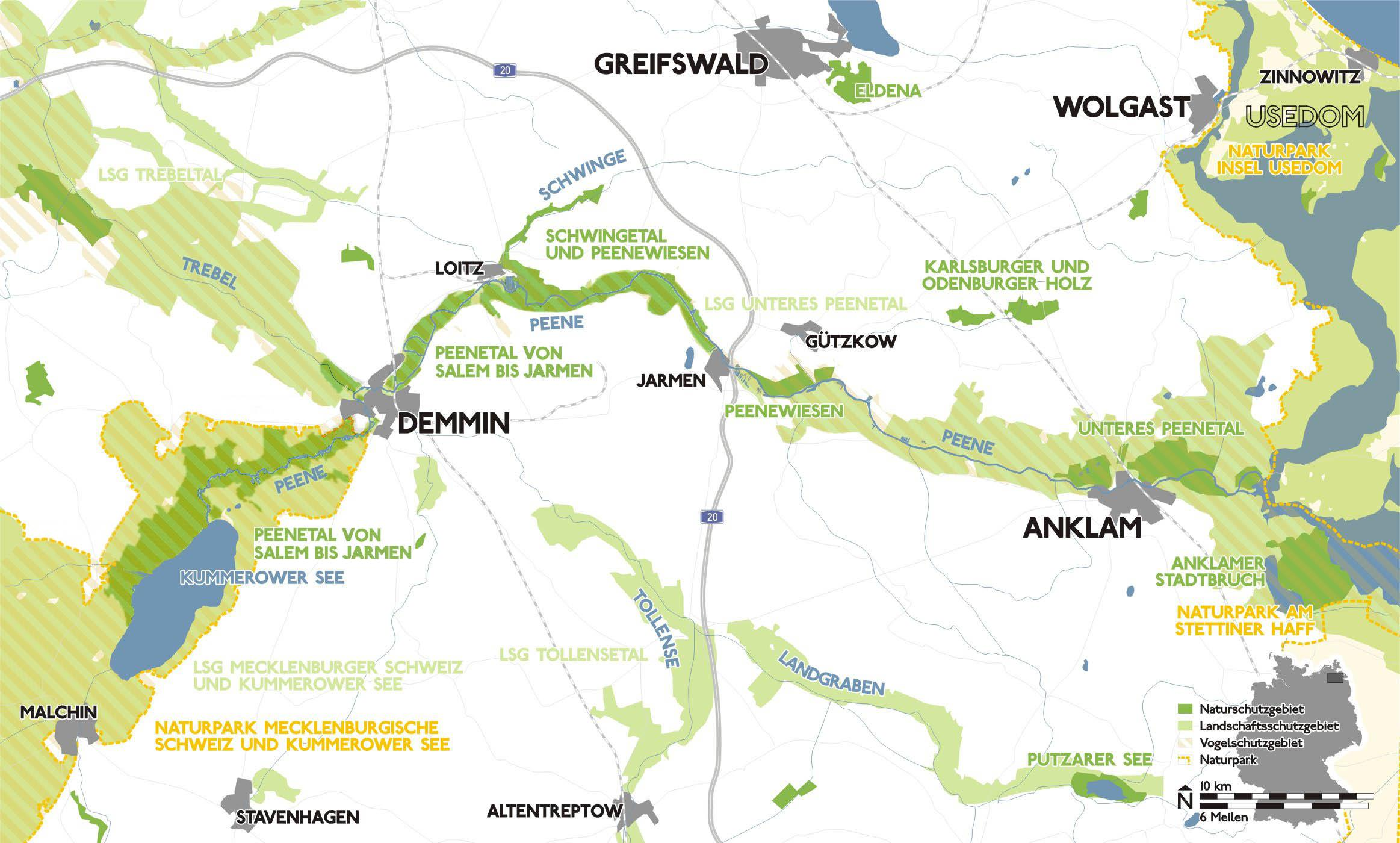
The Peene Valley with its reserves

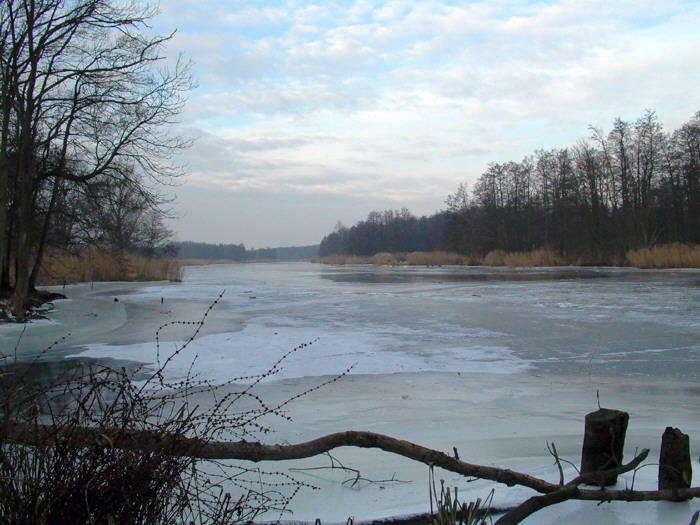
The Peene near Stolpe

The Peene Valley (German: Peenetal) is a landscape in West Pomerania in the German state of Mecklenburg-Vorpommern. It covers the area on either side of the river Peene in the districts of Mecklenburgische Seenplatte and Vorpommern-Greifswald as the river makes its way from Lake Kummerow past the towns of Dargun, Demmin, Loitz, Jarmen, Gützkow and Anklam to its mouth on the Peenestrom.

The landscape of the Peene Valley has been little impacted by industry and other human activities and has a large variety of animal and plant species. It is therefore a nature area of statewide importance and much of the region is subject to nature and landscape conservation measures. It has a core zone of about 20,000 hectares and a total area of about 45,000 hectares and is thus the largest contiguous fen region of Europe.

Thanks to its wilderness and intact nature, the river Peene and its valley is often referred to as "the Amazon of the North".

== Literature ==
- Mike Stegemann, Frank Hennicke: Errichtung und Sicherung schutzwürdiger Teile von Natur und Landschaft mit gesamtstaatlich repräsentativer Bedeutung. Projekt: Peenetal/ Peene-Haff-Moor, Mecklenburg-Vorpommern. In: Natur und Landschaft. Issue 7/8, 1991. Bundesamt für Naturschutz, p. 287–294, ISSN 0028-0615.
- Barbara Havenstein, Frank Hennicke, Mike Stegemann, Jens Kulbe (Autoren), Zweckverband „Peenetal-Landschaft“ Anklam (Herausgeber): Natur- und Wanderführer Peenetal. Hoffmann-Druck GmbH, Wolgast 1998.
- Erich Hoyer: Naturführer Insel Usedom. Mit Haffküste, Ueckermünder Heide und unterem Peenetal. Verlag Erich Hoyer, Galenbeck 2001, ISBN 3-929192-13-6.
- Frieder Jelen: Ein Nationalpark im Peenetal. Wird eine Vision Wirklichkeit? In: Nationalpark. Wildnis - Mensch - Landschaft. 1/2006. Verein der Freunde des Ersten Deutschen Nationalparks Bayerischer Wald e.V, p. 4–7.
