= Kösterbeck =

Kösterbeck may refer to:

- Kösterbeck (river), Germany
- Kösterbeck (nature reserve), Germany
