= Peene =

River in Germany

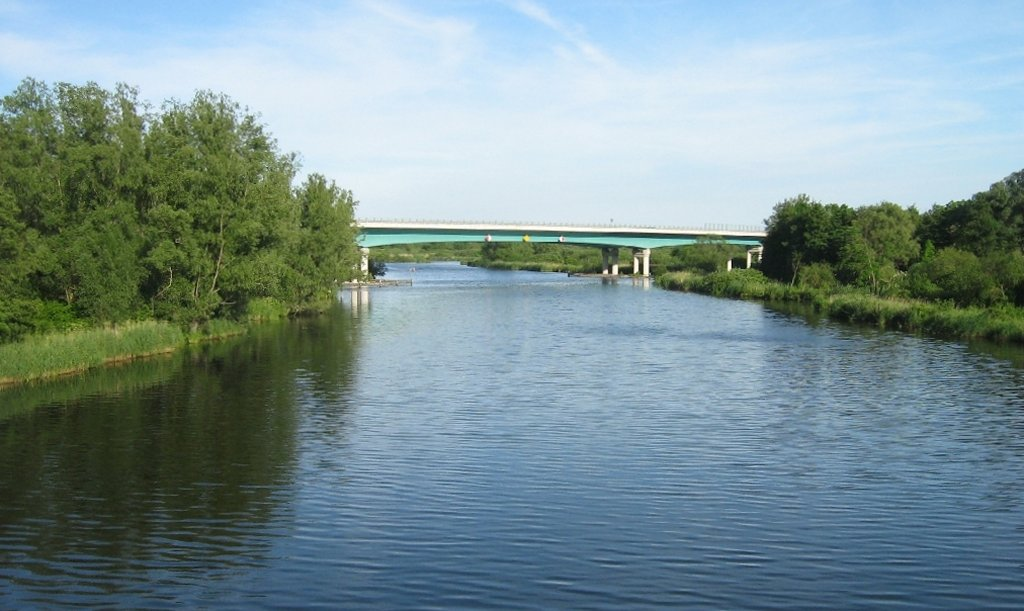
- Peene river near Jarmen

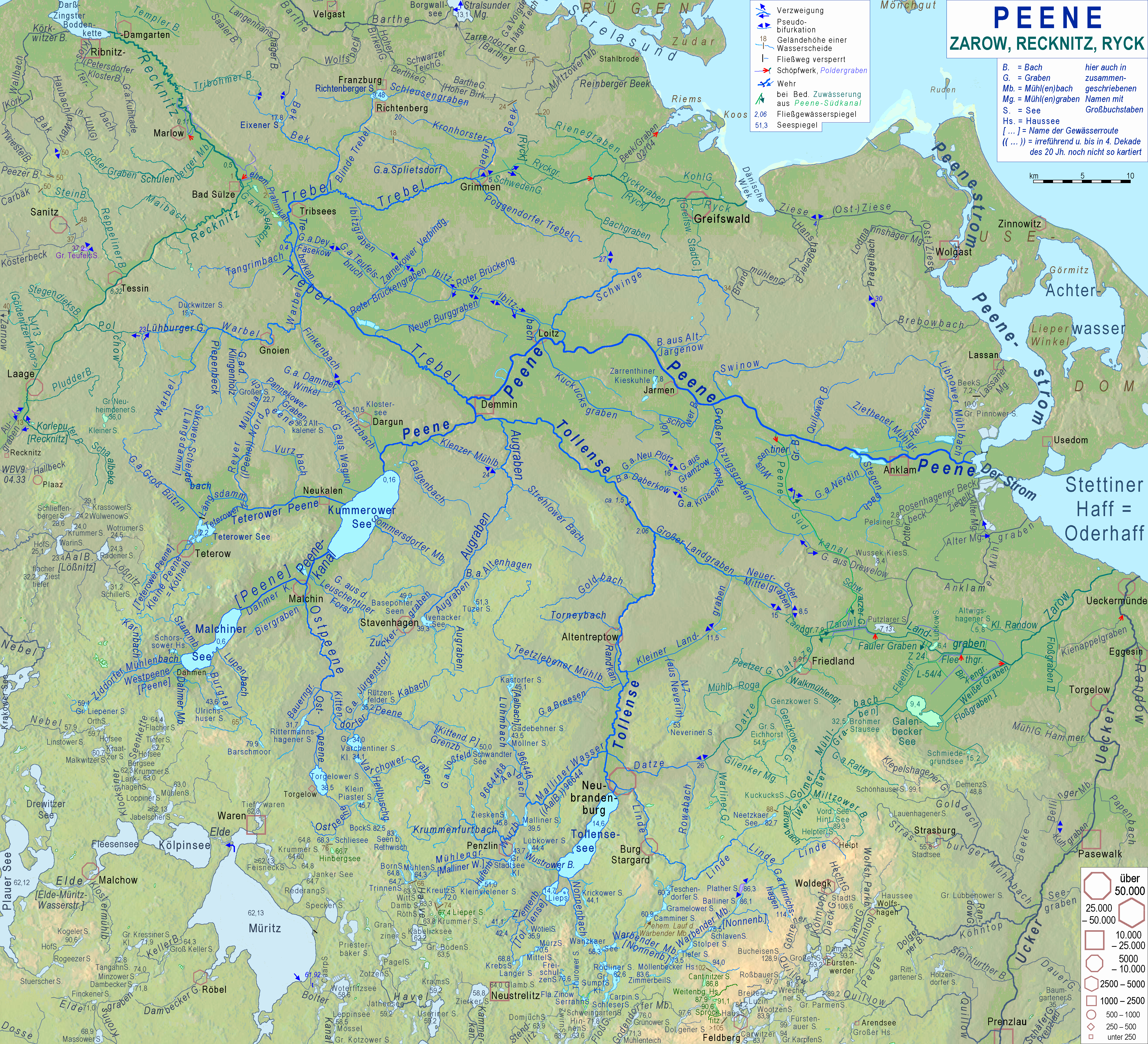
- Peene river, its affluents, and Peenestrom strait

Location
- Country: Germany
- State: Mecklenburg-Vorpommern
- Cities: Demmin, Anklam

Physical characteristics
- Source: Westpeene
  - location: Vollrathsruhe
  - elevation: 30 m (98 ft)
- 2nd source: Ostpeene
  - location: Schloen
  - elevation: 80 m (260 ft)
- 3rd source: Kleine Peene (Teterower Peene)
  - location: Groß Wokern
  - elevation: 85 m (279 ft)
- Mouth: Peenestrom
  - location: Anklam
  - coordinates: 53°51′46″N 13°48′52″E
  - elevation: 0 m (0 ft)
- Length: 138.5 km (86.1 mi)
- Basin size: 5,110 km^{2} (1,970 sq mi)
- Discharge
  - average: 20.6 m^{3}/s (730 cu ft/s)

Basin features
- Tributaries
  - left: Trebel
  - right: Tollense

The Peene (German: [ˈpeːnə]; Polish: Piana) is a river in Germany.

== Geography ==
The Westpeene, with the Ostpeene as its longer tributary, and the Kleine Peene/Teterower Peene (with a Peene without specification (or Nordpeene) as its smaller and shorter affluent) flows into Kummerower See (Lake Kummerow), and from there as Peene proper to Anklam and into the Oder Lagoon.

The western branch of the Oder River, which separates the island of Usedom from the German mainland, is often also called Peene, but actually is considered a part of the Baltic Sea called the Peenestrom. It is one of three channels connecting the Oder Lagoon with the Bay of Pomerania of the Baltic Sea. (The other two are the Świna and the Dziwna.)

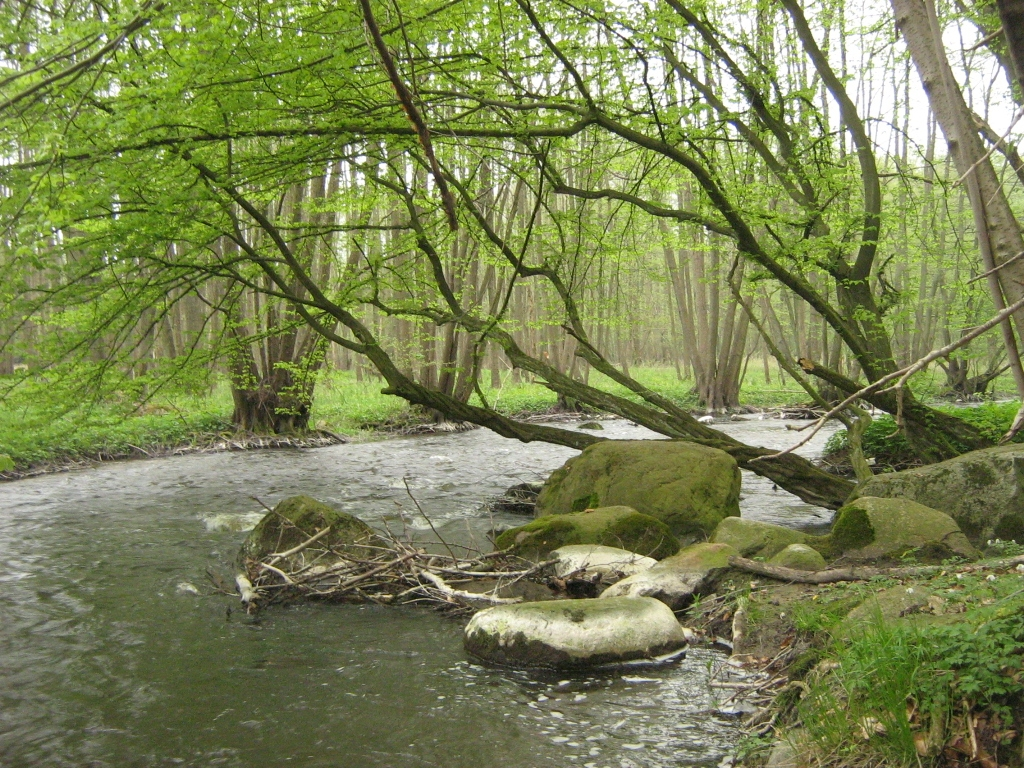
Ostpeene

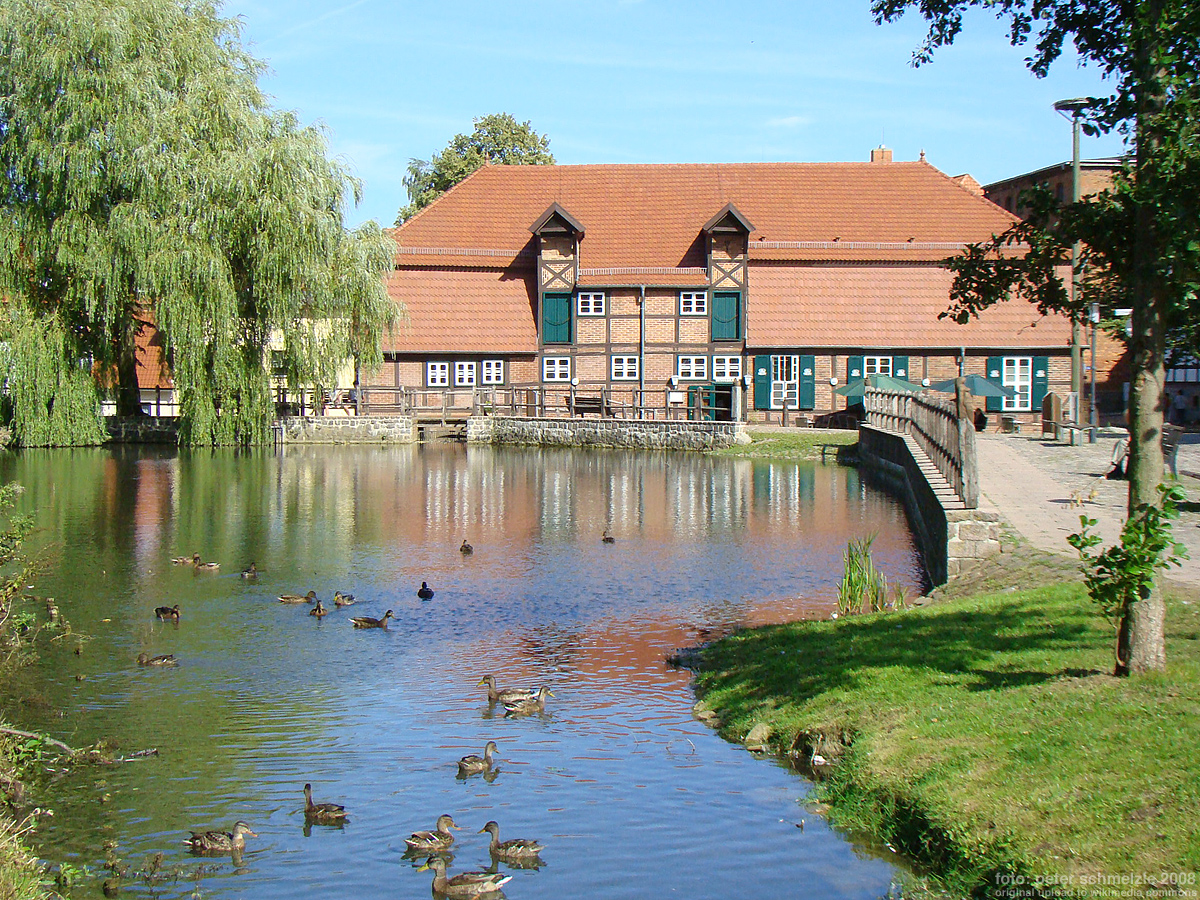
Old watermill on Kleine Peene in Teterow

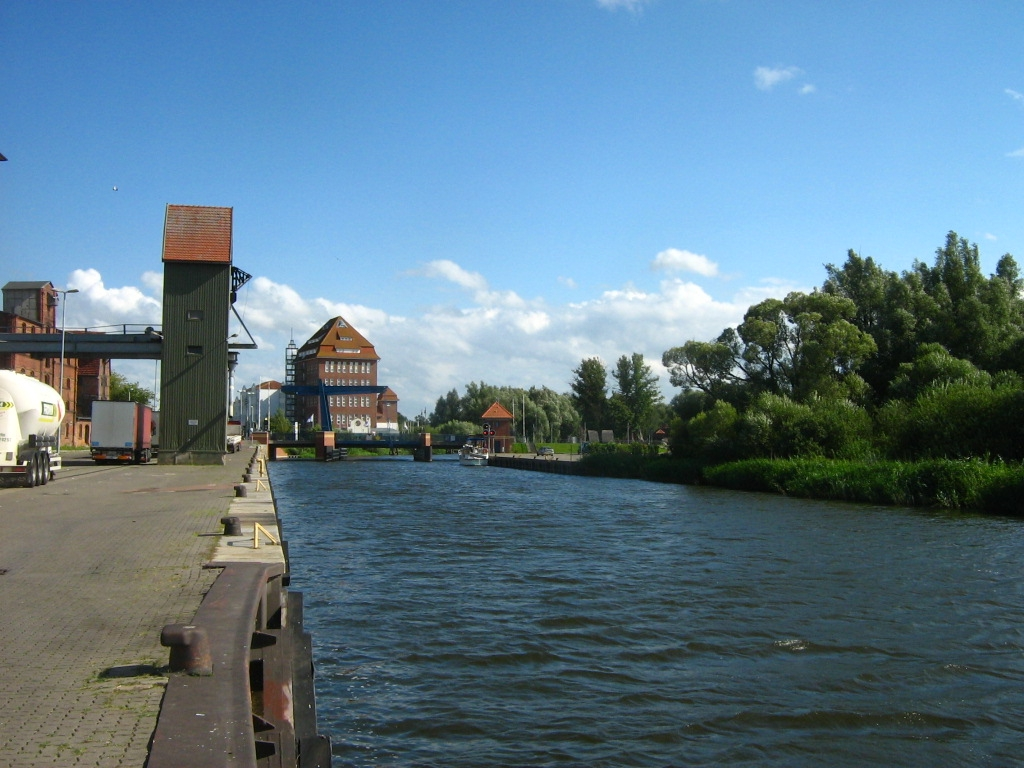
Peene harbour in Demmin

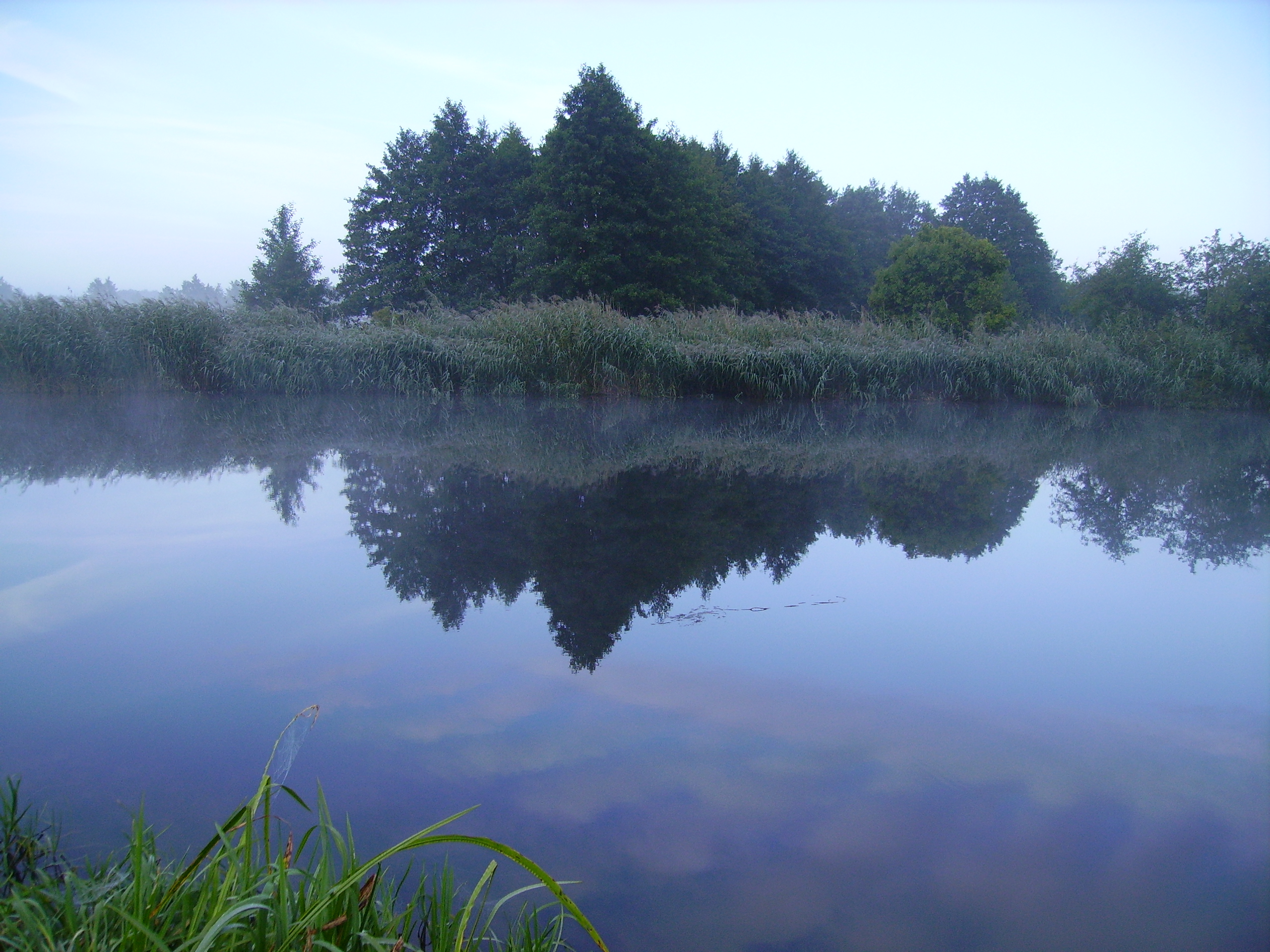
Peene river near Loitz

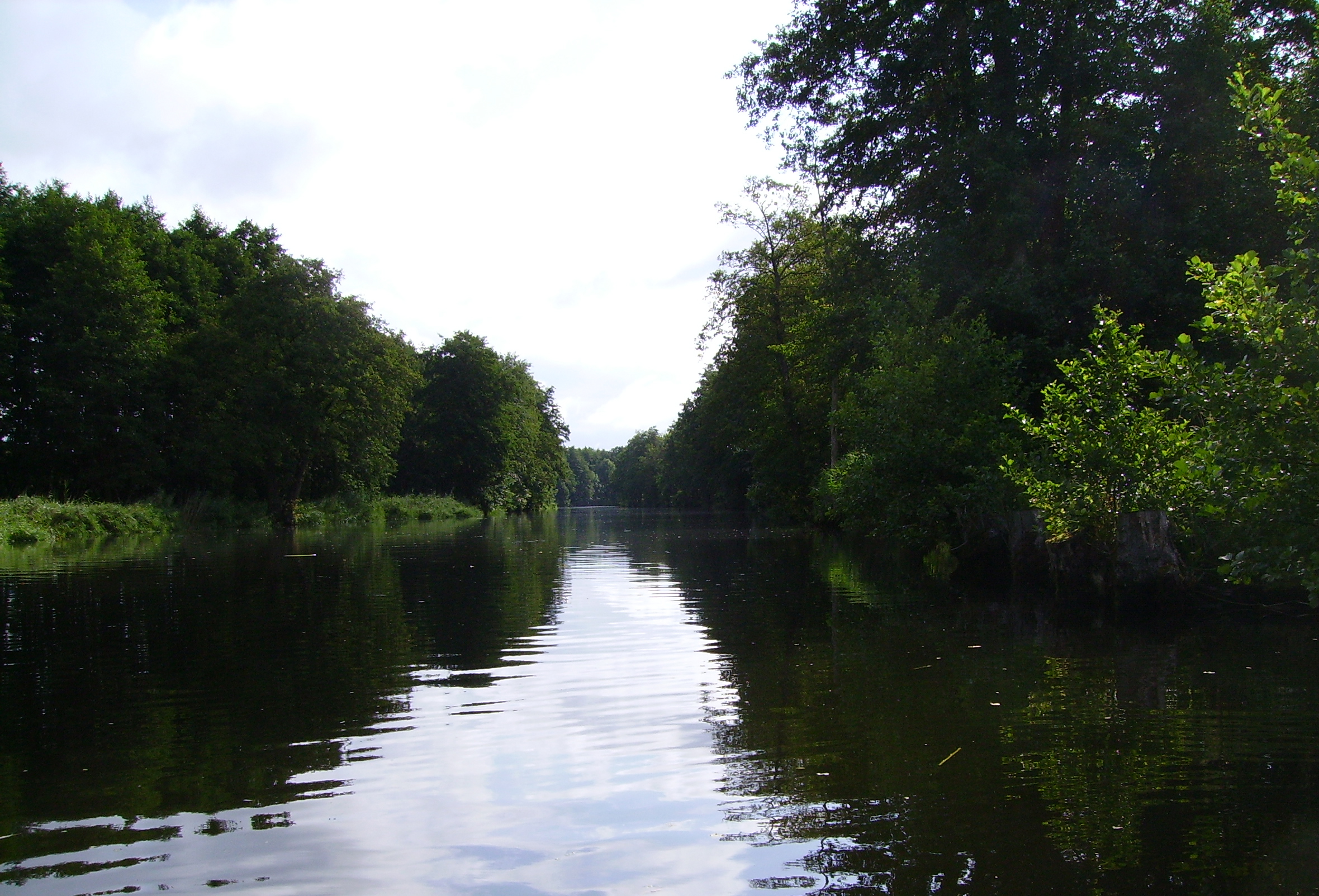
Peene river near Jarmen

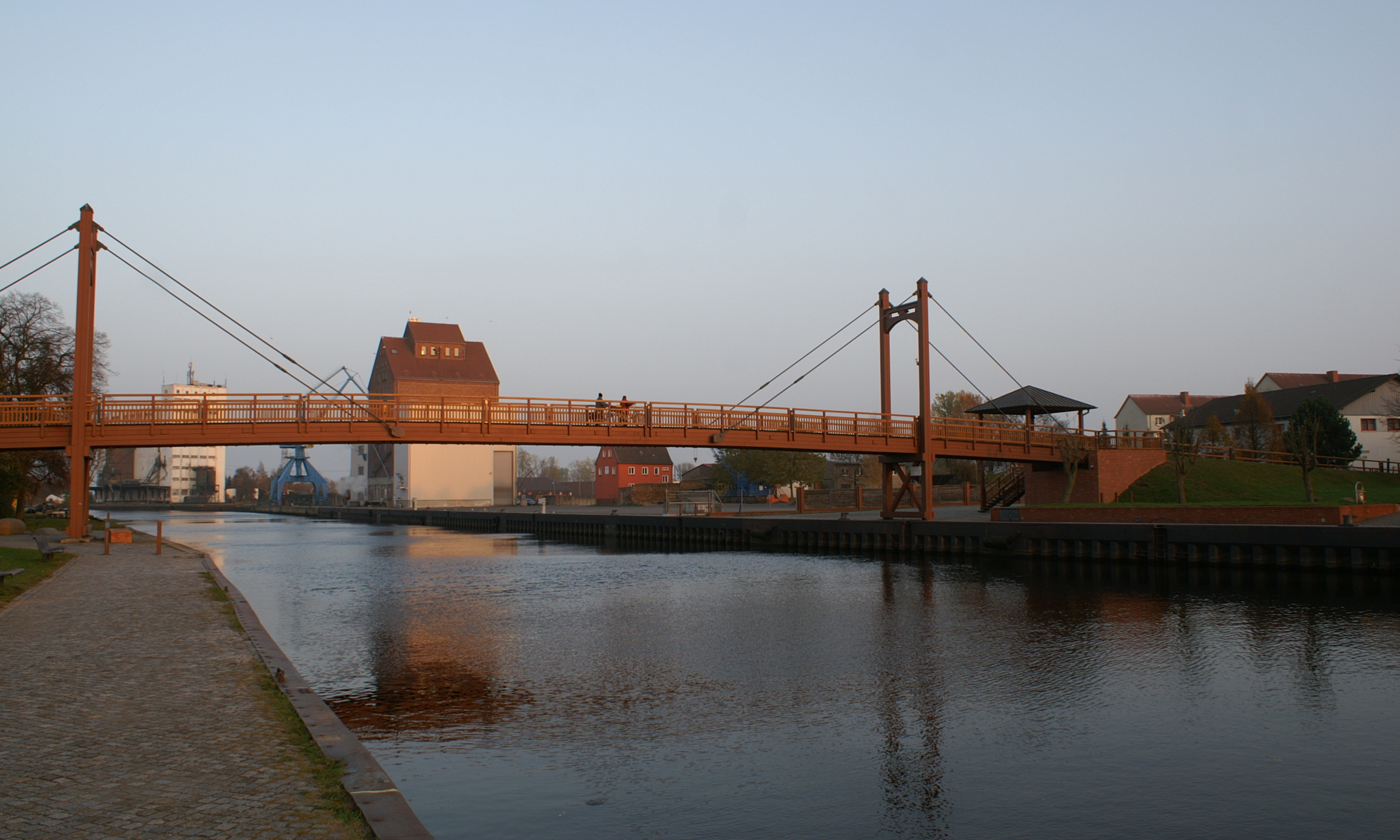
Peene river in Anklam

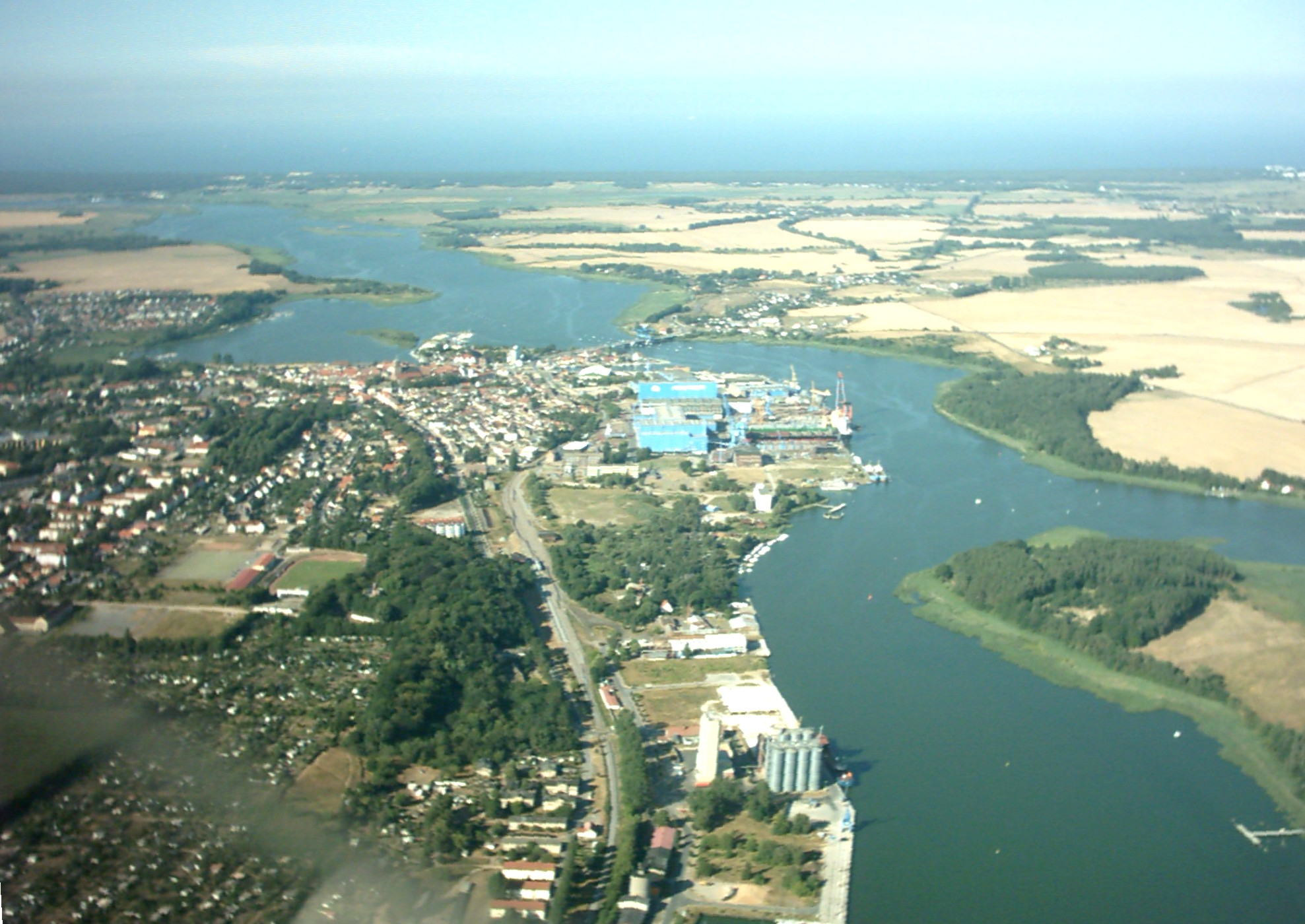
Peenestrom strait with Wolgast

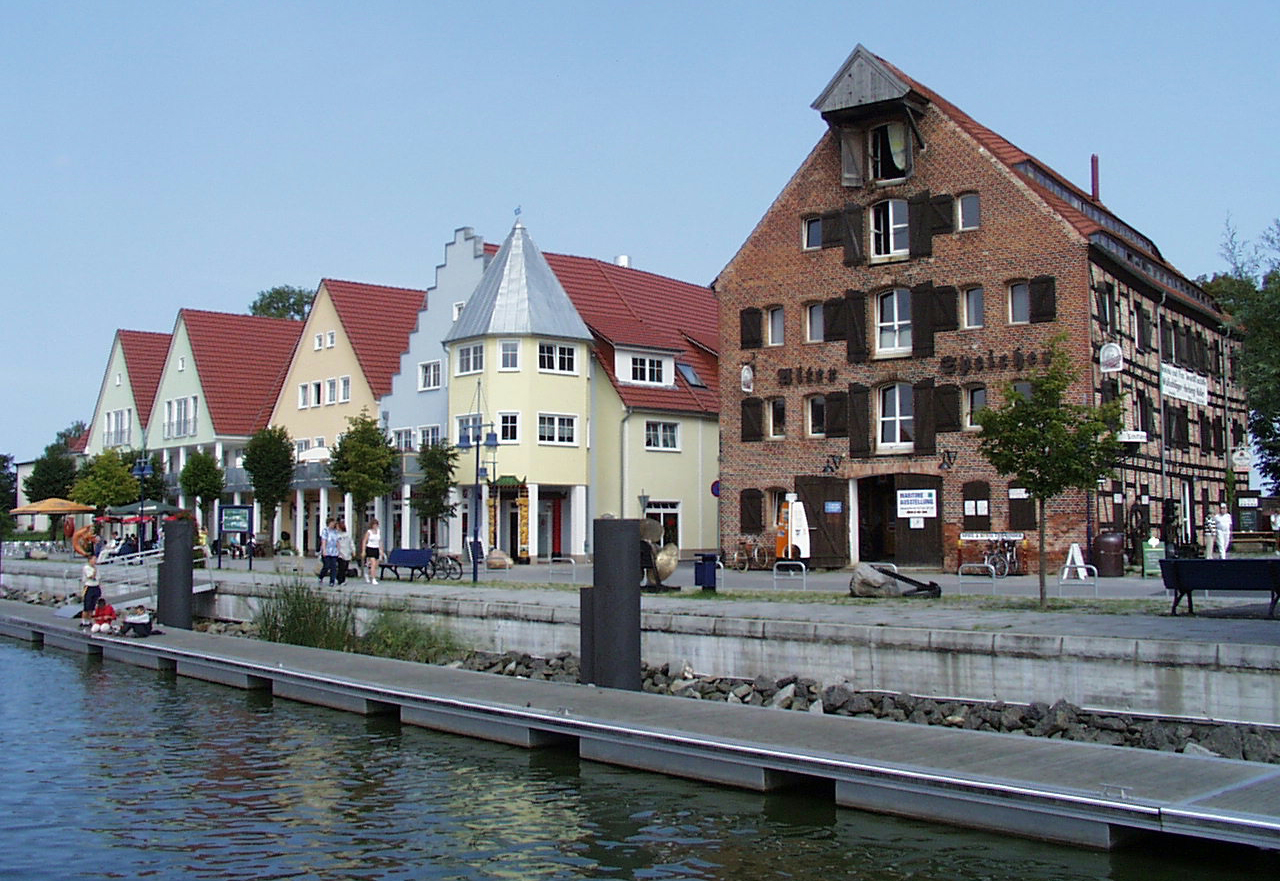
Peenestrom harbour in Wolgast

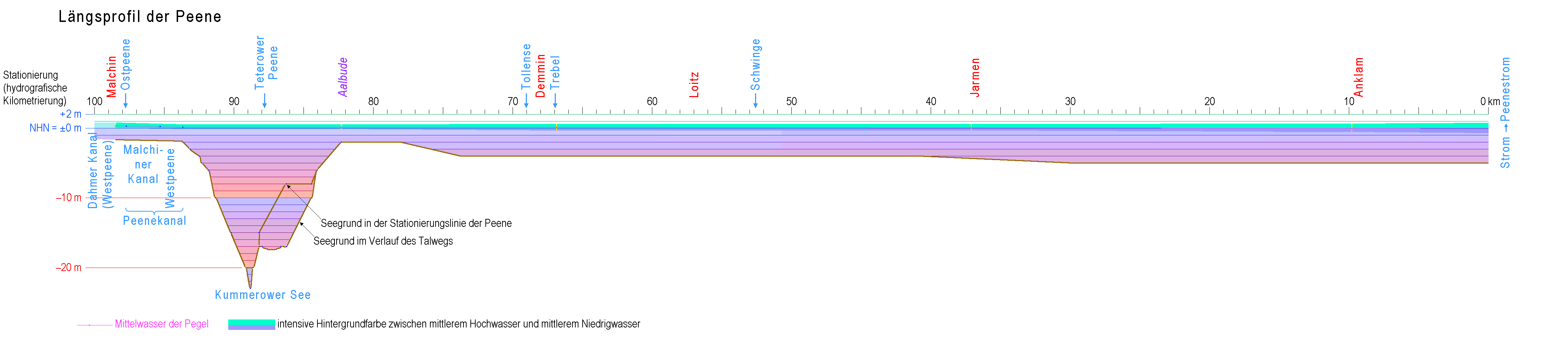
Longitudinal profile of Peene river from Malchin to the mouth into Peenestrom

== Hydrography ==
The Peene river itself has some properties of an inlet. From Kummerower See, inclusively, to the mouth, the ground of the water is five feet and more below sea level. The windkessel effect of the large surface of this lake allows reverse flows that with northern wind may last as long as a week. These reverse flows do not only occur in times of low discharge of its effluent, but also in times of an overflow of precipitation.

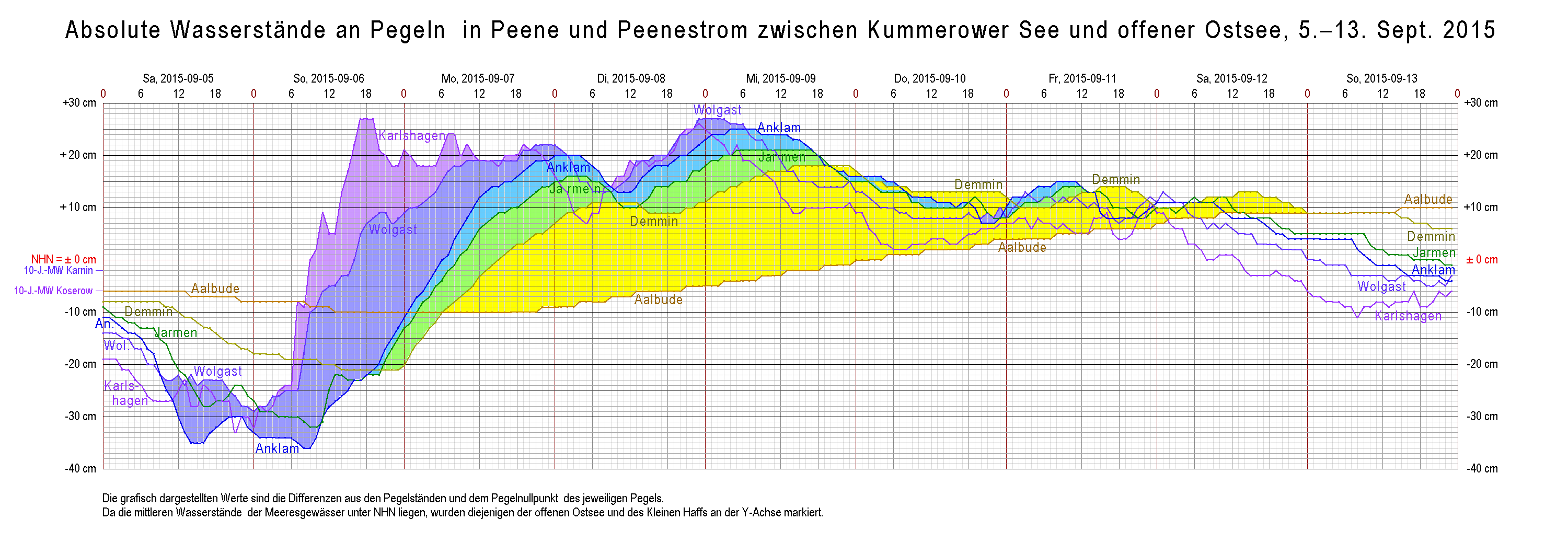
Water levels at a series of gauges on Peene river and Peenestrom strait during a week of revers flows. Karlshagen is on Peenestrom, near the open sea. Aalbude is near the exit of lake Kummerow. Coloured backgrounds represent stituations, when a more seaward water level was higher than a more inland water level

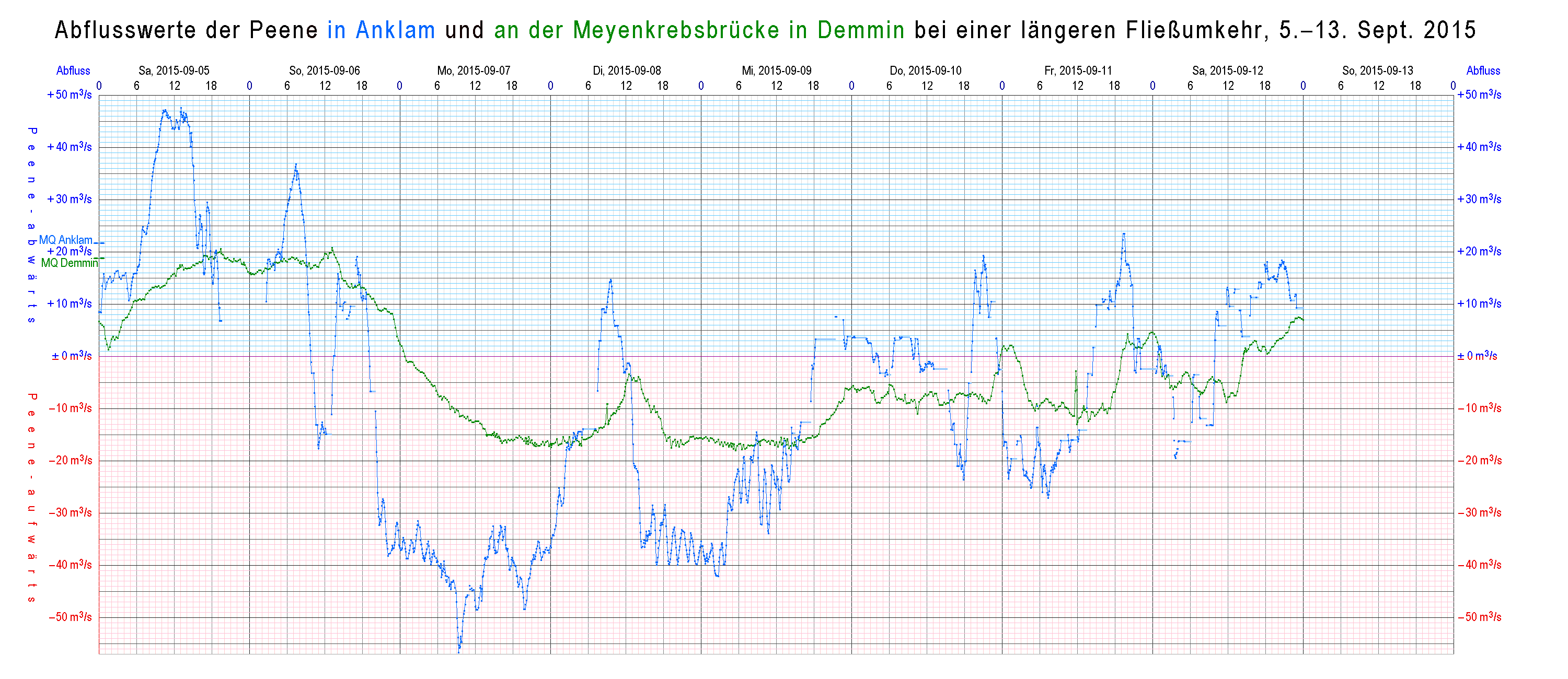
Flows in Anklam and in Demmin during the same week. The lower part of this graphic (with red grid )shows reverse flows.

== Ecology ==
The Peene Valley is one of the largest contiguous fen regions in central Europe. Thanks to its wilderness and intact nature, the river Peene and its valley is sometimes grandiloquently referred to as "the Amazon of the North".

Major towns at the Peene river are Malchin, Teterow, Demmin and Anklam.

Wolgast is on Peenestrom strait.
