= Zepelin =

- Municipality
- Location of Zepelin within Rostock district
- Interactive map of Zepelin
- Location within Germany Location within Mecklenburg-Vorpommern
- Coordinates: 53°49′59″N 12°03′00″E
- Country: Germany
- State: Mecklenburg-Vorpommern
- District: Rostock
- Municipal assoc.: Bützow-Land

Government
  - Mayor: Siegfried Warning

Area
  - Total: 22.36 km^{2} (8.63 sq mi)
- Elevation: 5 m (16 ft)

Population (2025-12-31)
  - Total: 460
  - Density: 21/km^{2} (53/sq mi)
- Time zone: UTC+01:00 (CET)
  - Summer (DST): UTC+02:00 (CEST)
- Postal codes: 18246
- Dialling codes: 038461
- Vehicle registration: LRO
- Website: www.amt-buetzow-land.de

Zepelin (German pronunciation: [ˌt͡sɛpɛˈlin]) is a municipality in the Rostock district, in Mecklenburg-Vorpommern, Germany. It is part of the Amt (administrative division) Bützow-Land.

== Geography ==
It is located in the rural region of northern Mecklenburg, on the road from Bützow to Schwaan and Güstrow. The Nebel River flows south of the village, reaching the Warnow at Bützow in the west.

== History ==
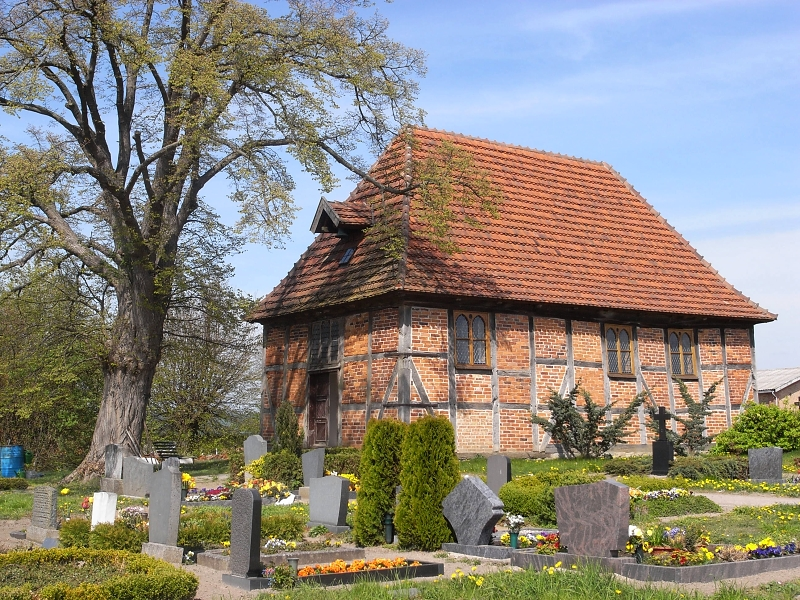
Zepelin Chapel

The locality around a village green was founded by German settlers in the 12th century, after the Obotrite area had been conquered by the Saxon duke Henry the Lion. Cepelin in the Duchy of Mecklenburg was first mentioned in a deed issued on 1 May 1246, it was called Zepelin from 1334. A chapel was built in the 14th century, the present-day timber-frame structure was re-built after the devastations in the Thirty Years' War.

One Heynricus (Henry) de Cepelin appeared in a document executed on 17 September 1286. Already in the late 15th century, the Zep(p)elin noble family, raised to Reichsgrafen in 1792, had moved their residence to nearby Thürkow and Appelhagen. In 1910 a memorial was erected in the honour of Count Ferdinand von Zeppelin (1838–1917) outside the village.
