= Malchin am Kummerower See =

- Amt
- Map of Mecklenburgische Seenplatte highlighting Malchin am Kummerower See
- Interactive map of Malchin am Kummerower See
- Location within Germany Location within Mecklenburg-Vorpommern
- Coordinates: 53°44′N 12°47′E
- Country: Germany
- State: Mecklenburg-Vorpommern
- District: Mecklenburgische Seenplatte
- Seat: Malchin
- Subdivisions: 6 municipalities

Area
  - Total: 307.74 km^{2} (118.82 sq mi)

Population (2025-12-31)
  - Total: 11,385
  - Density: 36.996/km^{2} (95.818/sq mi)
- Time zone: UTC+01:00 (CET)
  - Summer (DST): UTC+02:00 (CEST)
- Website: amt-malchin-am-kummerower-see.de

Malchin am Kummerower See is an Amt in the Mecklenburgische Seenplatte district, in Mecklenburg-Western Pomerania, Germany. It is just east of the Kummerower See. The seat of the Amt, that was formed in 2005, is in the town Malchin.

The Amt Malchin am Kummerower See consists of the following municipalities:

1. Basedow
2. Faulenrost
3. Gielow
4. Kummerow
5. Malchin
6. Neukalen
