= Little Switzerland (landscape) =

Landscape type

A little Switzerland or Schweiz is a landscape, often of wooded hills. This Romantic aesthetic term is not a geographic category, but was widely used in the 19th century to connote dramatic natural scenic features that would be of interest to tourists. Since it was ambiguous from the very beginning, it was flexibly used in travel writing to imply that a landscape had some features, though on a much smaller scale, that might remind a visitor of Switzerland.

== Rock outcrops ==
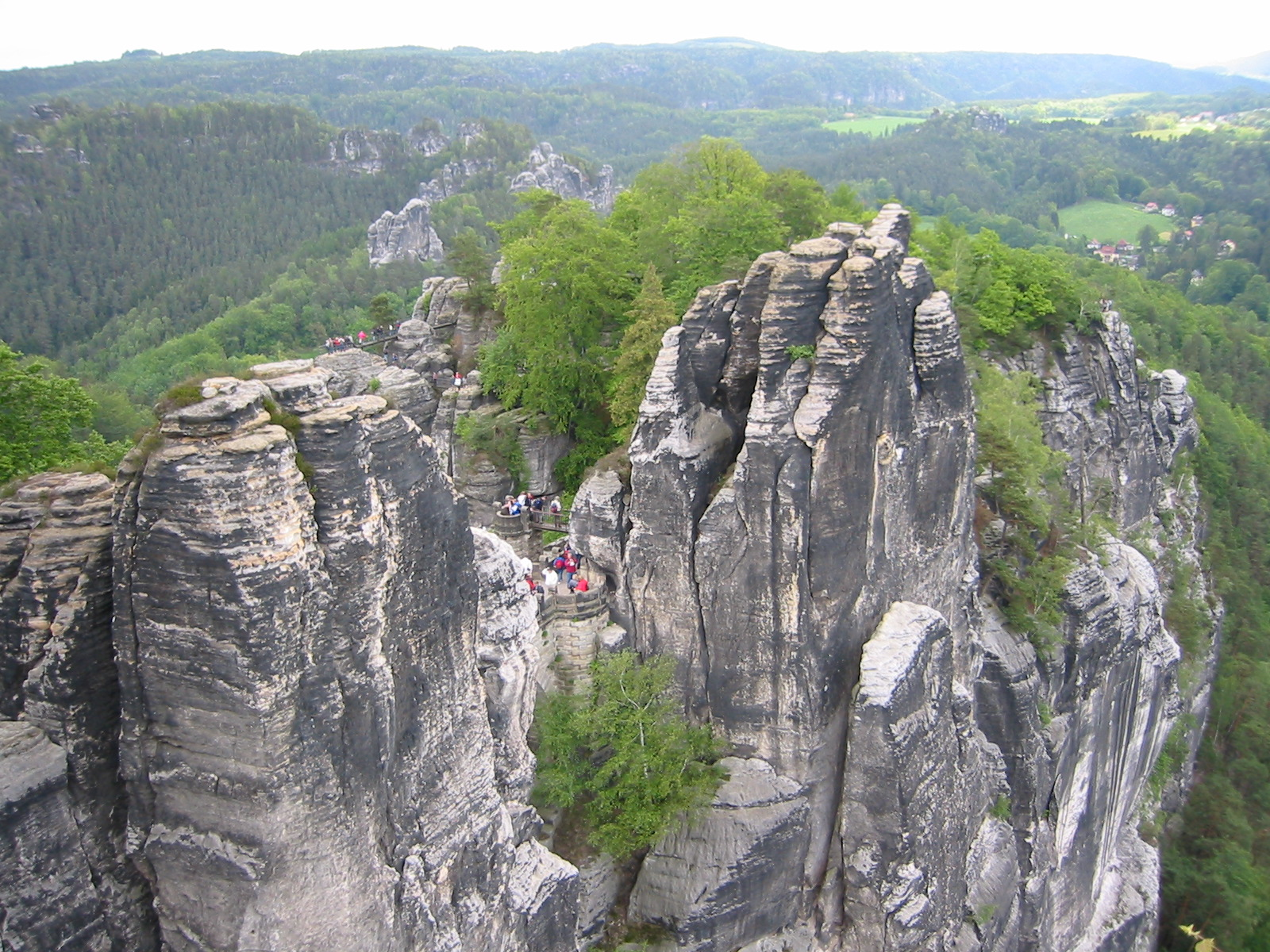
The Bastei, Saxon Switzerland

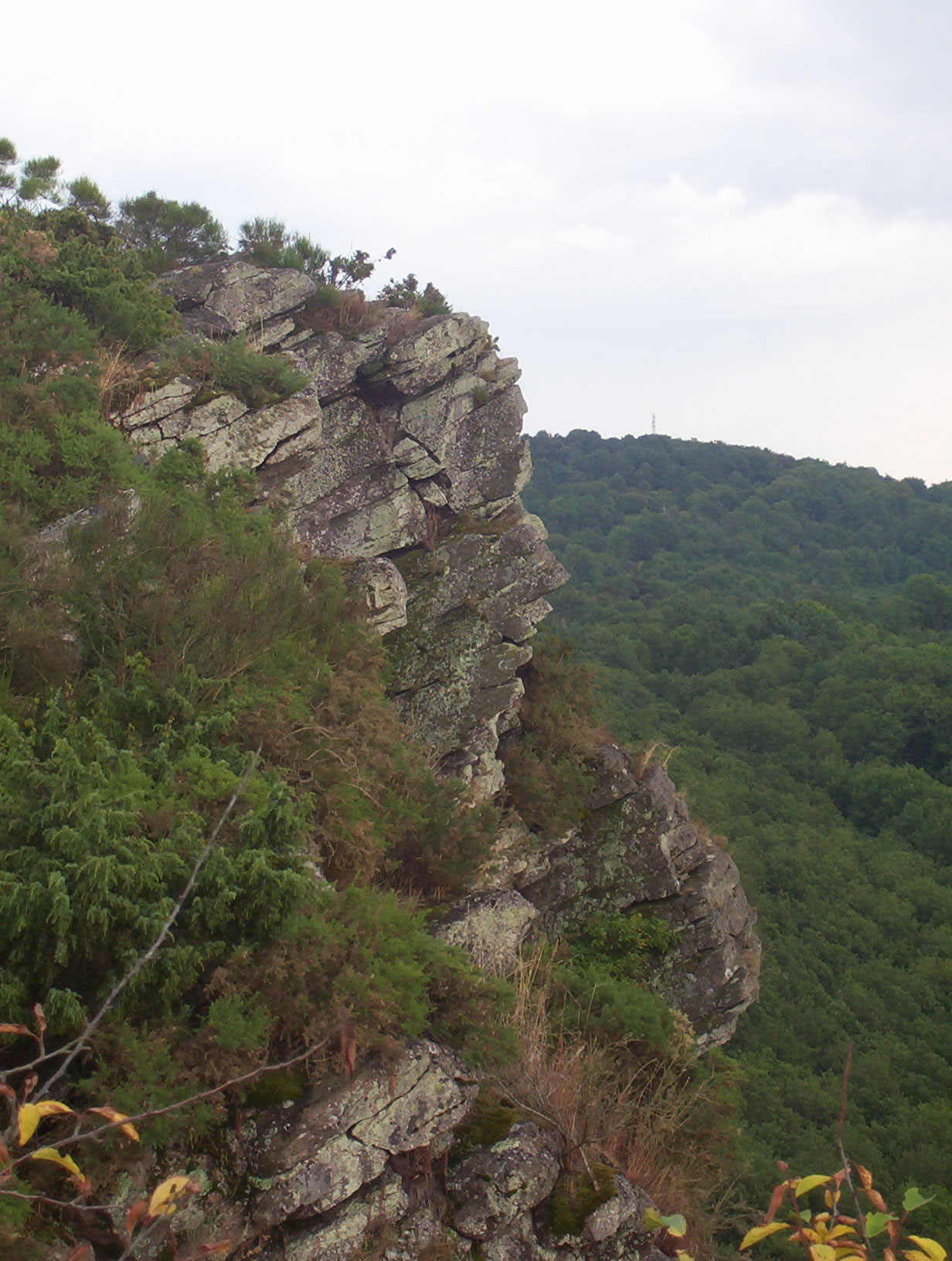
Rock of Oëtre, Norman Switzerland

The original generic term was applied to dozens of locations in Europe, the bulk of them German-speaking, as well as to other parts of the world, to direct attention to rock outcrops that stand out, usually amid steep forest. The original, 18th-century comparison was usually with the fissured crags of the Jura Mountains on the Franco-Swiss border which hardly rise higher than 1700 metres.

Histories of Saxon Switzerland (Sächsische Schweiz) in Saxony, Germany, assert that the landscape description schweiz arose there at the end of the 18th century. Schweiz is the German-language name of Switzerland. The term was used both alone and with the prefix "little", for example in the title of an 1820 German book-length poem, Die kleine Schweiz by Jakob Reiselsberger, which praised the rocky scenery of a part of Franconia in Germany known thereafter as the Franconian Switzerland (Fränkische Schweiz).

The term was already colloquial by this time in English: in 1823 a correspondent asserted in The Gentleman's Magazine that a steep area by the road outside Petersfield in southern England was a little Switzerland. The aesthetic term, to describe picturesque exposed rock and steepness rather than altitude, was also in common use in other European languages, including the French term Suisse. Rocks and wild landscapes were a favoured theme in Romantic painting.

The many English places praised in 19th-century promotional literature as "little Switzerland" include Church Stretton, Whitfield and the coastal area around the North Devon twin towns of Lynton and Lynmouth. Chalet-style buildings were sometimes erected to emphasize little Switzerland pretensions, for example at Matlock Bath, which (unusually for England) also features a cable car.

== Mountains ==
From the beginning, the term was often understood as a comparison to the snow-capped Alps rather than to the Jura. The following passage, describing Wales, appears in an 1831 English-language edition of Malte-Brun's Universal Geography, which had originally been written in French in 1803–07:

The great number of mountains which diversify its surface have gained it the name of Little Switzerland. It will be readily understood that it is not in the loftiness of their summits this resemblance can be traced with the country of the Alps, but in their steep, rough and perpendicular sides, the depth of their narrow valleys, the small but limpid lakes which occur at every step, the great number of rivers and streams which are now precipitated in cascades, and now roll their waters slowly through the meadows, the damp fogs which rise from the surface of these waters and often hang about the summits of the highest mountains, and the snow which frequently continues upon the heights till the end of spring: all of which give to these mountains, notwithstanding their inconsiderable height ... an appearance resembling those lordly eminences mounting up to the clouds and bearing on their heads eternal snows.

Describing the Atlantic island of St Helena in A New Voyage Round the World (1823–26), Otto von Kotzebue and Johann Friedrich Eschscholtz were translated into English as writing:

The environs of Sandy Bay would be a perfect little Switzerland, but that the glaciers are wanting to complete the resemblance. Scattered among the enormous masses of rock which lie confusedly heaped upon each other a frightful wilderness and most smilingly picturesque landscape alternately present their contrasted images.

In the United States, the raw White Mountains of New Hampshire, which were soon to be one of the definitive subjects of American Romantic painting, were termed a little Switzerland by travel writer Henry Tudor as early as 1832.

== Lakelands ==
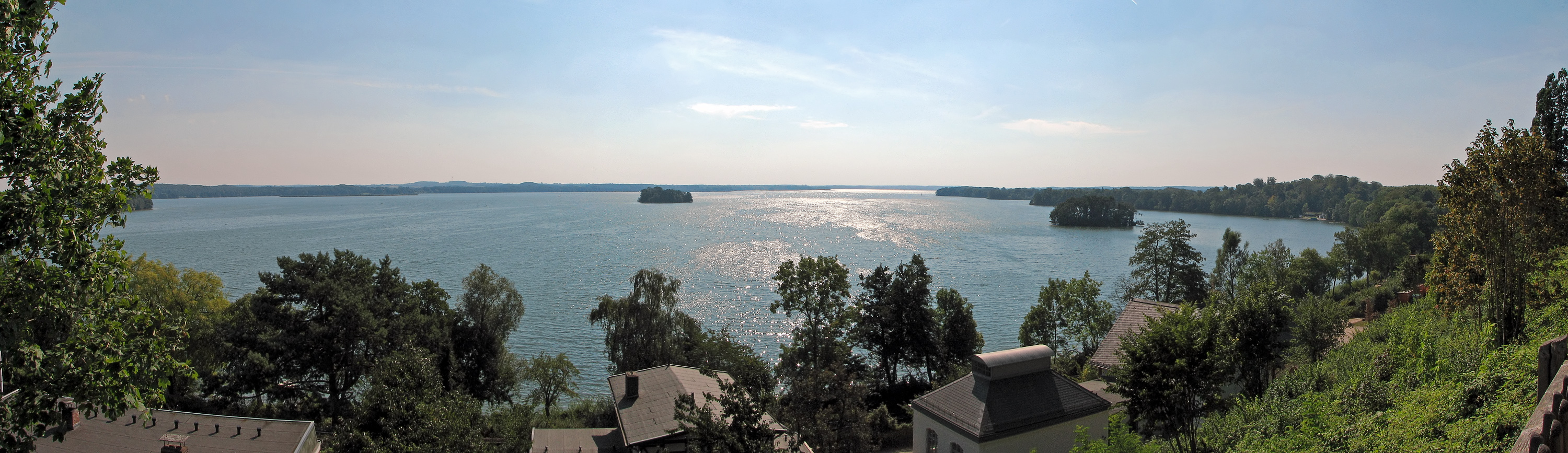
Lake Plön in Holstein Switzerland

In the later 19th century, authors and tourism promoters would praise picture-postcard summer scenery of woods and low hills reflected in blue lakes as a little Switzerland or schweiz. Whereas the earlier use had implied a landscape of dangers, this was a term for beauty.

This usage, reflected today in the official geographical terms for the Holstein Switzerland (Holsteinische Schweiz) and Mecklenburg Switzerland (Mecklenburgische Schweiz) in Germany, where there are neither mountains nor outcrops, is difficult to account for, but may refer to prestigious Swiss lakeside tourist destinations such as Zurich, Lucerne or Interlaken or to Lakes Geneva and Constance.

== Official names ==
The term has often appeared anachronistic since travel to Switzerland became affordable. By the 21st century, it was common for observers to express puzzlement that the "little Switzerland" label applied at all to regions such as the Suisse Normande, or to the Holstein Switzerland where the flat hilltops are no more than 150 metres above the lake surfaces.

In 1992, the Swiss Tourism Federation counted more than 190 places round the world that had at least for some period been named after Switzerland, either because of a fancied scenic resemblance, in jest or referring to a banking haven, political neutrality or habitation by Swiss emigrants. No fewer than 67 places in neighbouring Germany were said by the Federation to have adopted little Switzerland names.

While the byname has fallen out of fashion in some places, it persists as the official geographical name for several administrative regions and national parks including (with dates of legal designation):

- Bohemian Switzerland (České Švýcarsko, nature park, Czech Republic, legislation with effect 2000)
- Bremen Switzerland (undulating geest north of Bremen, that reaches 30 m; cf. the flat land on which Bremen is built.)
- Franconian Switzerland (tourism region, Germany, designated 1968)
- Hersbruck Switzerland (Hersbrucker Schweiz), low mountain region around Hersbruck, Germany
- Hohburg Switzerland (Hohburger Schweiz), alternative name for the Hohburg Hills near Leipzig
- Holstein Switzerland (nature park, Germany, formed by association 1986)
- Kashubian Switzerland (Szwajcaria Kaszubska, Poland)
- Kroppach Switzerland, rocky upland region near Kroppach in the Westerwald
- Marcher Switzerland (Märkische Schweiz, nature park, Germany, by decree 1990)
- Mecklenburg Switzerland (nature park, Germany, designated 1997)
- Rhenish-Hessian Switzerland (protected landscape and recreation area in Rhineland-Palatinate).
- Rostock Switzerland (rugged terminal moraine landscape near the Baltic coast in Mecklenburg-Vorpommern).
- Rüdigsdorf Switzerland (hill range and karst landscape in the southern Harz, most of which is a nature reserve)
- Ruppin Switzerland (a forested lakeland in Brandenburg)
- Saxon Switzerland (nature park, Germany, designated 1990; local government area, now in Saxon Switzerland-East Ore Mountains district)

Business promotion regions using the name without legally defined boundaries include:

- Suisse Normande (in the border region of the departments Calvados and Orne, France)
- Little Switzerland (Luxembourg) (dolomite formations near Echternach, Luxembourg)

Notable privately developed properties known by the name include:

- Little Switzerland, North Carolina (resort development on hilltop in North Carolina, US, from 1909)
- Little Switzerland (Wisconsin) (a ski resort from 1941 onwards)

In Israel, there is an area in Mount Carmel National Park popularly referred to as Little Switzerland (שוויצריה הקטנה). This name has been adopted by the Israel Nature and Parks Authority, which explains the name as having been given “due to the evergreen forest, the spectacular wild landscapes, and the pleasant weather on most days of the year.”

== Usage ==
In English, "Little Switzerland" is usually said without any definite article or additional adjective, but often with a genitive modifier if there are several little Switzerlands within one nation, e.g. North Carolina's Little Switzerland. In European languages where Switzerland proper takes a definite article, little Switzerlands do likewise. Their English names may echo the vernacular, being capitalized and modified to the English alphabet, sometimes taking an English definite article, e.g. the Saechsische Schweiz (die Sächsische Schweiz) and the Suisse Normande (la Suisse normande). English forms are also widespread, e.g. Holstein Switzerland (Dickinson, 1964), Swiss Franconia (Michelin, 1993), Franconian Switzerland (Fodor, 1962, and Bolt, 2005.)

== See also ==
- Geography of Switzerland
