= Kummerow =

- Municipality
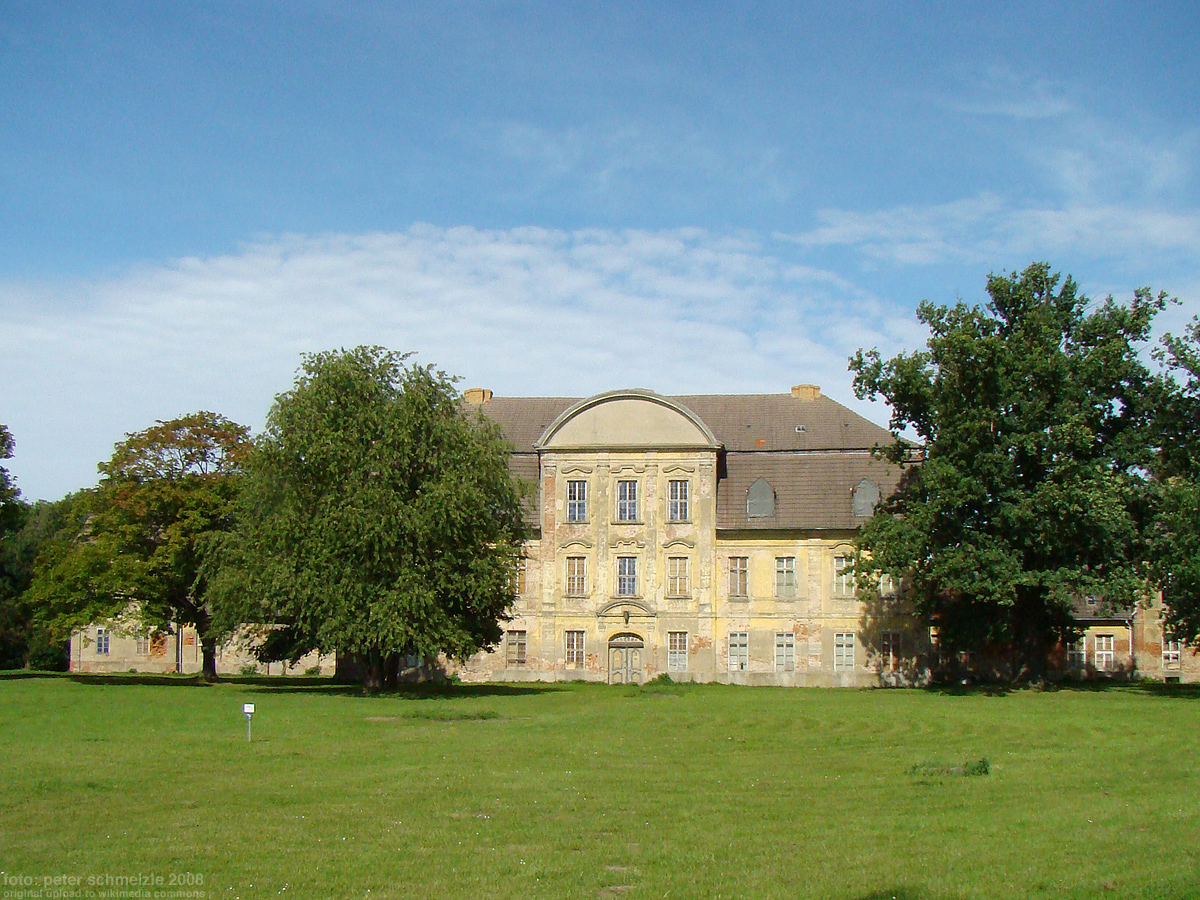
- Kummerow am See - Baroque castle

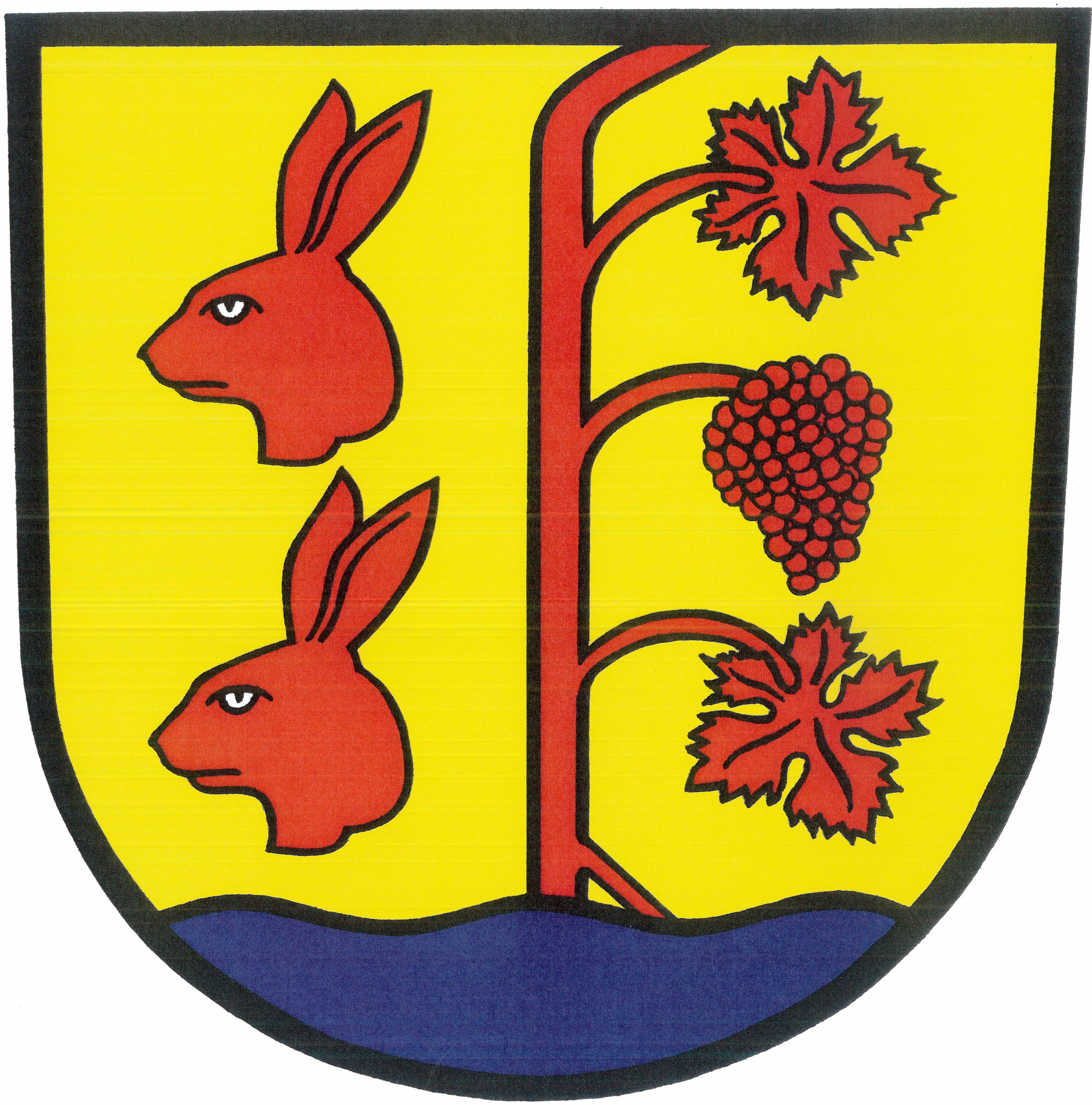
- Coat of arms

- Location of Kummerow within Mecklenburgische Seenplatte district
- Interactive map of Kummerow
- Location within Germany Location within Mecklenburg-Vorpommern
- Coordinates: 53°46′N 12°50′E
- Country: Germany
- State: Mecklenburg-Vorpommern
- District: Mecklenburgische Seenplatte
- Municipal assoc.: Malchin am Kummerower See
- Subdivisions: 4

Government
  - Mayor: Bernd Moritz

Area
  - Total: 55.14 km^{2} (21.29 sq mi)
- Elevation: 32 m (105 ft)

Population (2025-12-31)
  - Total: 549
  - Density: 9.96/km^{2} (25.8/sq mi)
- Time zone: UTC+01:00 (CET)
  - Summer (DST): UTC+02:00 (CEST)
- Postal codes: 17139
- Dialling codes: 039952
- Vehicle registration: DM
- Website: www.kummerow.de

Kummerow is a municipality in the Mecklenburgische Seenplatte district, in Mecklenburg-Vorpommern, Germany. It is often called Kummerow am See to avoid confusion with Kummerow near Stralsund. The timber framed village church and the baroque castle at the lake (Kummerower See) are notable landmarks.
