= Gielow =

- Municipality
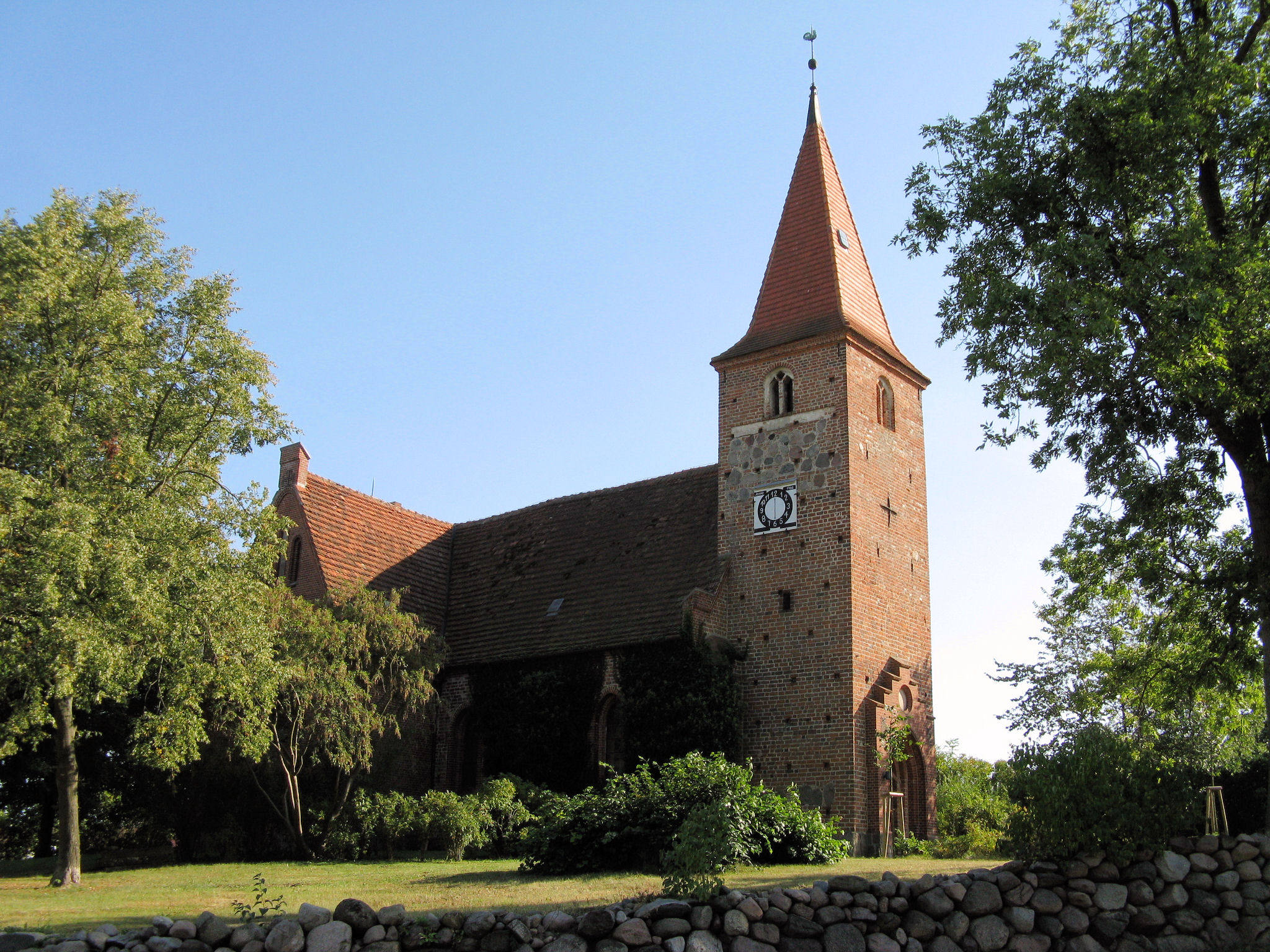
- Medieval church in Gielow

- Coat of arms

- Location of Gielow within Mecklenburgische Seenplatte district
- Interactive map of Gielow
- Location within Germany Location within Mecklenburg-Vorpommern
- Coordinates: 53°42′N 12°45′E
- Country: Germany
- State: Mecklenburg-Vorpommern
- District: Mecklenburgische Seenplatte
- Municipal assoc.: Malchin am Kummerower See
- Subdivisions: 5

Government
  - Mayor: Udo Kahlert

Area
  - Total: 23.47 km^{2} (9.06 sq mi)
- Elevation: 28 m (92 ft)

Population (2025-12-31)
  - Total: 1,100
  - Density: 47/km^{2} (120/sq mi)
- Time zone: UTC+01:00 (CET)
  - Summer (DST): UTC+02:00 (CEST)
- Postal codes: 17139
- Dialling codes: 039957
- Vehicle registration: DM
- Website: www.malchin.de

Gielow is a municipality in the Mecklenburgische Seenplatte district, in Mecklenburg-Vorpommern, Germany.
