= Duckow =

- Ortsteil of Malchin
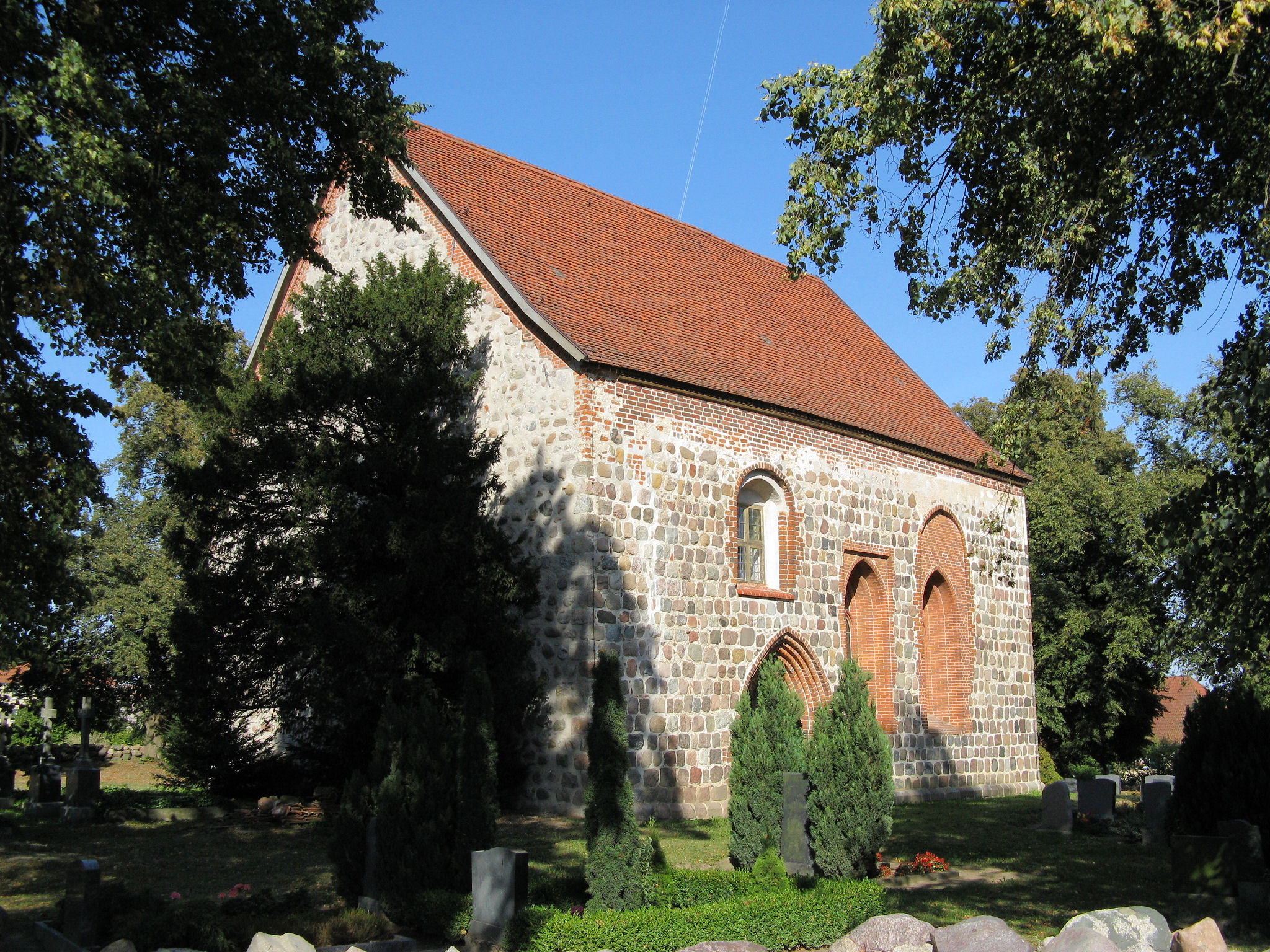
- Interactive map of Duckow
- Location within Germany Location within Mecklenburg-Vorpommern
- Coordinates: 53°42′N 12°48′E
- Country: Germany
- State: Mecklenburg-Vorpommern
- District: Mecklenburgische Seenplatte
- Town: Malchin

Area
  - Total: 14.21 km^{2} (5.49 sq mi)
- Elevation: 57 m (187 ft)

Population (2017-12-31)
  - Total: 227
  - Density: 16.0/km^{2} (41.4/sq mi)
- Time zone: UTC+01:00 (CET)
  - Summer (DST): UTC+02:00 (CEST)
- Postal codes: 17134
- Dialling codes: 039957
- Vehicle registration: DM

Duckow (German pronunciation: [ˈdʊkoː]) is a village and a former municipality in the Mecklenburgische Seenplatte district, in Mecklenburg-Vorpommern, Germany. Since January 2019, it is part of the municipality Malchin.
