= Rostock Switzerland =

Terminal moraine landscape within the Kösterbeck Nature Reserve, Switzerland

Coordinates: 54°03′25″N 12°13′35″E

Rostock Switzerland (German: Rostocker Schweiz) is a terminal moraine landscape and part of the Kösterbeck Nature Reserve. It lies southeast of the German city of Rostock in the district of the same name. The majority of it is in the municipality of Roggentin. For a region so near the coast, it is very hilly, hence the name Rostock Switzerland. The Kösterbeck is a small river, that runs through a deep incision that emphasises the height differences. The valley of the Kösterbeck lies two metres above sea level, its highest elevation is 66 metres. It has changed its name several times: before 1900 it was known as the Bäukenbarg (i.e. Buchenberg or "beech hill"), during the German Reich it was the Kaiserberg ("Emperor Hill") and in GDR times, Freundschaftshöhe ("Friendship Heights").

== Settlement ==
This area was already densely populated by Slavic times (800–1000). Witnesses to that are the well preserved Slavic castle ramparts near Fresendorf (on the Schlossberg or "castle hill") as well as a neighbouring tumulus. Since the late Middle Ages this region has been largely unforested and was used for centuries as pasture land. As a result of constant grazing the landscape was kept open and has been colonised predominantly by drought-loving, grazing-resistant plants that need lots of warmth and light and by animals that are well-adapted to the environment.

Today the villages of Unterkösterbeck (in the Kösterbeck valley), Oberkösterbeck and Fresendorf in the municipality of Roggentin and Beselin in the municipality of Dummerstorf lie on the edge of the area.

== Tourism ==
Previously there was an observation tower here, from where there were views of Rostock and the surrounding area and, on clear days, even as far as Warnemünde.

In Rostock Switzerland there was once the northernmost ski lift in the East Germany. Remains of the ski lift can still be found between Unterkösterbeck and Beselin.

== See also ==
- Regions whose name incorporates "Switzerland"
