= Lelkendorf =

- Municipality
- Location of Lelkendorf within Rostock district
- Interactive map of Lelkendorf
- Location within Germany Location within Mecklenburg-Vorpommern
- Coordinates: 53°51′00″N 12°43′59″E
- Country: Germany
- State: Mecklenburg-Vorpommern
- District: Rostock
- Municipal assoc.: Mecklenburgische Schweiz

Government
  - Mayor: Eggo Habelt

Area
  - Total: 29.76 km^{2} (11.49 sq mi)
- Elevation: 20 m (66 ft)

Population (2025-12-31)
  - Total: 425
  - Density: 14.3/km^{2} (37.0/sq mi)
- Time zone: UTC+01:00 (CET)
  - Summer (DST): UTC+02:00 (CEST)
- Postal codes: 17168
- Dialling codes: 039956
- Vehicle registration: LRO
- Website: www.amt-mecklenburgische-schweiz.de

Lelkendorf is a municipality in the Rostock district, in Mecklenburg-Vorpommern, Germany.
