= Dalkendorf =

- Municipality
- Location of Dalkendorf within Rostock district
- Interactive map of Dalkendorf
- Location within Germany Location within Mecklenburg-Vorpommern
- Coordinates: 53°49′00″N 12°30′00″E
- Country: Germany
- State: Mecklenburg-Vorpommern
- District: Rostock
- Municipal assoc.: Mecklenburgische Schweiz

Government
  - Mayor: Hans Müller

Area
  - Total: 15.30 km^{2} (5.91 sq mi)
- Elevation: 54 m (177 ft)

Population (2025-12-31)
  - Total: 267
  - Density: 17.5/km^{2} (45.2/sq mi)
- Time zone: UTC+01:00 (CET)
  - Summer (DST): UTC+02:00 (CEST)
- Postal codes: 17166
- Dialling codes: 039978
- Vehicle registration: LRO
- Website: www.amt-mecklenburgische-schweiz.de

Dalkendorf is a municipality in the Rostock district, in Mecklenburg-Vorpommern, Germany.
