= Kösterbeck (river) =

River in Germany

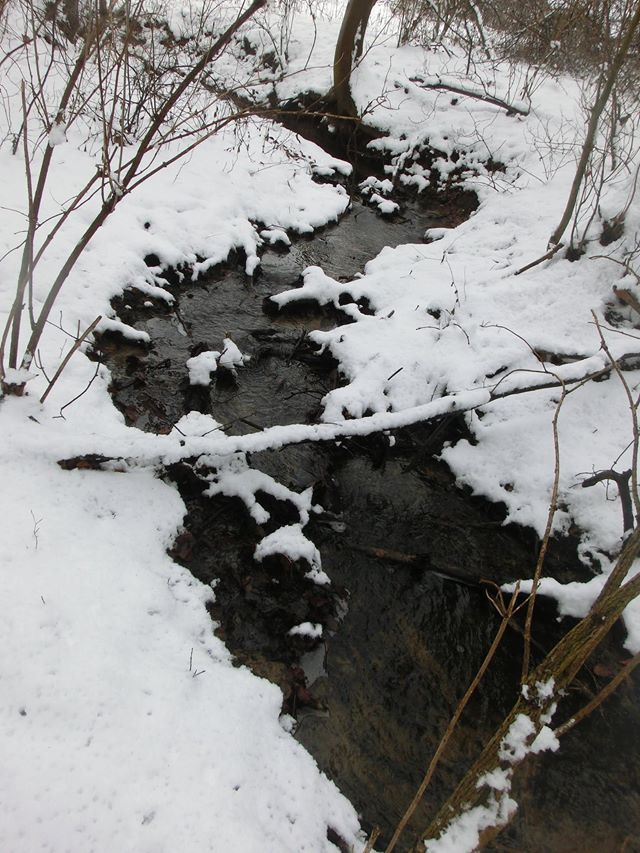

Location
- Country: Germany
- State: Mecklenburg-Vorpommern
- Reference no.: DE: 96494

Physical characteristics
- Source
  - location: Teufelsmoor near Sanitz
  - elevation: 33 m (108 ft)
- Mouth
  - location: near Kessin into the Warnow
  - coordinates: 54°03′21″N 12°10′36″E
  - elevation: 0.2 m above HN
- Length: 15 km (9.3 mi)

Basin features
- Progression: Warnow→ Baltic Sea
- River system: Coastal region
- Navigable: no

The Kösterbeck is a small river near Rostock in the German state of Mecklenburg-Vorpommern. It is a tributary of the Warnow. The river runs through the nature reserve of the same name in the parish of Roggentin in a part of Rostock Switzerland. This hilly landscape was formed as a terminal moraine in the ice age.

The Kösterbeck is fed from several small runlets, that drain the Teufelsmoor ("Devil's Moor") near Sanitz, and by the Moehlenbäk ca. 1.5 km south of Sanitz. As a result of agricultural use, the Kösterbeck has had its natural course changed. The Kösterbeck is crossed at Kessin by the A 19 motorway and empties, after 1.3 kilometres, into the Warnow.

== See also ==
- List of rivers of Mecklenburg-Vorpommern
