= Alt Sührkow =

- Municipality
- Location of Alt Sührkow within Rostock district
- Interactive map of Alt Sührkow
- Location within Germany Location within Mecklenburg-Vorpommern
- Coordinates: 53°47′47″N 12°39′00″E
- Country: Germany
- State: Mecklenburg-Vorpommern
- District: Rostock
- Municipal assoc.: Mecklenburgische Schweiz

Government
  - Mayor: Rainer Mucke

Area
  - Total: 25.32 km^{2} (9.78 sq mi)
- Elevation: 10 m (33 ft)

Population (2025-12-31)
  - Total: 384
  - Density: 15.2/km^{2} (39.3/sq mi)
- Time zone: UTC+01:00 (CET)
  - Summer (DST): UTC+02:00 (CEST)
- Postal codes: 17166
- Dialling codes: 03996
- Vehicle registration: LRO
- Website: www.amt-mecklenburgische-schweiz.de

Alt Sührkow is a municipality in the Rostock district, in Mecklenburg-Vorpommern, Germany.
