= Groß Roge =

- Municipality
- Location of Groß Roge within Rostock district
- Interactive map of Groß Roge
- Location within Germany Location within Mecklenburg-Vorpommern
- Coordinates: 53°46′59″N 12°30′00″E
- Country: Germany
- State: Mecklenburg-Vorpommern
- District: Rostock
- Municipal assoc.: Mecklenburgische Schweiz

Government
  - Mayor: Herbert Hoeft

Area
  - Total: 24.34 km^{2} (9.40 sq mi)
- Elevation: 42 m (138 ft)

Population (2025-12-31)
  - Total: 582
  - Density: 23.9/km^{2} (61.9/sq mi)
- Time zone: UTC+01:00 (CET)
  - Summer (DST): UTC+02:00 (CEST)
- Postal codes: 17166
- Dialling codes: 039978
- Vehicle registration: LRO
- Website: www.amt-mecklenburgische-schweiz.de

Groß Roge is a municipality in the Rostock district, in Mecklenburg-Vorpommern, Germany.
