= Kösterbeck (nature reserve) =

Nature reserve in Mecklenburg-Vorpommern, Germany

Coordinates: 54°03′16″N 12°13′54″E

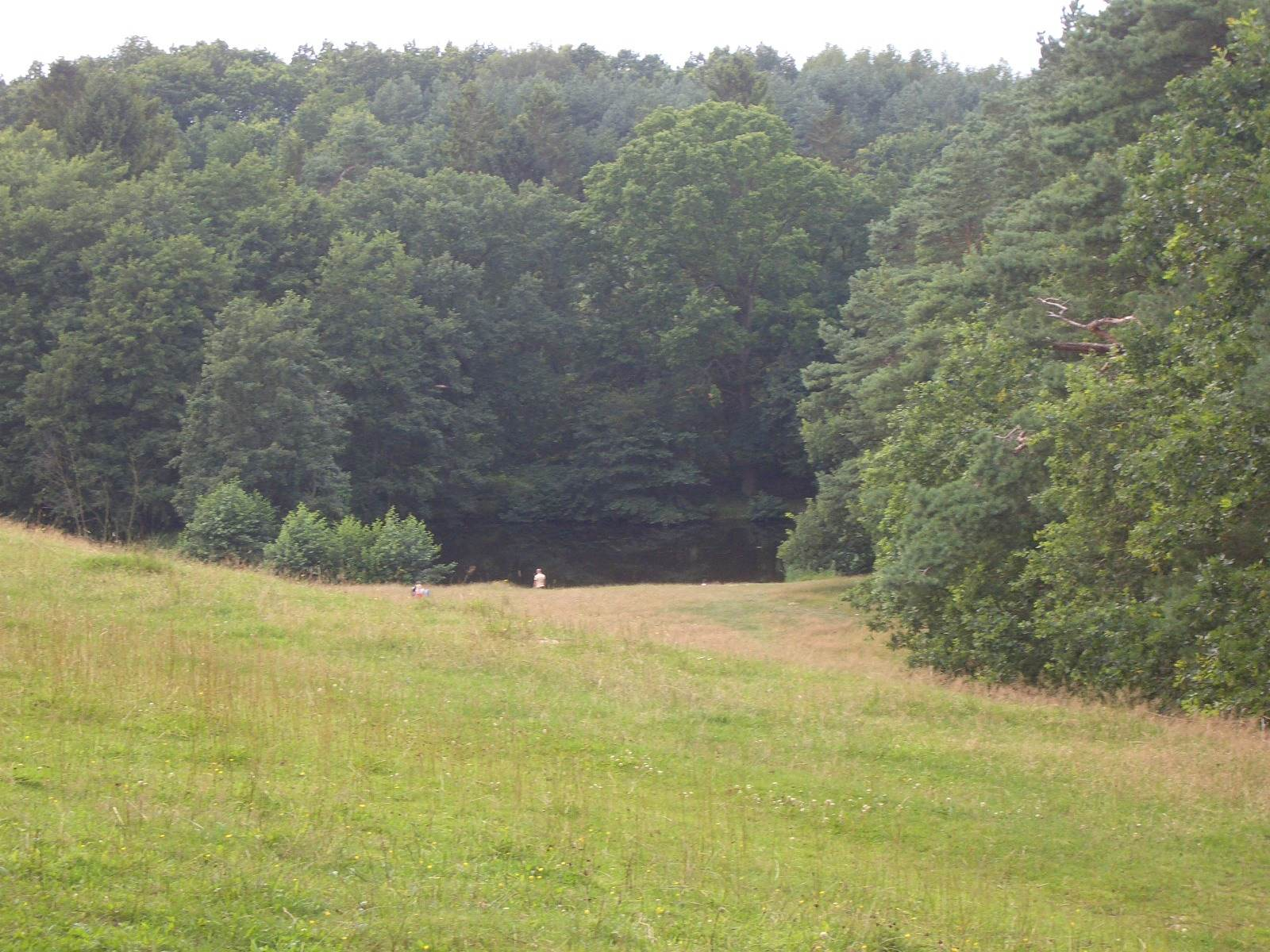
Wood, pasture and lakeland

Kösterbeck (German: Naturschutzgebiet Kösterbeck) is a nature reserve in the German state of Mecklenburg-Vorpommern, which was established in 1986. Its territory was expanded in 1990 and reduced on 13 June 1995. It derives its name from a stream flowing from east to west through the area, also called the Kösterbeck, a tributary of the Warnow.

Its conservation aim is to preserve and develop the very undulating and varied moraine landscape of Rostock Switzerland with a stream system and adjoining lean pasture, spring bogs and wet meadows.

== Literature ==
- Umweltministerium Mecklenburg-Vorpommern, ed. (2003), "Kösterbeck 226", Die Naturschutzgebiete in Mecklenburg-Vorpommern (in German), Schwerin: Demmler-Verlag, pp. 282f, ISBN 3-910150-52-7
