= Basedow, Mecklenburg-Vorpommern =

Basedow
- Municipality
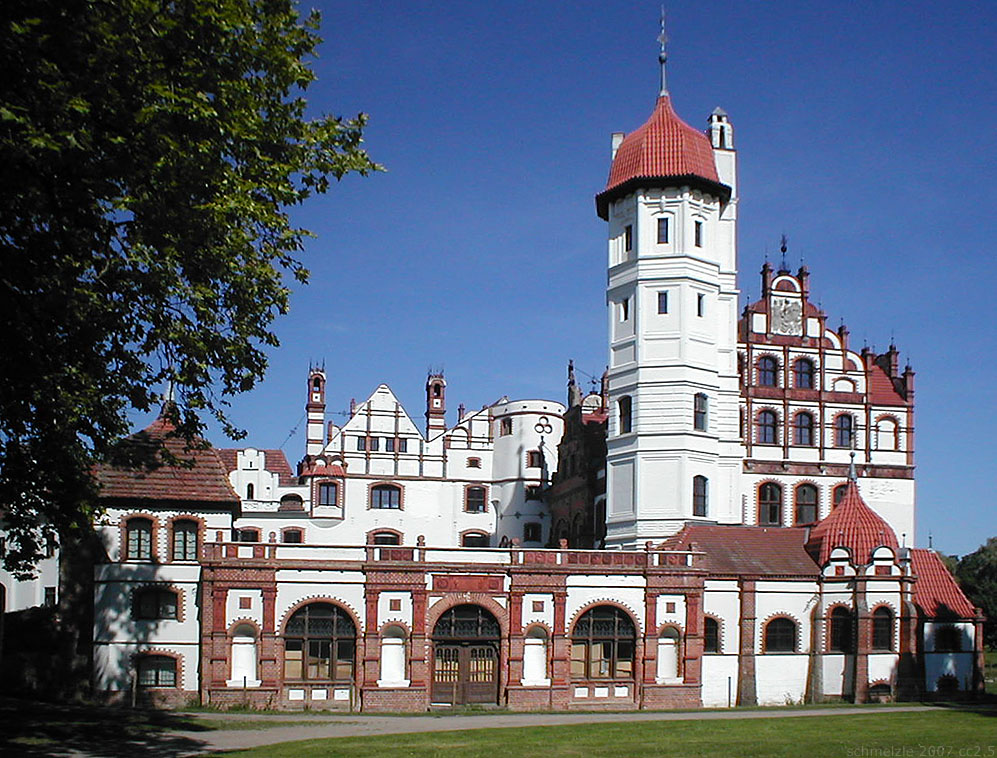
- Schloss Basedow (Basedow Manor)

- Coat of arms

- Location of Basedow within Mecklenburgische Seenplatte district
- Interactive map of Basedow
- Location within Germany Location within Mecklenburg-Vorpommern
- Coordinates: 53°42′N 12°40′E
- Country: Germany
- State: Mecklenburg-Vorpommern
- District: Mecklenburgische Seenplatte
- Municipal assoc.: Malchin am Kummerower See
- Subdivisions: 4

Government
  - Mayor: Kurt Reinholz

Area
  - Total: 35.54 km^{2} (13.72 sq mi)
- Elevation: 24 m (79 ft)

Population (2025-12-31)
  - Total: 673
  - Density: 18.9/km^{2} (49.0/sq mi)
- Time zone: UTC+01:00 (CET)
  - Summer (DST): UTC+02:00 (CEST)
- Postal codes: 17139
- Dialling codes: 039957
- Vehicle registration: DM
- Website: www.malchin.de

Basedow (German pronunciation: [ˈbaːzədoː]) is a municipality in the Mecklenburgische Seenplatte district, in Mecklenburg-Vorpommern, Germany.
