= Schorssow =

- Municipality
- Location of Schorssow within Rostock district
- Interactive map of Schorssow
- Location within Germany Location within Mecklenburg-Vorpommern
- Coordinates: 53°40′59″N 12°34′29″E
- Country: Germany
- State: Mecklenburg-Vorpommern
- District: Rostock
- Municipal assoc.: Mecklenburgische Schweiz

Government
  - Mayor: Margret Taufmann

Area
  - Total: 30.89 km^{2} (11.93 sq mi)
- Elevation: 8 m (26 ft)

Population (2025-12-31)
  - Total: 417
  - Density: 13.5/km^{2} (35.0/sq mi)
- Time zone: UTC+01:00 (CET)
  - Summer (DST): UTC+02:00 (CEST)
- Postal codes: 17166
- Dialling codes: 039933
- Vehicle registration: LRO
- Website: www.amt-mecklenburgische-schweiz.de

Schorssow is a municipality in the Rostock district, in Mecklenburg-Vorpommern, Germany.
