= Dahmen =

- Municipality
- Coat of arms

- Location of Dahmen within Rostock district
- Interactive map of Dahmen
- Location within Germany Location within Mecklenburg-Vorpommern
- Coordinates: 53°39′N 12°35′E
- Country: Germany
- State: Mecklenburg-Vorpommern
- District: Rostock
- Municipal assoc.: Mecklenburgische Schweiz

Government
  - Mayor: Gerald Klick

Area
  - Total: 36.36 km^{2} (14.04 sq mi)
- Elevation: 8 m (26 ft)

Population (2025-12-31)
  - Total: 422
  - Density: 11.6/km^{2} (30.1/sq mi)
- Time zone: UTC+01:00 (CET)
  - Summer (DST): UTC+02:00 (CEST)
- Postal codes: 17166
- Dialling codes: 039933
- Vehicle registration: LRO
- Website: www.amt-mecklenburgische-schweiz.de

Dahmen is a municipality in the Rostock district, in Mecklenburg-Vorpommern, Germany.

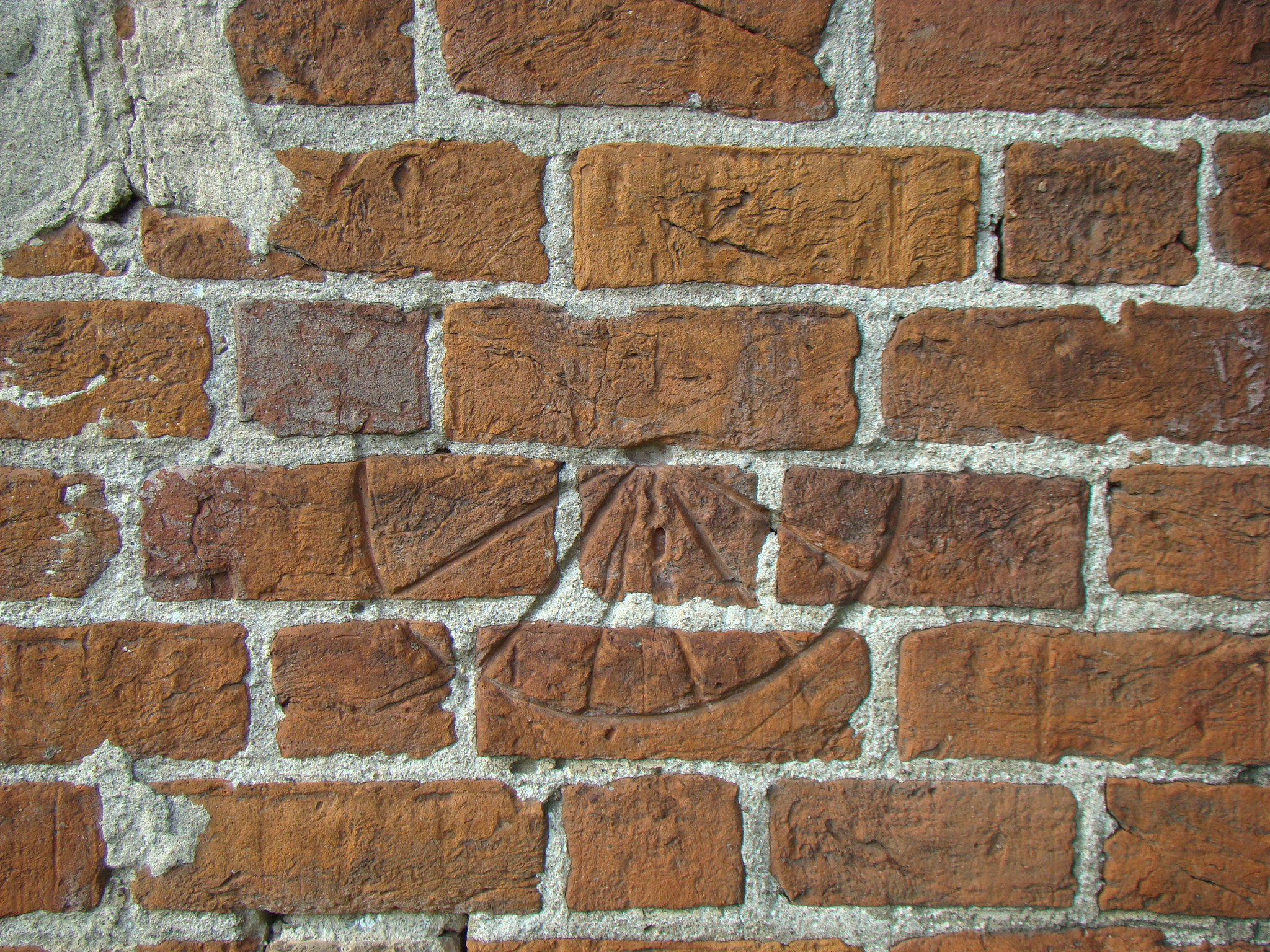
The tide dial on the town's medieval gothic church
