= Mecklenburgische Schweiz =

Scenic region in Mecklenburg, Germany

- Amt
- Map of Rostock highlighting Mecklenburgische Schweiz
- Interactive map of Mecklenburgische Schweiz
- Location within Germany Location within Mecklenburg-Vorpommern
- Coordinates: 53°46′N 12°34′E
- Country: Germany
- State: Mecklenburg-Vorpommern
- District: Rostock
- Seat: Teterow
- Subdivisions: 15 municipalities

Area
  - Total: 384.91 km^{2} (148.61 sq mi)

Population (2025-12-31)
  - Total: 7,922
  - Density: 20.58/km^{2} (53.31/sq mi)
- Time zone: UTC+01:00 (CET)
  - Summer (DST): UTC+02:00 (CEST)
- Website: www.amt-mecklenburgische-schweiz.de

Mecklenburgische Schweiz is an Amt in the district of Rostock, in Mecklenburg-Vorpommern, Germany. The seat of the Amt is in Teterow, itself not part of the Amt.

The Amt Mecklenburgische Schweiz consists of the following municipalities:

1. Alt Sührkow
2. Dahmen
3. Dalkendorf
4. Groß Roge
5. Groß Wokern
6. Groß Wüstenfelde
7. Hohen Demzin
8. Jördenstorf
9. Lelkendorf
10. Prebberede
11. Schorssow
12. Schwasdorf
13. Sukow-Levitzow
14. Thürkow
15. Warnkenhagen
