= Hohen Demzin =

- Municipality
- Location of Hohen Demzin within Rostock district
- Interactive map of Hohen Demzin
- Location within Germany Location within Mecklenburg-Vorpommern
- Coordinates: 53°43′00″N 12°33′00″E
- Country: Germany
- State: Mecklenburg-Vorpommern
- District: Rostock
- Municipal assoc.: Mecklenburgische Schweiz

Government
  - Mayor: Dieter Schwäblein

Area
  - Total: 24.11 km^{2} (9.31 sq mi)
- Elevation: 58 m (190 ft)

Population (2025-12-31)
  - Total: 354
  - Density: 14.7/km^{2} (38.0/sq mi)
- Time zone: UTC+01:00 (CET)
  - Summer (DST): UTC+02:00 (CEST)
- Postal codes: 17166
- Dialling codes: 03996
- Vehicle registration: LRO
- Website: www.amt-mecklenburgische-schweiz.de

Hohen Demzin is a municipality in the Rostock district, in Mecklenburg-Vorpommern, Germany.
