= Thürkow =

- Municipality
- Location of Thürkow within Rostock district
- Interactive map of Thürkow
- Location within Germany Location within Mecklenburg-Vorpommern
- Coordinates: 53°49′59″N 12°34′00″E
- Country: Germany
- State: Mecklenburg-Vorpommern
- District: Rostock
- Municipal assoc.: Mecklenburgische Schweiz

Government
  - Mayor: Berthold Falkenau

Area
  - Total: 14.61 km^{2} (5.64 sq mi)
- Elevation: 19 m (62 ft)

Population (2025-12-31)
  - Total: 367
  - Density: 25.1/km^{2} (65.1/sq mi)
- Time zone: UTC+01:00 (CET)
  - Summer (DST): UTC+02:00 (CEST)
- Postal codes: 17168
- Dialling codes: 039975
- Vehicle registration: LRO
- Website: www.amt-mecklenburgische-schweiz.de

Thürkow is a municipality in the Rostock district, in Mecklenburg-Vorpommern, Germany.
