= Groß Wokern =

- Municipality
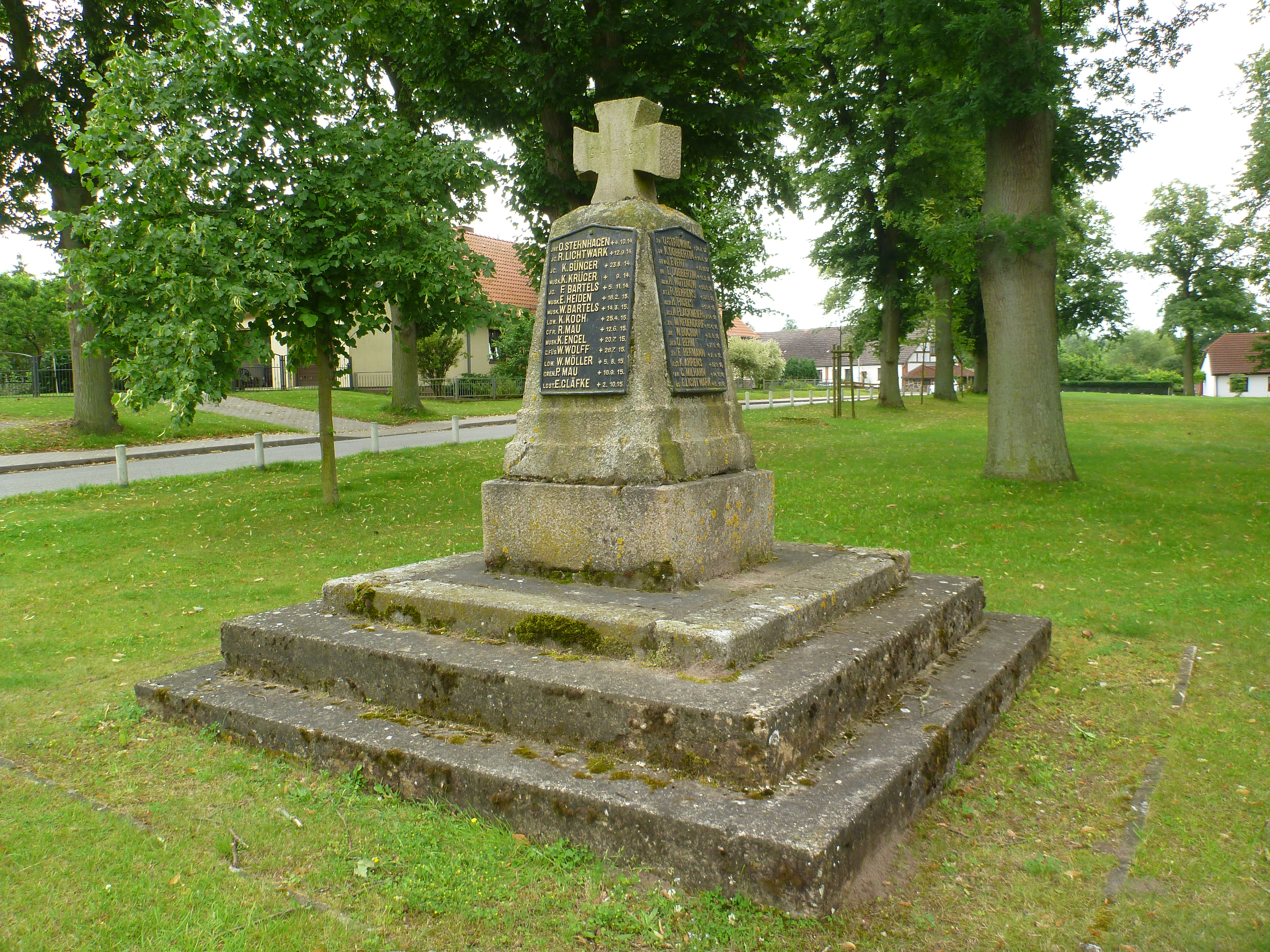
- War memorial in the village centre

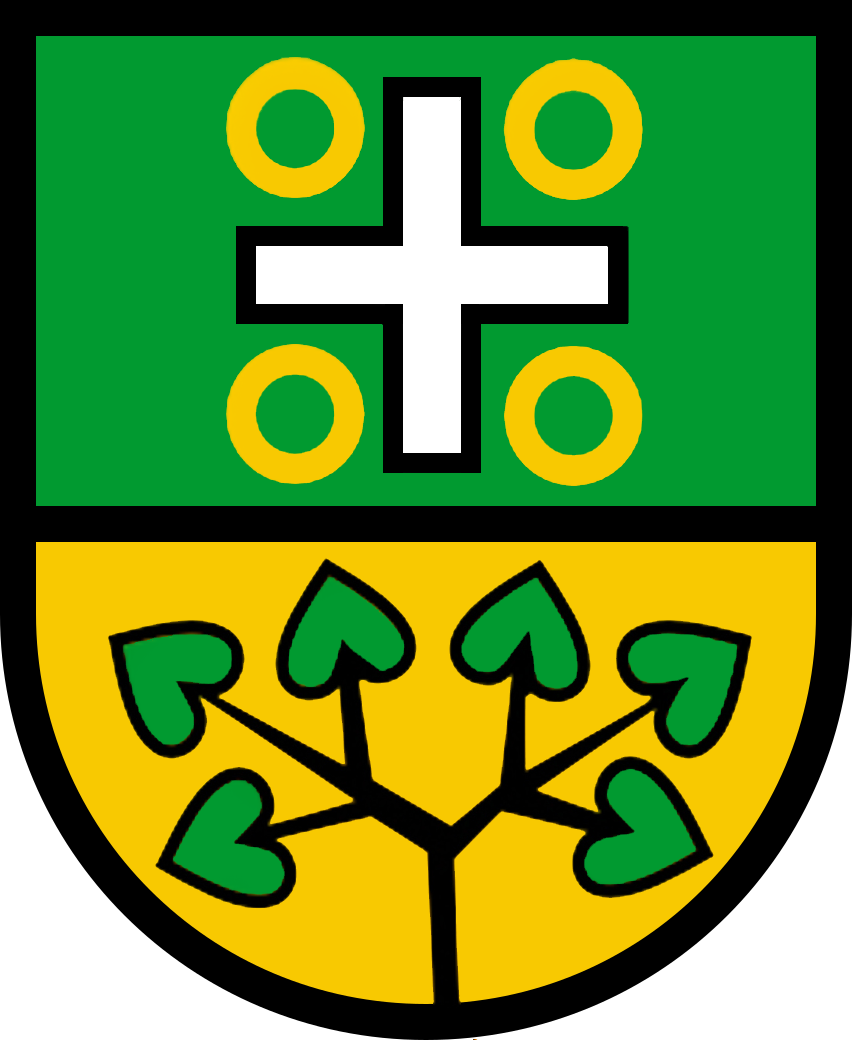
- Coat of arms

- Location of Groß Wokern within Rostock district
- Interactive map of Groß Wokern
- Location within Germany Location within Mecklenburg-Vorpommern
- Coordinates: 53°45′00″N 12°30′00″E
- Country: Germany
- State: Mecklenburg-Vorpommern
- District: Rostock
- Municipal assoc.: Mecklenburgische Schweiz

Government
  - Mayor: Wolfgang Beltz

Area
  - Total: 21.91 km^{2} (8.46 sq mi)
- Elevation: 54 m (177 ft)

Population (2025-12-31)
  - Total: 1,024
  - Density: 46.74/km^{2} (121.0/sq mi)
- Time zone: UTC+01:00 (CET)
  - Summer (DST): UTC+02:00 (CEST)
- Postal codes: 17166
- Dialling codes: 039978
- Vehicle registration: LRO
- Website: www.amt-mecklenburgische-schweiz.de

Groß Wokern is a municipality in the Rostock district, in Mecklenburg-Vorpommern, Germany.
