= Malchin =

Town in Mecklenburg-Vorpommern, Germany

- Town
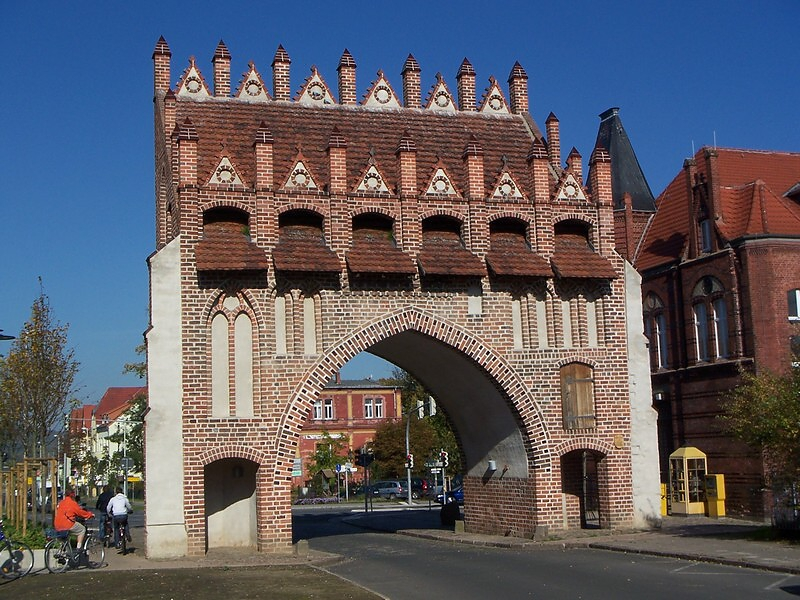
- Brick Gothic town gate of Malchin (Kalensches Tor)

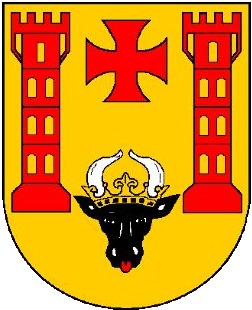
- Coat of arms

- Location of Malchin within Mecklenburgische Seenplatte district
- Interactive map of Malchin
- Location within Germany Location within Mecklenburg-Vorpommern
- Coordinates: 53°44′N 12°47′E
- Country: Germany
- State: Mecklenburg-Vorpommern
- District: Mecklenburgische Seenplatte
- Municipal assoc.: Malchin am Kummerower See
- Subdivisions: 8

Government
  - Mayor: Axel Müller (CDU)

Area
  - Total: 109.27 km^{2} (42.19 sq mi)
- Elevation: 10 m (33 ft)

Population (2025-12-31)
  - Total: 6,667
  - Density: 61.01/km^{2} (158.0/sq mi)
- Time zone: UTC+01:00 (CET)
  - Summer (DST): UTC+02:00 (CEST)
- Postal codes: 17139
- Dialling codes: 03994, 03996, 039957
- Vehicle registration: MSE, AT, DM, MC, MST, MÜR, NZ, RM, WRN
- Website: www.amt-malchin-am-kummerower-see.de

Malchin (German pronunciation: [malˈçiːn]) is a town in the Mecklenburgische Seenplatte district, in Mecklenburg-Western Pomerania, in north-eastern Germany.

== History ==
The name of the town is of Slavic origin. It was granted town rights in 1236.

During World War II, in February 1945, a German-perpetrated death march of Allied prisoners-of-war from the Stalag XX-B POW camp passed through the town.

The former municipality Duckow was merged into Malchin in January 2019.

== Sights ==
It offers some notable landmarks, such as two Brick Gothic town gates, a medieval defense tower, the Gothic town church of St. John and the Neo Baroque town hall.

== Notable people ==
- Joachim Christian Timm (1734-1805 in Malchin), a German apothecary & mayor of Malchin
- Siegfried Marcus (1831-1898), inventor, made the first petrol-powered vehicle in 1864
- Cordula Wöhler (1845–1916), writer and hymnwriter
- Hans-Joachim Griephan (born 1937), a German journalist, publisher and local politician
- Thomas Doll (born 1966), footballer, played 357 games and 18 for Germany
