= Peenestrom =

River in Germany

Coordinates: 54°4′11″N 13°47′37″E

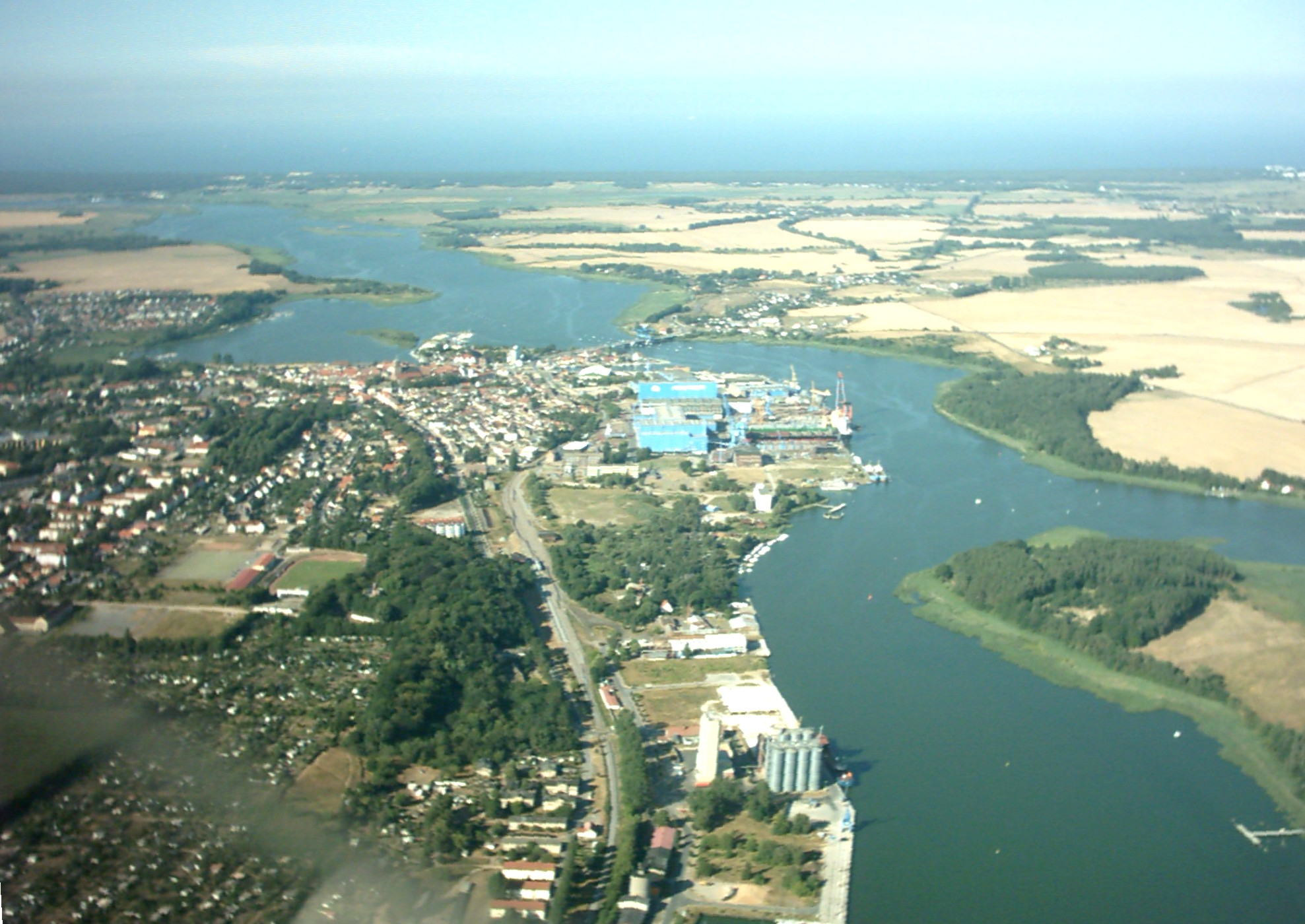
The Peenestrom at Wolgast

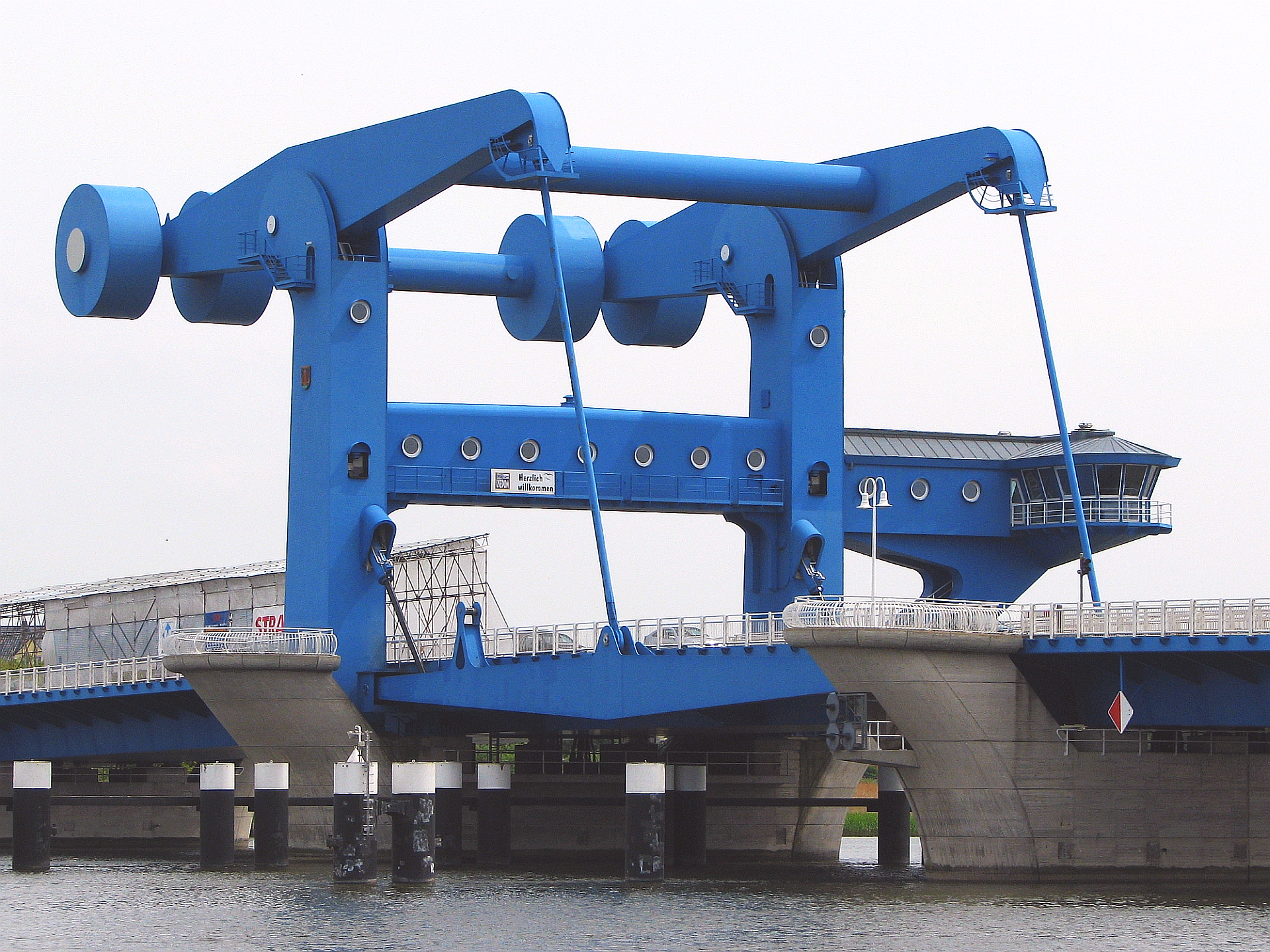
Bascule bridge over the Peenestrom

The Peenestrom is a strait in Mecklenburg-Vorpommern, Germany, which separates the mainland from the island of Usedom. It is 20 km (12.4 mi) long and is the westernmost connection between the Szczecin Lagoon and the Baltic Sea (together with the Świna and Dziwna channels). The Peenestrom is one of the three distributaries of the Oder River.
