= Lake Kummerow =

Lake in Germany

Lake Kummerow (Kummerower See)
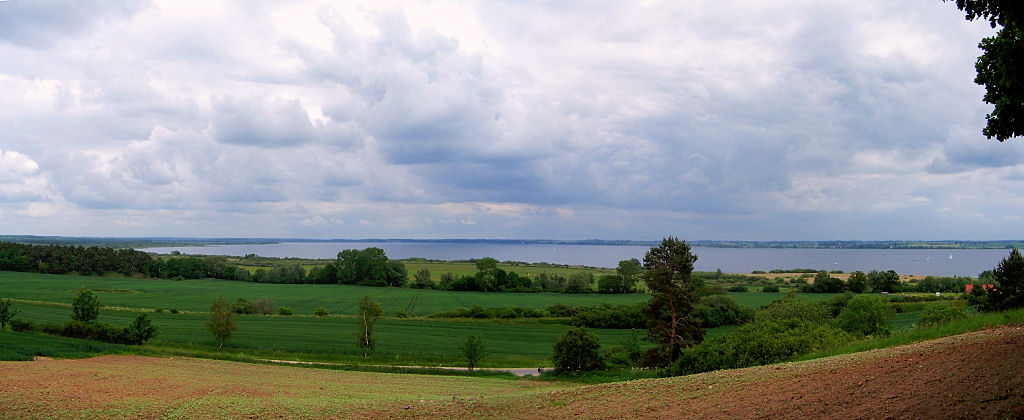

- Location within Mecklenburg-Vorpommern
- Location: Mecklenburgische Seenplatte, Mecklenburg-Western Pomerania
- Coordinates: 53°48′30″N 12°51′34″E
- Primary inflows: (West-)Peene, Peene Canal (Malchiner Peene)
- Primary outflows: Peene
- Basin countries: Germany
- Max. length: 10.75 km (6.68 mi)
- Max. width: 4.8 km (3.0 mi)
- Surface area: 32.55 km^{2} (12.57 sq mi)
- Average depth: 8.1 m (27 ft)
- Max. depth: 23.3 m (76 ft)
- Water volume: 0.3 km^{3} (0.072 cu mi)
- Surface elevation: 0.3 m (1 ft 0 in)
- Settlements: Kummerow

Lake Kummerow (German: Kummerower See) is a lake in the Mecklenburgische Seenplatte district, Mecklenburg-Vorpommern, Germany. At an elevation of 0.3 m, its surface area is 32.55 km^{2}. Its outflow is the Peene. It is situated southwest of Demmin. It is named after the village Kummerow on its southern shore.
