= German submarine U-36 (S186) =

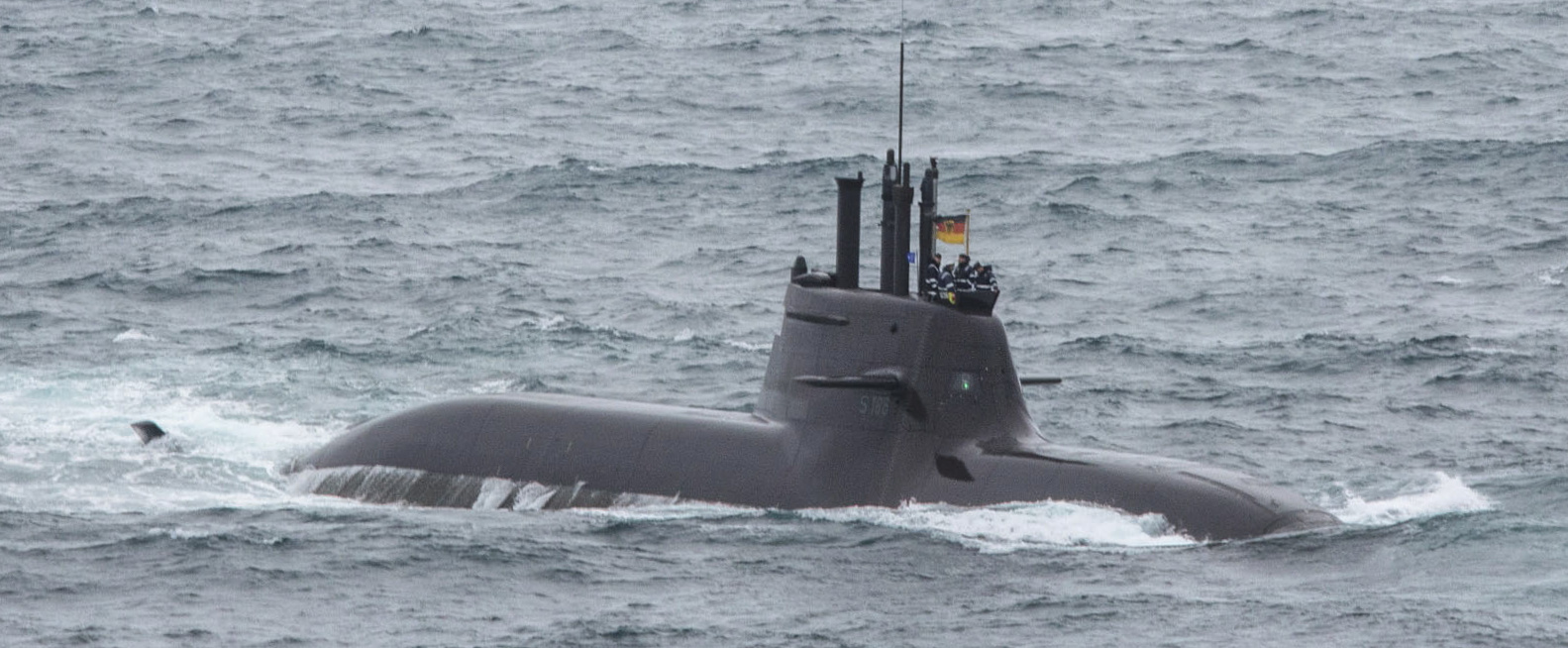
- U-36 in 2020

History

Germany
- Name: U-36
- Builder: Howaldtswerke, Kiel
- Laid down: 19 August 2008
- Launched: 6 February 2013
- Commissioned: 10 October 2016
- Status: In active service

General characteristics
- Class & type: Type 212
- Type: submarine
- Displacement: 1,450 tonnes (1,430 long tons) surfaced; 1,830 tonnes (1,800 long tons) submerged
- Length: 56 m (183.7 ft); 57.2 m (187.66 ft) (2nd batch)
- Beam: 7 m (22.96 ft)
- Draft: 6 m (19.68 ft)
- Installed power: 1 x MTU-396 16V (2,150 kW); 1 x Siemens Permasyn electric motor Type FR6439-3900KW (2,850 kW)
- Propulsion: 1 MTU 16V 396 diesel-engine; 9 HDW/Siemens PEM fuel cells, 30–40 kW each (U31); 2 HDW/Siemens PEM fuel cells each with 120 kW (U32, U33, U34); 1 Siemens Permasyn electric motor 1700 kW, driving a single seven-bladed skewback propeller
- Speed: 20 knots (37 km/h) submerged, 12 knots surfaced
- Range: 8,000 nm (14,800 km, or 9,196 miles) at 8 knots (15 km/h) surfaced; 3 weeks without snorkeling, 12 weeks overall
- Endurance: Surface 14,800 km at 15 km/h, Subsurface 780 km at 15 km/h, 3,000 nmi at 4 kn,
- Test depth: over 700 m (2,296 ft)
- Complement: 5 officers, 22 men
- Sensors & processing systems: CSU 90 (DBQS-40FTC), Sonar: ISUS90-20, Radar: Kelvin Hughes Type 1007 I-band nav.,
- Electronic warfare & decoys: EADS FL 1800U suite
- Armament: 6 x 533 mm torpedo tubes (in 2 forward pointing groups of 3) with 13 DM2A4, A184 Mod.3, Black Shark Torpedo, IDAS missiles and 24 external naval mines (optional)

U-36 (S186) is a Type 212A submarine of the German Navy. She is the sixth ship of the class to enter service.

She was laid down in August 2008 by Howaldtswerke, Kiel, launched in February 2013 and commissioned on 10 October 2016. She is under the patronage of the town of Plauen, in Saxony. The commissioning ceremony took place at Eckernförde in the presence of the Deputy Inspector of the Navy and Commander of the Fleet and Support Staff, Vice-Admiral Rainer Brinkmann, the Minister of the Interior and Federal Affairs of the State of Schleswig-Holstein, Stefan Studt, the head of the Schleswig-Holstein State Chancellery Thomas Losse-Müller, and the commander of Einsatzflottille 1 Jan Christian Kaack. U-36's first commander on commissioning was Korvettenkapitän Christoph Ploß.

== Service ==
U-36 is currently part of the 1. Ubootgeschwader (lit. '1st Submarine Squadron'), based in Eckernförde. In January 2015, Der Spiegel reported that significant problems had been found with U-36 and her sister submarine U-35. The drive shaft system, battery, radar and the radio buoy were all found to be malfunctioning. In March 2015, U-36 began trials in the Kattegat off Kristiansand.
