= German submarine U-34 (S184) =

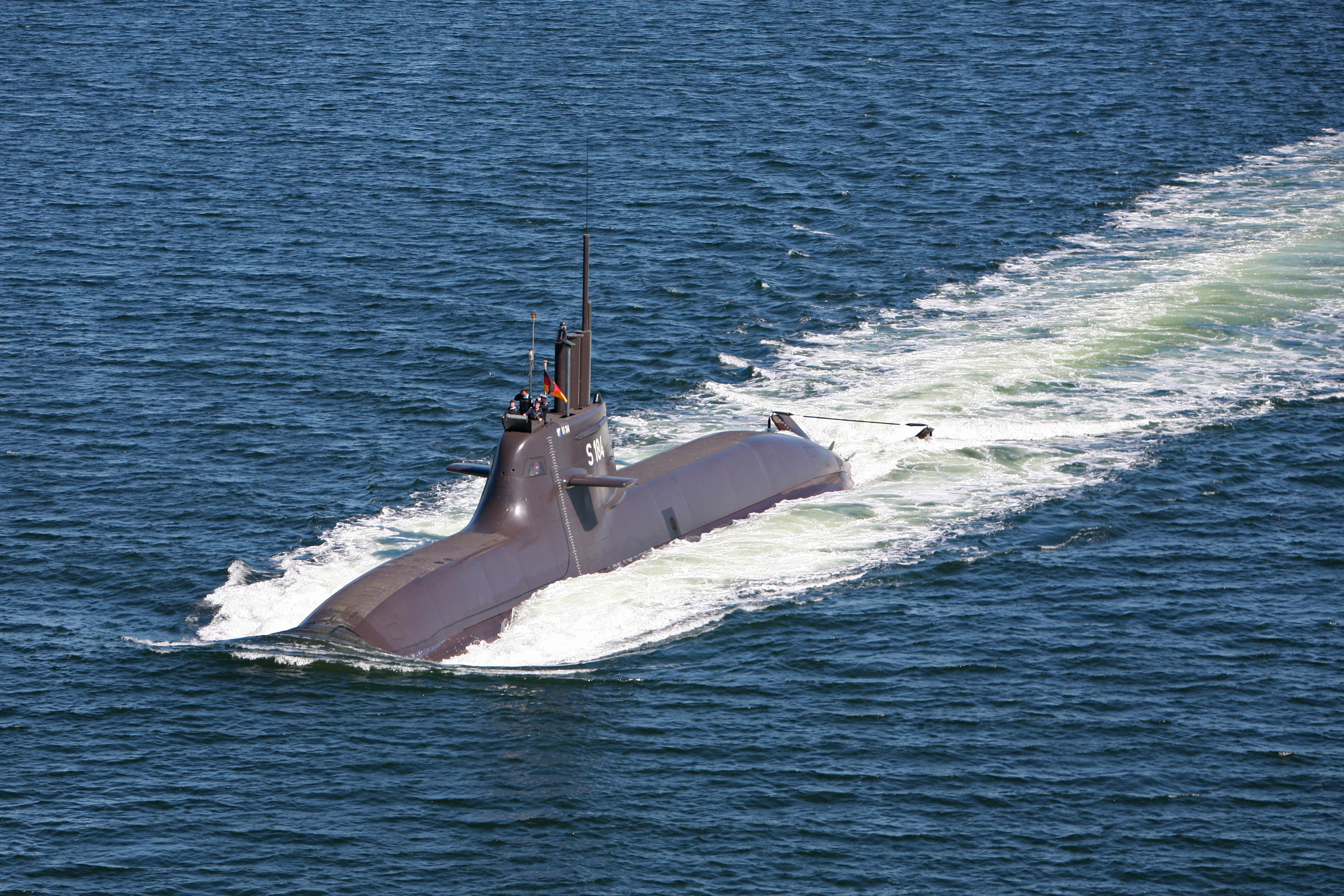

History

Germany
- Name: U-34
- Builder: Howaldtswerke, Kiel
- Laid down: December 2001
- Launched: July 2006
- Commissioned: 3 May 2007
- Status: In active service

General characteristics
- Class & type: Type 212
- Type: submarine
- Displacement: 1,450 tonnes (1,430 long tons) surfaced; 1,830 tonnes (1,800 long tons) submerged
- Length: 56 m (183.7 ft); 57.2 m (187.66 ft) (2nd batch)
- Beam: 7 m (22.96 ft)
- Draft: 6 m (19.68 ft)
- Installed power: 1 x MTU-396 16V (2,150 kW); 1 x Siemens Permasyn electric motor Type FR6439-3900KW (2,850 kW)
- Propulsion: 1 MTU 16V 396 diesel-engine; 9 HDW/Siemens PEM fuel cells, 30–40 kW each (U31); 2 HDW/Siemens PEM fuel cells each with 120 kW (U32, U33, U34); 1 Siemens Permasyn electric motor 1700 kW, driving a single seven-bladed skewback propeller
- Speed: 20 knots (37 km/h) submerged, 12 knots surfaced
- Range: 8,000 nmi (14,800 km, or 9,196 miles) at 8 knots (15 km/h) surfaced; 3 weeks without snorkeling, 12 weeks overall
- Endurance: Surface 14,800 km at 15 km/h, Subsurface 780 km at 15 km/h, 3,000 nmi at 4 kn,
- Test depth: over 700 m (2,296 ft)
- Complement: 5 officers, 22 men
- Sensors & processing systems: CSU 90 (DBQS-40FTC), Sonar: ISUS90-20, Radar: Kelvin Hughes Type 1007 I-band nav.,
- Electronic warfare & decoys: EADS FL 1800U suite
- Armament: 6 x 533 mm torpedo tubes (in 2 forward pointing groups of 3) with 13 DM2A4, A184 Mod.3, Black Shark Torpedo, IDAS missiles and 24 external naval mines (optional)

U-34 (S184) is a Type 212A submarine of the German Navy. She is the fourth ship of the class to enter service.

She was laid down in December 2001 by Howaldtswerke, Kiel, launched in July 2006 and commissioned on 3 May 2007. She is under the patronage of the Bavarian town of Starnberg.

== Service ==
U-34 is currently part of the 1. Ubootgeschwader (lit. '1st Submarine Squadron'), based in Eckernförde. She sailed from Eckernförde on 22 January 2009, bound for the Mediterranean to participate in the anti-terrorism mission Operation Active Endeavour. She was again deployed with Operation Active Endeavour in the south-eastern Mediterranean in May 2011. During this time she trialled the multi-crew concept, with three crews taking turns manning the submarine until her return to port on 11 December 2011. This was deemed a success, with the sailors' time commitment and the downtime of the boat significantly reduced.

On 25 May 2015 U-34 left Eckernförde and arrived at Tallinn on 30 May to join Standing NATO Maritime Group 2, taking part in exercises in the Baltic Sea as the group's 'Silent Partner'. In September she took part in multinational CASEX exercises in the Baltic, with surface ships of the German, Polish and Swedish navies. In October U-34 took part in Grüner Aal (transl. Green Eel) manoeuvres, a series of torpedo training exercises with the Royal Norwegian Navy. On 30 March 2016 U-34 deployed from Eckernförde to the coast of Scotland, joining Standing NATO Maritime Group 1 and taking part in Exercise Joint Warrior, returning to her homeport in May.
