= German submarine U-33 (S183) =

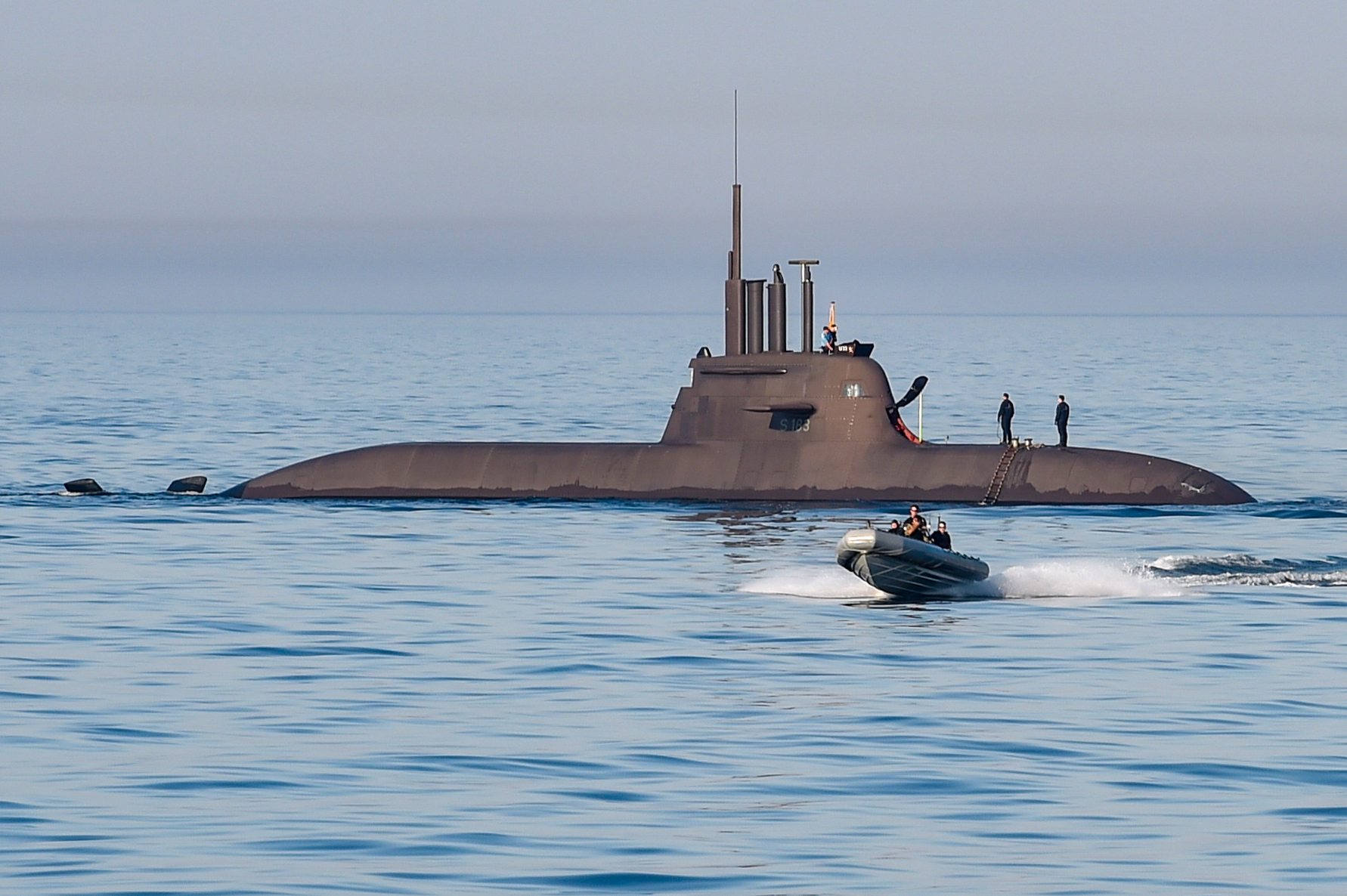
- U-33

History

Germany
- Name: U-33
- Builder: Howaldtswerke, Kiel
- Laid down: 30 April 2001
- Launched: September 2004
- Commissioned: 13 June 2006
- Status: In active service

General characteristics
- Class & type: Type 212
- Type: submarine
- Displacement: 1,450 tonnes (1,430 long tons) surfaced; 1,830 tonnes (1,800 long tons) submerged
- Length: 56 m (183.7 ft); 57.2 m (187.66 ft) (2nd batch)
- Beam: 7 m (22.96 ft)
- Draft: 6 m (19.68 ft)
- Installed power: 1 x MTU-396 16V (2,150 kW); 1 x Siemens Permasyn electric motor Type FR6439-3900KW (2,850 kW)
- Propulsion: 1 MTU 16V 396 diesel-engine; 9 HDW/Siemens PEM fuel cells, 30–40 kW each (U31); 2 HDW/Siemens PEM fuel cells each with 120 kW (U32, U33, U34); 1 Siemens Permasyn electric motor 1700 kW, driving a single seven-bladed skewback propeller
- Speed: 20 knots (37 km/h) submerged, 12 knots surfaced
- Range: 8,000 nmi (14,800 km, or 9,196 miles) at 8 knots (15 km/h) surfaced; 3 weeks without snorkeling, 12 weeks overall
- Endurance: Surface 14,800 km at 15 km/h, Subsurface 780 km at 15 km/h, 3,000 nmi at 4 kn,
- Test depth: over 700 m (2,296 ft)
- Complement: 5 officers, 22 men
- Sensors & processing systems: CSU 90 (DBQS-40FTC), Sonar: ISUS90-20, Radar: Kelvin Hughes Type 1007 I-band nav.,
- Electronic warfare & decoys: EADS FL 1800U suite
- Armament: 6 x 533 mm torpedo tubes (in 2 forward pointing groups of 3) with 13 DM2A4, A184 Mod.3, Black Shark Torpedo, IDAS missiles and 24 external naval mines (optional)

U-33 (S183) is the third Type 212A submarine of the German Navy.

It was laid down 30 April 2001 by HDW in Kiel, launched in September 2004 and commissioned on 13 June 2006.

== Service history ==
U-33 is currently part of the 1. Ubootgeschwader (lit. '1st Submarine Squadron'), based in Eckernförde. The submarine's first mission was participation in Operation Active Endeavour in 2007.
