= German submarine U-31 (S181) =

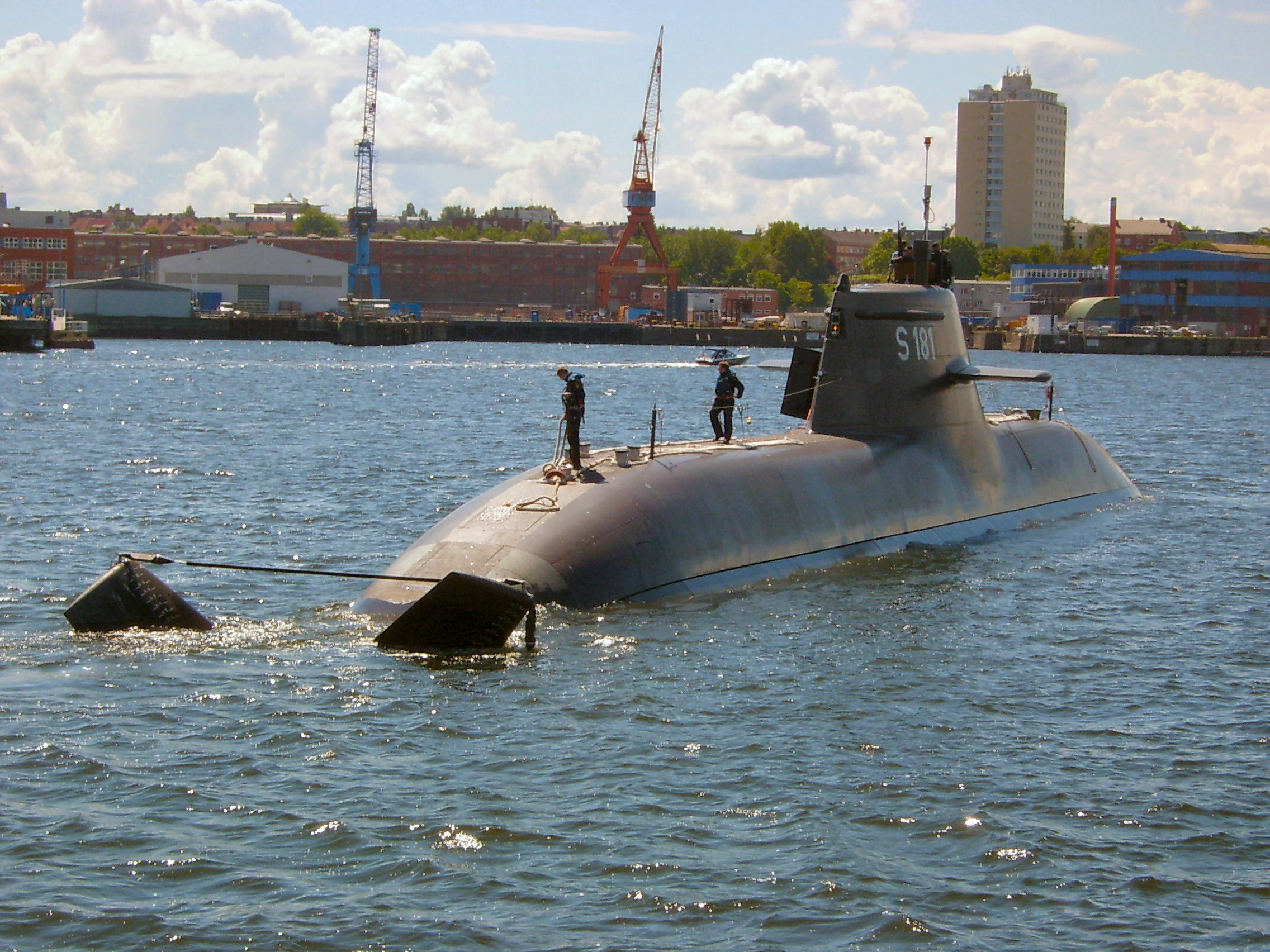

History

Germany
- Name: U-31
- Builder: Nordseewerke, Emden; Howaldtswerke, Kiel
- Launched: 20 March 2002
- Commissioned: 19 October 2005
- Status: in service.
- Class & type: Type 212A

General characteristics
- Class & type: Type 212
- Type: submarine
- Displacement: 1,450 tonnes (1,430 long tons) surfaced; 1,830 tonnes (1,800 long tons) submerged
- Length: 56 m (183.7 ft); 57.2 m (187.66 ft) (2nd batch)
- Beam: 7 m (22.96 ft)
- Draft: 6 m (19.68 ft)
- Installed power: 1 x MTU-396 16V (2,150 kW); 1 x Siemens Permasyn electric motor Type FR6439-3900KW (2,850 kW)
- Propulsion: 1 MTU 16V 396 diesel-engine; 9 HDW/Siemens PEM fuel cells, 30–40 kW each (U31); 2 HDW/Siemens PEM fuel cells each with 120 kW (U32, U33, U34); 1 Siemens Permasyn electric motor 1700 kW, driving a single seven-bladed skewback propeller
- Speed: 20 knots (37 km/h) submerged, 12 knots surfaced
- Range: 8,000 nmi (14,800 km, or 9,196 miles) at 8 knots (15 km/h) surfaced; 3 weeks without snorkeling, 12 weeks overall
- Endurance: Surface 14,800 km at 15 km/h, Subsurface 780 km at 15 km/h, 3,000 nmi at 4 kn,
- Test depth: over 700 m (2,296 ft)
- Complement: 5 officers, 22 men
- Sensors & processing systems: CSU 90 (DBQS-40FTC), Sonar: ISUS90-20, Radar: Kelvin Hughes Type 1007 I-band nav.,
- Electronic warfare & decoys: EADS FL 1800U suite
- Armament: 6 x 533 mm torpedo tubes (in 2 forward pointing groups of 3) with 13 DM2A4, A184 Mod.3, Black Shark Torpedo, IDAS missiles and 24 external naval mines (optional)

U-31 (S181) is a Type 212A submarine of the German Navy, and the lead ship of her class.

U-31 was built by TKMS, with construction taking place at the shipyards of Thyssen Nordseewerke of Emden and Howaldtswerke at Kiel. Launched on 20 March 2002, U-31 was commissioned alongside her sister ship U-32 by German Minister of Defence Peter Struck in Eckernförde on 19 October 2005. U-31 is propelled by one diesel engine and an electric motor driven by nine fuel cells, making the submarine virtually undetectable.

Korvettenkapitän Bert Petzold is the submarine's commanding officer.

== History ==
U-31 was built in two sections, the stern and propulsion by Nordseewerke, Emden and the bow at Howaldtswerke-Deutsche Werft, Kiel. The boats of the Type 212A class cost around €500 million to build. Equipped with fuel cell technology and stealth skin, they are almost undetectable, and are able to remain submerged for up to three weeks. The fuel cells are virtually emission free, with the exception of distilled water, resulting in less noise, heat and exhaust fumes.

U-31 and U-32 were commissioned in a joint ceremony at Eckernförde on 19 October 2005 by Defence Minister Peter Struck, in the presence of the Inspector of the Navy Vice- Admiral Wolfgang E. Nolting. They and their sister ships are stationed in Eckernförde and form part of the 1st Submarine Squadron (1. Ubootgeschwader) in Einsatzflottille 1.

== General references ==
- Rössler, Eberhard (2004). Die neuen deutschen U-Boote (in German). Bonn: Bernard & Graefe Verlag. ISBN 3-7637-6258-2.
- "Uboot Klasse 212 A" (in German). German Navy. 15 July 2010.
