= German submarine U-35 (S185) =

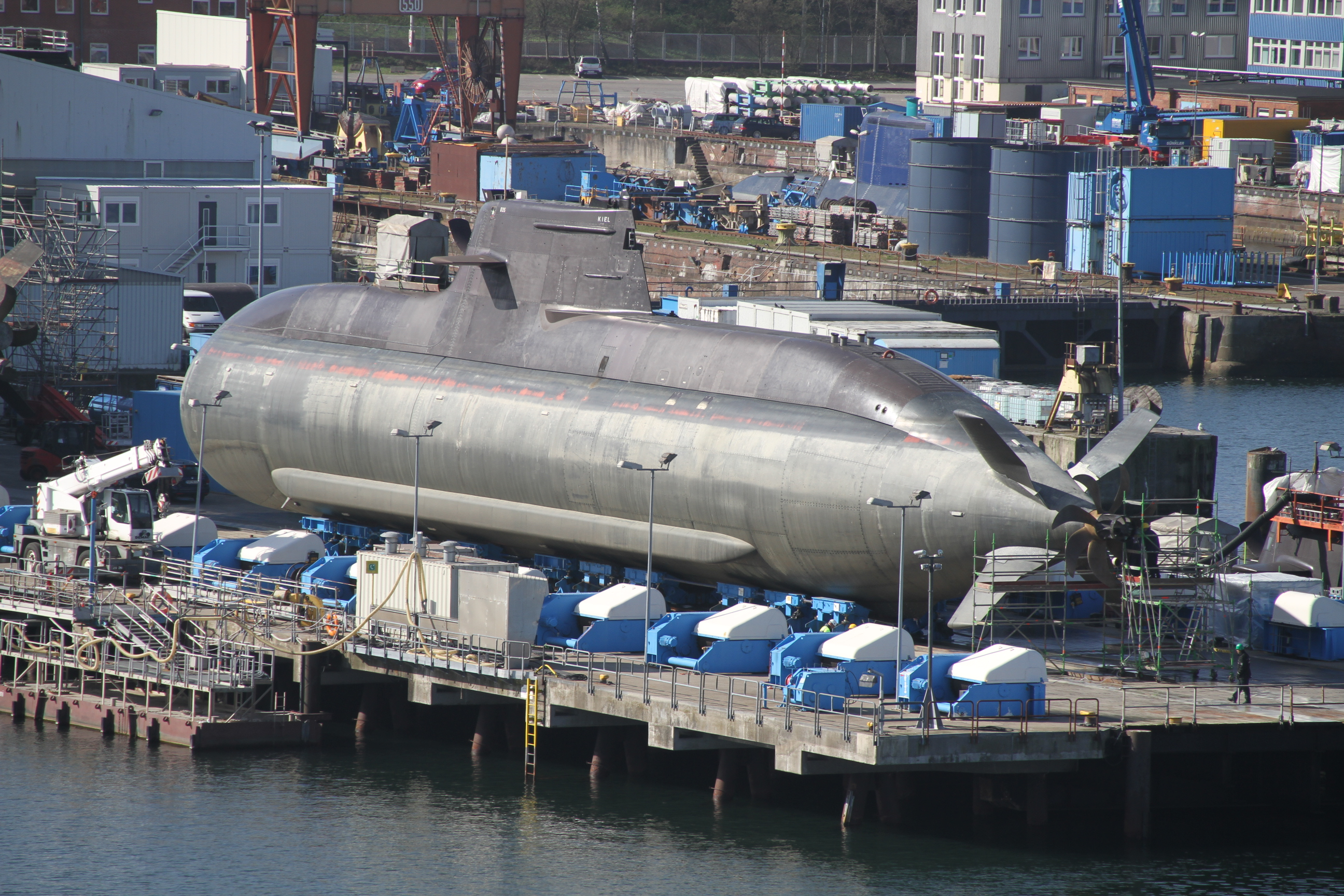

History

Germany
- Name: U-35
- Builder: Howaldtswerke, Kiel
- Laid down: 21 August 2007
- Launched: 15 November 2011
- Commissioned: 23 March 2015
- Status: In active service

General characteristics
- Class & type: Type 212
- Type: submarine
- Displacement: 1,450 tonnes (1,430 long tons) surfaced; 1,830 tonnes (1,800 long tons) submerged
- Length: 56 m (183.7 ft); 57.2 m (187.66 ft) (2nd batch)
- Beam: 7 m (22.96 ft)
- Draft: 6 m (19.68 ft)
- Installed power: 1 x MTU-396 16V (2,150 kW); 1 x Siemens Permasyn electric motor Type FR6439-3900KW (2,850 kW)
- Propulsion: 1 MTU 16V 396 diesel-engine; 9 HDW/Siemens PEM fuel cells, 30–40 kW each (U31); 2 HDW/Siemens PEM fuel cells each with 120 kW (U32, U33, U34); 1 Siemens Permasyn electric motor 1700 kW, driving a single seven-bladed skewback propeller
- Speed: 20 knots (37 km/h) submerged, 12 knots surfaced
- Range: 8,000 nmi (14,800 km, or 9,196 miles) at 8 knots (15 km/h) surfaced; 3 weeks without snorkeling, 12 weeks overall
- Endurance: Surface 14,800 km at 15 km/h, Subsurface 780 km at 15 km/h, 3,000 nmi at 4 kn,
- Test depth: over 700 m (2,296 ft)
- Complement: 5 officers, 22 men
- Sensors & processing systems: CSU 90 (DBQS-40FTC), Sonar: ISUS90-20, Radar: Kelvin Hughes Type 1007 I-band nav.,
- Electronic warfare & decoys: EADS FL 1800U suite
- Armament: 6 x 533 mm torpedo tubes (in 2 forward pointing groups of 3) with 13 DM2A4, A184 Mod.3, Black Shark Torpedo, IDAS missiles and 24 external naval mines (optional)

U-35 (S185) is a Type 212A submarine of the German Navy. She is the fifth ship of the class to enter service.

She was laid down in August 2007 by Howaldtswerke, Kiel, launched in November 2011 and commissioned on 23 March 2015. She is under the patronage of the city of Zweibrücken, in Rhineland-Palatinate. Her sponsor is Sigrid Hubert-Reichling, wife of the Lord Mayor of Zweibrücken, Helmut Reichling.

== Service ==
U-35 is currently part of the 1. Ubootgeschwader (lit. '1st Submarine Squadron'), based in Eckernförde. In January 2015, Der Spiegel reported that significant problems had been found with U-35 and her sister submarine U-36. The drive shaft system, battery, radar and the radio buoy were all found to be malfunctioning.

In October 2017 U-35 entered dock at the ThyssenKrupp Marine Systems yard at, Kiel for inspection after damaging her rudder during deep water testing in the Kattegat off Kristiansand. She had been operating in Norwegian waters prior to 15 October carrying out operational tests.

From 12 June 2021 to 14 December 2021, U-35 participated in Operation Irini.
