= German submarine U-32 (S182) =

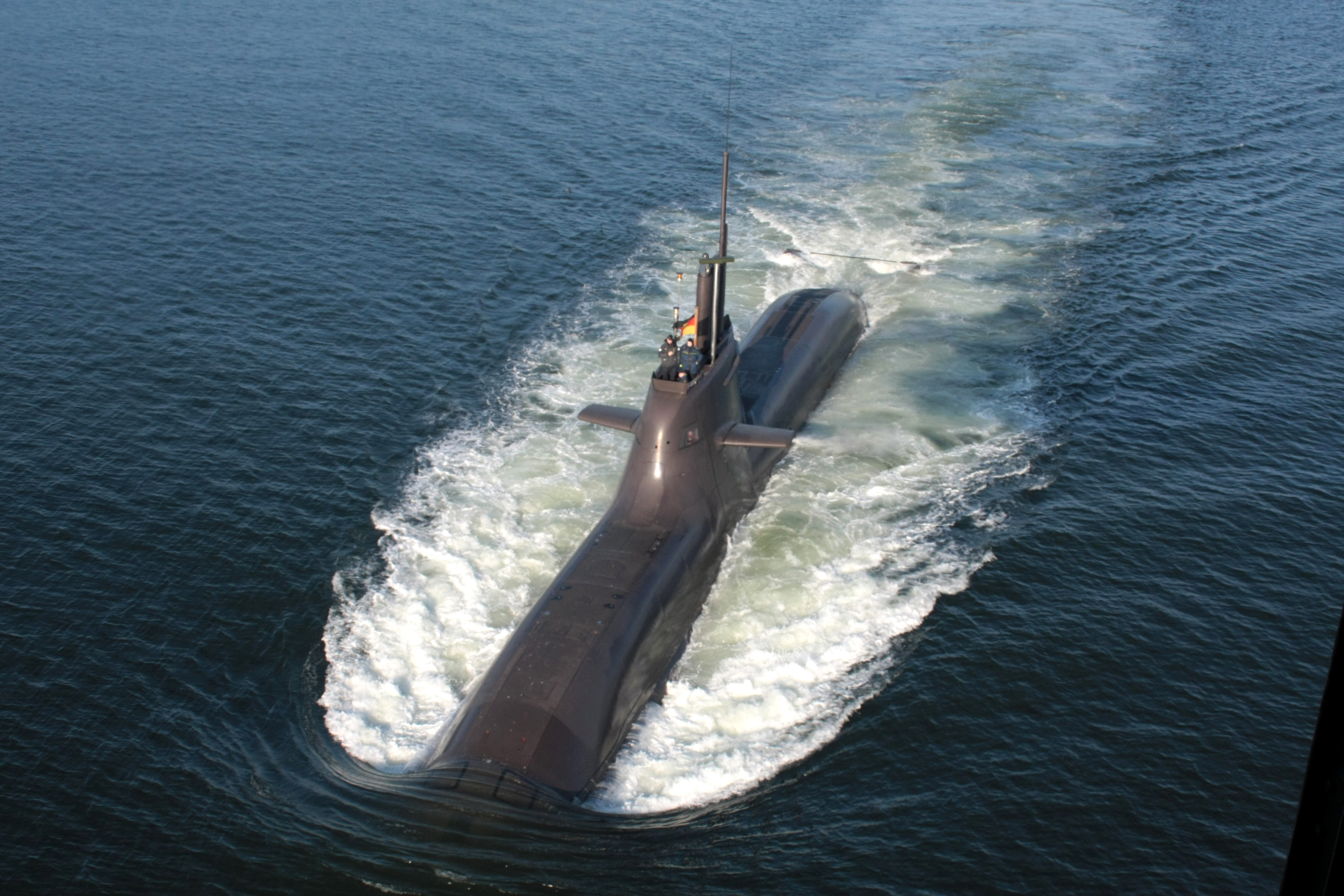
- U-32 at sea

History

Germany
- Name: U-32
- Builder: Nordseewerke, Emden; Howaldtswerke, Kiel
- Launched: December 4, 2003
- Commissioned: October 19, 2005
- Status: In active service

General characteristics
- Class & type: Type 212
- Type: submarine
- Displacement: 1,450 tonnes (1,430 long tons) surfaced; 1,830 tonnes (1,800 long tons) submerged
- Length: 56 m (183.7 ft); 57.2 m (187.66 ft) (2nd batch)
- Beam: 7 m (22.96 ft)
- Draft: 6 m (19.68 ft)
- Installed power: 1 x MTU-396 16V (2,150 kW); 1 x Siemens Permasyn electric motor Type FR6439-3900KW (2,850 kW)
- Propulsion: 1 MTU 16V 396 diesel-engine; 9 HDW/Siemens PEM fuel cells, 30–40 kW each (U31); 2 HDW/Siemens PEM fuel cells each with 120 kW (U32, U33, U34); 1 Siemens Permasyn electric motor 1700 kW, driving a single seven-bladed skewback propeller
- Speed: 20 knots (37 km/h) submerged, 12 knots surfaced
- Range: 8,000 nmi (14,800 km, or 9,196 miles) at 8 knots (15 km/h) surfaced; 3 weeks without snorkeling, 12 weeks overall
- Endurance: Surface 14,800 km at 15 km/h, Subsurface 780 km at 15 km/h, 3,000 nmi at 4 kn,
- Test depth: over 700 m (2,296 ft)
- Complement: 5 officers, 22 men
- Sensors & processing systems: CSU 90 (DBQS-40FTC), Sonar: ISUS90-20, Radar: Kelvin Hughes Type 1007 I-band nav.,
- Electronic warfare & decoys: EADS FL 1800U suite
- Armament: 6 x 533 mm torpedo tubes (in 2 forward pointing groups of 3) with 13 DM2A4, A184 Mod.3, Black Shark Torpedo, IDAS missiles and 24 external naval mines (optional)

U-32 (S182) is a Type 212A submarine of the German Navy, the second of her class to enter service.

U-32 was built by the German Submarine Consortium at the shipyards of Thyssen Nordseewerke of Emden and Howaldtswerke-Deutsche Werft at Kiel. She was launched on 4 December 2003, and was commissioned in a joint ceremony with her sister ship U-31 by the German Minister of Defence, Peter Struck, in Eckernförde on 19 October 2005. U-32 is propelled by one diesel engine and an electric motor driven by two fuel cells and features a cavitation-free screw, making her virtually undetectable. U-32 was the first non-nuclear submarine to stay submerged for two weeks.

Korvettenkapitän Michael Bornholt is U-32's commanding officer.

In March 2013, U-32 crossed the Atlantic Ocean to participate in exercises on the east coast of the United States. During the journey, the submarine remained submerged for 18 days, the longest of any German submarine at the time.

== Bibliography ==
- Rössler, Eberhard (2004). Die neuen deutschen U-Boote (in German). Bonn: Bernard & Graefe Verlag. ISBN 3-7637-6258-2.
- "Uboot Klasse 212 A" (in German). German Navy. 15 July 2010.
