= 1st Ubootgeschwader =

1. Ubootgeschwader (1st Submarine Squadron)
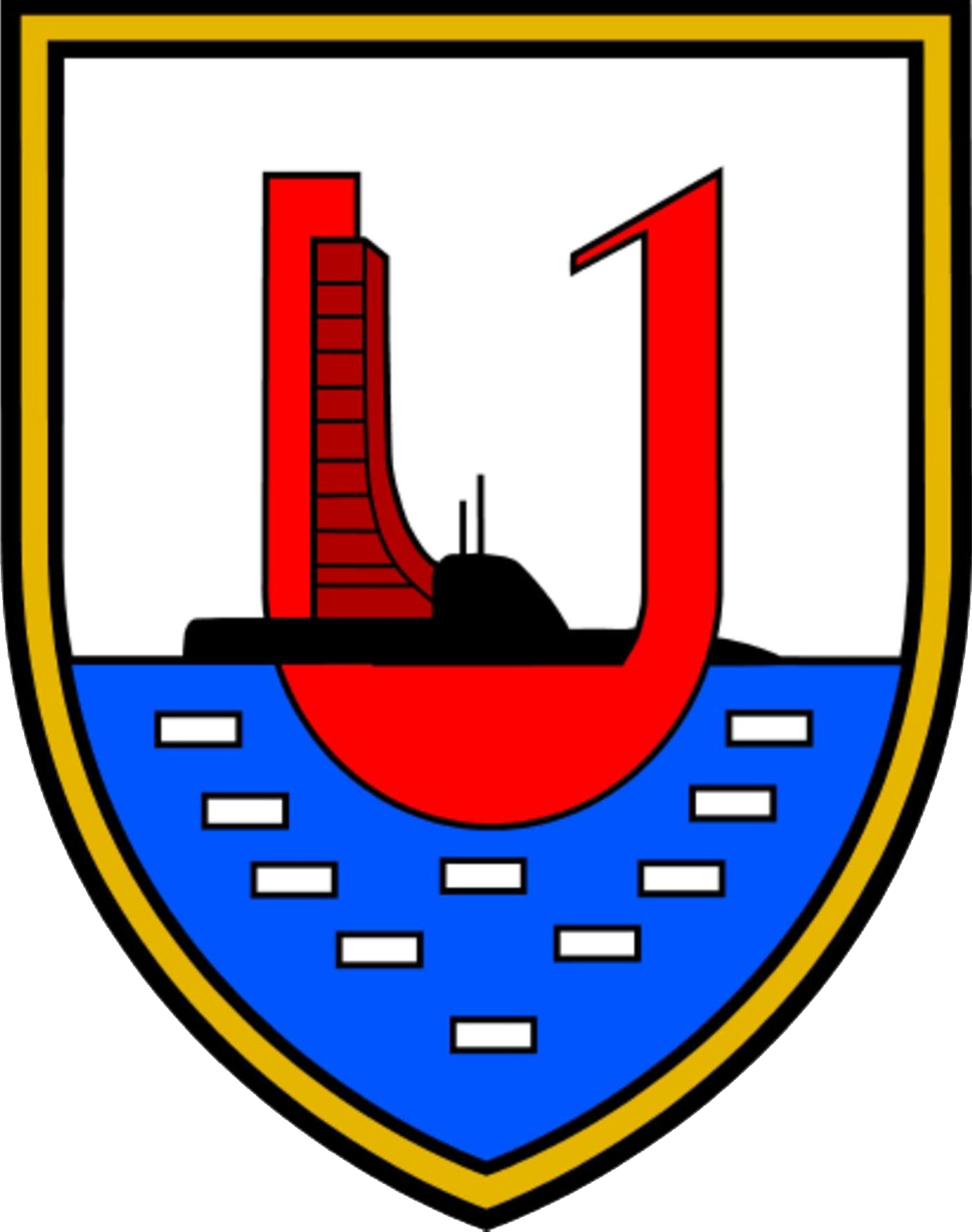
- Coat of arms of the 1. Ubootgeschwader
- Active: 1 October 1961 to present
- Country: Germany
- Branch: German Navy
- Part of: Einsatzflottille 1
- Garrison/HQ: Eckernförde, Schleswig-Holstein, Germany

Commanders
- Current commander: Fregattenkapitän Frédéric Strauch

The 1. Ubootgeschwader (lit. '1st Submarine Squadron', and abbreviated in German as 1. UG) is a submarine squadron of the German Navy. It is based at Eckernförde, Schleswig-Holstein, and forms part of Einsatzflottille 1, headquartered in Kiel.

== History ==
The 1. Ubootgeschwader (1st UG) was set up on 1 October 1961 in Kiel. It was initially under the control of the Amphibische Gruppe, before it was subordinated to the newly established Ubootflottille on 1 November. The 1st UG received its first submarine, the newly-commissioned Type 201 submarine U-1, on 21 March 1962. The U-1 was the first submarine constructed in post-war Germany. U-1's sister ship, U-2 followed in May 1962. The former R boat Merkur was assigned to the squadron as a support ship. The Type 201 submarines were eventually found to be unsatisfactory and were decommissioned early. The successor class, the Type 205 submarine, entered service in the following years, with eleven boats joining the squadron between 1962 and 1969. In 1964, the two submarine tenders Lahn and Lech entered service with the 1st UG. Lech was decommissioned in 1966 and assigned to the Reserve Fleet. Merkur left service the same year.

As part of the reforms of the Bundeswehr the Submarine Training Centre was made a part of the 1st UG on 29 August 2013. Since October 2016 the German submarine arm consists of six Type 212 submarines. However because of damage and missing spare parts, none of the six boats were in active service as of October 2017.

== Composition ==
- Six Type 212 submarines
  - U-31
  - U-32
  - U-33
  - U-34
  - U-35
  - U-36
- Three Oste-class fleet service ships
  - Oste
  - Oker
  - Alster
- One Elbe-class replenishment ship
  - Main
- Submarine Training Centre
