= Scirè =

Scirè may refer to:

- Italian submarine Scirè (1938), of the Adua class, which fought during World War II for Regia Marina
- Italian submarine Scirè (S 527), a Type 212 submarine of Marina Militare, commissioned 19 February 2007
- Scirè (Ethiopia), occidental area of Tigray Region
