= IRIS-T =

Medium-range infrared homing missile

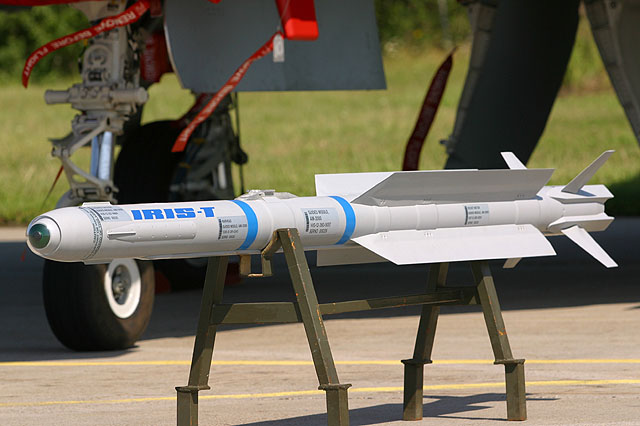
- Mockup of the IRIS-T
- Type: IRIS-T: Short-range air-to-air missile; IRIS-T SL family: Surface-to-air missile; IDAS: Submarine-launched multipurpose surface-to-air missile
- Place of origin: Germany, Italy, Sweden, Greece, Norway, Spain

Service history
- In service: December 2005
- Used by: See operators

Production history
- Manufacturer: Diehl Defence, Avio S.p.A., Litton Italia, Leonardo S.p.A., Saab AB, GPCC, Nammo
- Developed into: Surface-to-air missile: IRIS-T SLS; IRIS-T SLM; IRIS-T SLX; IRIS-T HYDEF; Submarine-to-air missile: IDAS
- Unit cost: €400,000 (~US$473080) for an AAM
- No. built: > 5,000 missiles (as of December 2023)

Specifications
- Mass: 87.4 kg (193 lb)
- Length: 2.94 m (9.6 ft)
- Diameter: 127 mm (5.0 in)
- Wingspan: 447 mm (17.6 in)
- Warhead: Dual-layer HE/fragmentation
- Warhead weight: 11.4 kg (25 lb)
- Detonation mechanism: Impact and active radar proximity fuse
- Engine: Solid-fuel rocket with thrust vectoring control
- Propellant: HTPB
- Operational range: 25 km (16 mi)
- Flight altitude: Sea level to 20,000 m (66,000 ft)
- Maximum speed: Mach 3
- Guidance system: Imaging infrared homing
- Steering system: 4 exhaust vanes and 4 tail wings
- Launch platform: Manned aircraft: European aircraft: Eurofighter Typhoon, JAS 39 Gripen, M-346 Master, Panavia Tornado; American aircraft: F-4 Phantom II AUP, F-5M Super Tigris, F-16 Fighting Falcon, F/A-18 Hornet, F-15SA Strike Eagle; Asian aircraft: KAI T-50 Golden Eagle, KAI KF-21 Boramae; Unmanned aircraft: Polaris Raumflugzeuge: Polaris COBRA 600

The IRIS-T (infrared imaging system tail/thrust vector-controlled) is a short range infrared homing air-to-air missile. It is also called AIM-2000. The missile also has other variants, including the surface-to-air-launched IRIS-T SLS and IRIS-T SLM and their derivatives.

The missile was developed in the late 1990s–early 2000s by a German-led program to produce a short to medium range infrared homing air-to-air missile to replace the AIM-9 Sidewinder in use by some NATO member countries at the time. A goal of the program was to ensure that any aircraft capable of firing the Sidewinder could also launch the IRIS-T. The air-to-air variant was fielded in 2005.

== History ==
=== Background ===
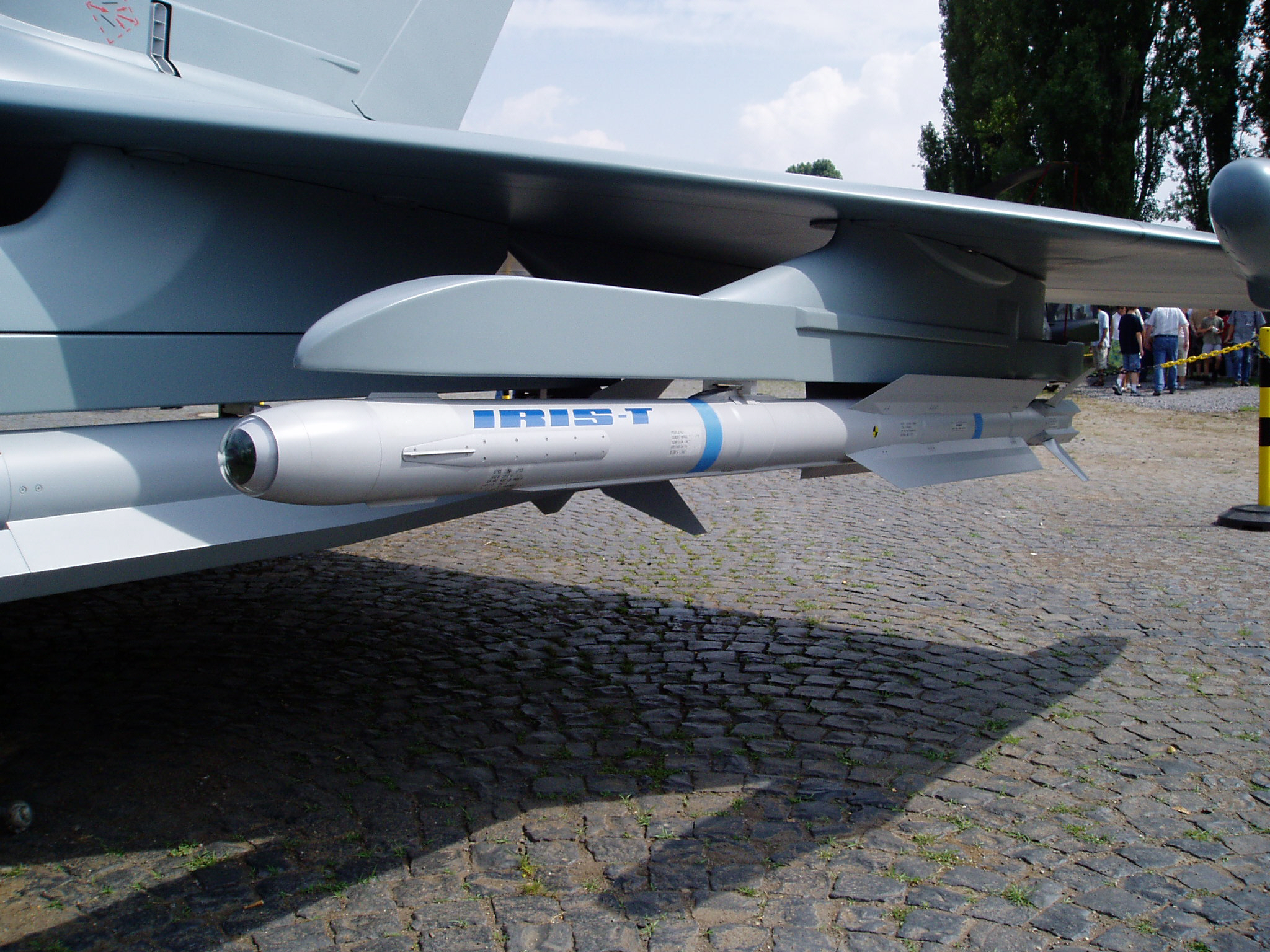
An IRIS-T air-to-air missile of the German Air Force

In August 1980, the USA, the UK, Germany and France signed a Memorandum of understanding which aimed to develop two types of AAMs to replace existing ones. The USA developed the Advanced Medium-Range Air-to-Air Missile (AMRAAM) to replace the AIM-7 Sparrow, while the Europe team developed the Advanced Short-Range Air-to-Air Missile (ASRAAM) to replace the AIM-9 Sidewinder. This work was later revived for the UK–German effort, with the Germans providing a new seeker, and the UK providing most of the remaining components.

In 1987, after years of silence on the program, the US proposed a requirement that the weapon must use Sidewinder rails rather than the universal aircraft rail adaptor named the "missile support unit" that had been developed. This delayed the project by one year as the British, German and Norwegian proposals were redesigned. Fearing erosion of its industrial base, the US proposed it would choose the latest version of its existing Sidewinder design with increased manoeuvrability and IRCCM unless the European partners increased the US industrial workshare, designated AIM-9X. However, the Sidewinder upgrade proposal failed to interest NATO buyers.

After German reunification in 1990, Germany found itself with large stockpiles of the Soviet Vympel R-73 air-to-air missiles (NATO reporting name: AA-11 Archer) carried by the MiG-29 Fulcrum and concluded that its capabilities had been noticeably underestimated. It was one of the earliest 4th generation WVRAAM and more capable in dogfight than the former 3rd generation ones. In 1990, Germany withdrew from the ASRAAM project, while the UK resolved to find another seeker and develop ASRAAM according to the original range requirement. In 1992, the missile development programme ultimately separated with the UK the ASRAAM, France the MBDA MICA, US the AIM-9X and Germany electing to restart development on what became the IRIS-T.

=== Development ===
In 1995, Germany announced the start of the IRIS-T development, in collaboration with Greece, Italy, Norway, Sweden and Canada. In 1997, Germany had invested more than 500 million DM in this project and held a 46% share. In addition, Italy accounted for 20%, Sweden 18%, Greece 8%, Canada 4% and Norway 3%. Canada later dropped out, while Spain joined as a procurement partner in 2003. The German Air Force took first delivery of the missile in December 2005.

== Missile characteristics ==
In comparison to the AIM-9M Sidewinder, the IRIS-T has higher ECM resistance and flare suppression. Improvements in target discrimination allow for five to eight times longer head-on firing range than the AIM-9L and three to four times longer target acquiring range than the AIM-9M. Its seeker can receive cues from radar, helmet mounted display, infrared search and track device, missile approach warner and data link. It can engage targets behind the launching aircraft, made possible by extreme close-in agility, allowing turns of 60 g at a rate of 60°/s via thrust vectoring and LOAL capability.

The IRIS-T belongs to 5th generation IR-guided missiles which introduce infrared imaging seeker. Compared to the other 5th generation IR-guided missiles, such as AIM-9X, ASRAAM which use staring array, the IRIS-T uses an InSb two-colour seeker based around a 128x2 linear array and a scanning mirror which builds an image from a row of detector elements and scans rapidly across the target. It would produce a 128x128 size image 80 times per second. Each of the elements has a resolution in milliradians. It was regarded to have good resistance against DIRCM. Bodenseewerk Gerätetechnik GmbH (BGT) claimed that scanning arrays were less susceptible than staring arrays as the former receive the DIRCM energy for fractions of a second whereas the latter receive it continuously.

The IRIS-T is able to intercept fast-moving and miniature targets, such as air-to-air/surface-to-air missiles and air-to-surface/surface-to-surface missiles and rockets, UAV/drones, and cruise missiles. To improve the probability of a direct hit, the missile is equipped with a K_{u} band active radar proximity fuze.

The IRIS-T has the unique ability, in comparison to other similar missiles such as the AIM-9X, to target and shoot down other air-to-air and surface-to-air missiles, thus offering a 360° defence capability. Surface launched variants of the IRIS-T, the IRIS-T SLS and IRIS-T SLM, have enhanced capabilities to destroy aircraft, helicopters, cruise missiles, air-to-surface missiles, anti-ship missiles, anti-radar rockets and large-calibre rockets. They have a high probability of a killing shot against UAVs and other small manoeuvring threats at very-short and medium-range distances.

The Royal Norwegian Air Force (RNoAF) has tested a new air-to-surface capability developed by Diehl BGT Defence for the IRIS-T. A proof of concept test firing to acquire, track, and engage a target representing a small fast attack boat was conducted in Norway in September 2016, where the IRIS-T missile was launched from an RNoAF F-16AM multirole aircraft. For the air-to-surface role, the missile retains the same standard IRIS-T AAM hardware configuration, including the HE warhead and IIR guidance package, with only an updated software insertion required to deliver the additional ground attack capability. This basic air-to-ground capability provides the ability to acquire, track and engage individual ground targets like boats, ships, small buildings and vehicles.

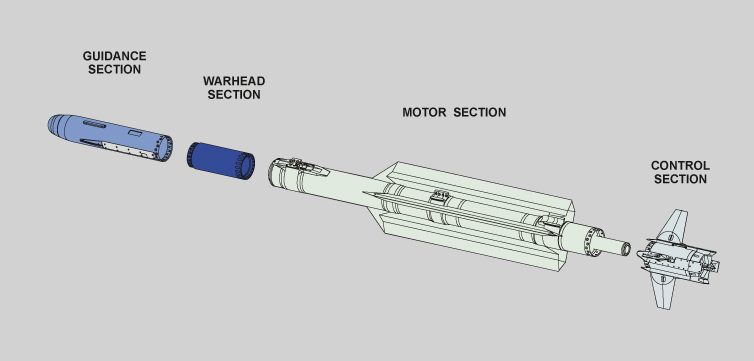
Subassemblies of the IRIS-T

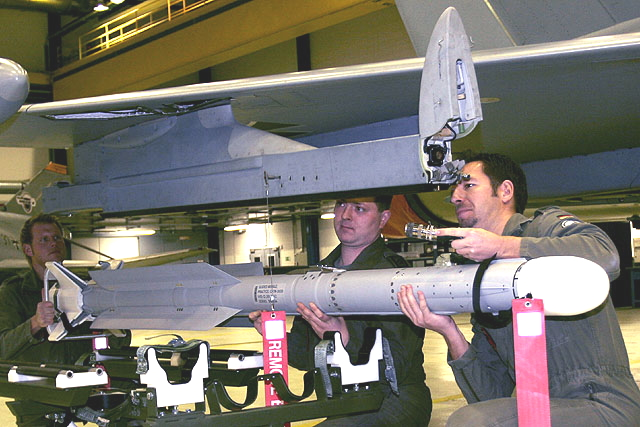
German Air Force airmen mount an IRIS-T to a Eurofighter

Movement of the seeker head

== Variants ==
=== Operational ===
By June 2024, three variants were available: The initial IRIS-T air to air missile with 25 km range, IRIS-T SLS (short range) with 12 km range and 8 km altitude and IRIS-T SLM (medium range) with 40 km range and 20 km maximum altitude. A third variant, IRIS-T SLX (long range) variant with a dual-mode (IR and RF) seeker, a range of 80 km and a maximum altitude of 30 km, is in development as of June 2024.

Due to increased demand due to the Russian invasion of Ukraine, Diehl Defence is increasing production of IRIS-T systems and missiles. It plans to produce ten systems in 2026 and increase production capacity to 16 until 2028, with a missile production of 800 to 1000 for the end of 2025. Diehl has invested 1.5€ billion to expand that production rate to 2000 missiles per year.

==== IRIS-T air-to-air missile ====
It is the initial variant of the IRIS-T missile.

==== IRIS-T surface-to-air missile family ====
IRIS-T SLS and the IRIS-T SLM are the surface-to-air missile variants of the IRIS-T missile.

=== In development ===
==== IRIS-T AAM Block 2 ====
In June 2024, Diehl Defence revealed that they were working on a new variant of IRIS-T AAM which will benefit from a new seeker, replacement electronics and a data link capability.

The German parliament approved its financing in December 2024. The contract was signed in January 2025. In February 2025, Sweden, Italy and Spain also joined the effort to modernise the IRIS-T missile.

==== IRIS-T FCAAM air-to-air missile ====
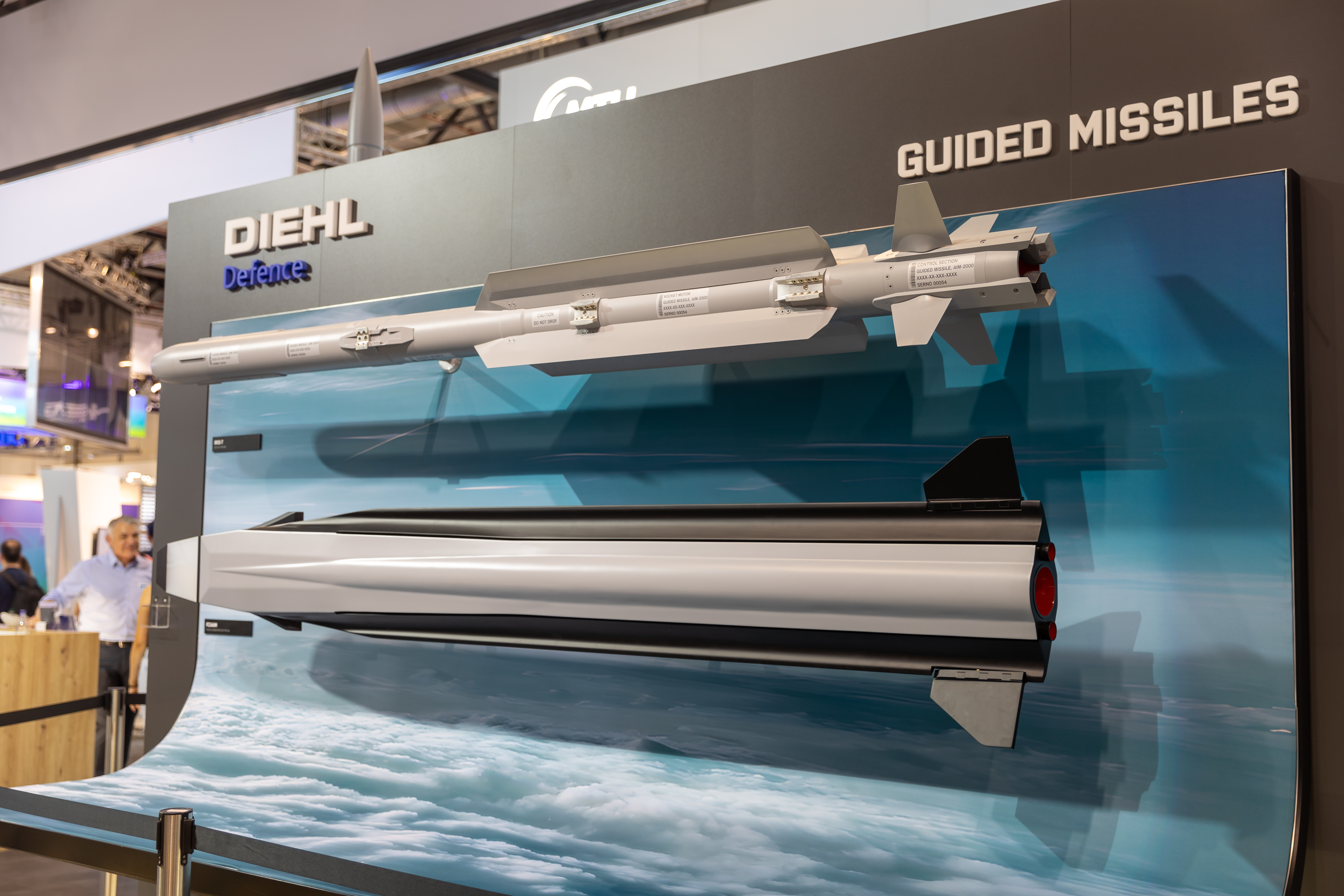
FCAAM

Diehl mentioned in 2022 that it was working on a 6th generation of short-range air-to-air missiles, and it is known as the "Future Combat Air-to-Air Missile". This missile is being designed to become one of the weapons of the European Future Combat Air System. Some new features of IRIS-T FCAAM might include a stealthy non-cylindrical cross-section, multiple-spectrum IR sensor, advanced data processing, a two-way datalink, and a dual pulse/multi-pulse rocket motor.

==== IRIS-T air-to-surface missile ====
For the air-to-surface role, the only difference from air-to-air version is an updated software insertion required to deliver the additional ground attack capability. Tested by the Royal Norwegian Air Force.

==== IDAS (submarine-launched variant) ====
The IDAS (Interactive Defence and Attack System for Submarines) variant is a submarine-launched version of the missile, and is also being developed for the new Type 212A submarine of the German Navy. IDAS is supposed to engage air threats, small or medium surface vessels or near land targets.

The latest stage of development qualification is planned for 2024. In October 2022, the Germany Ministry of Defense revised the budget proposal and canceled the project to buy the IDAS; however in 2024 the project was restarted.

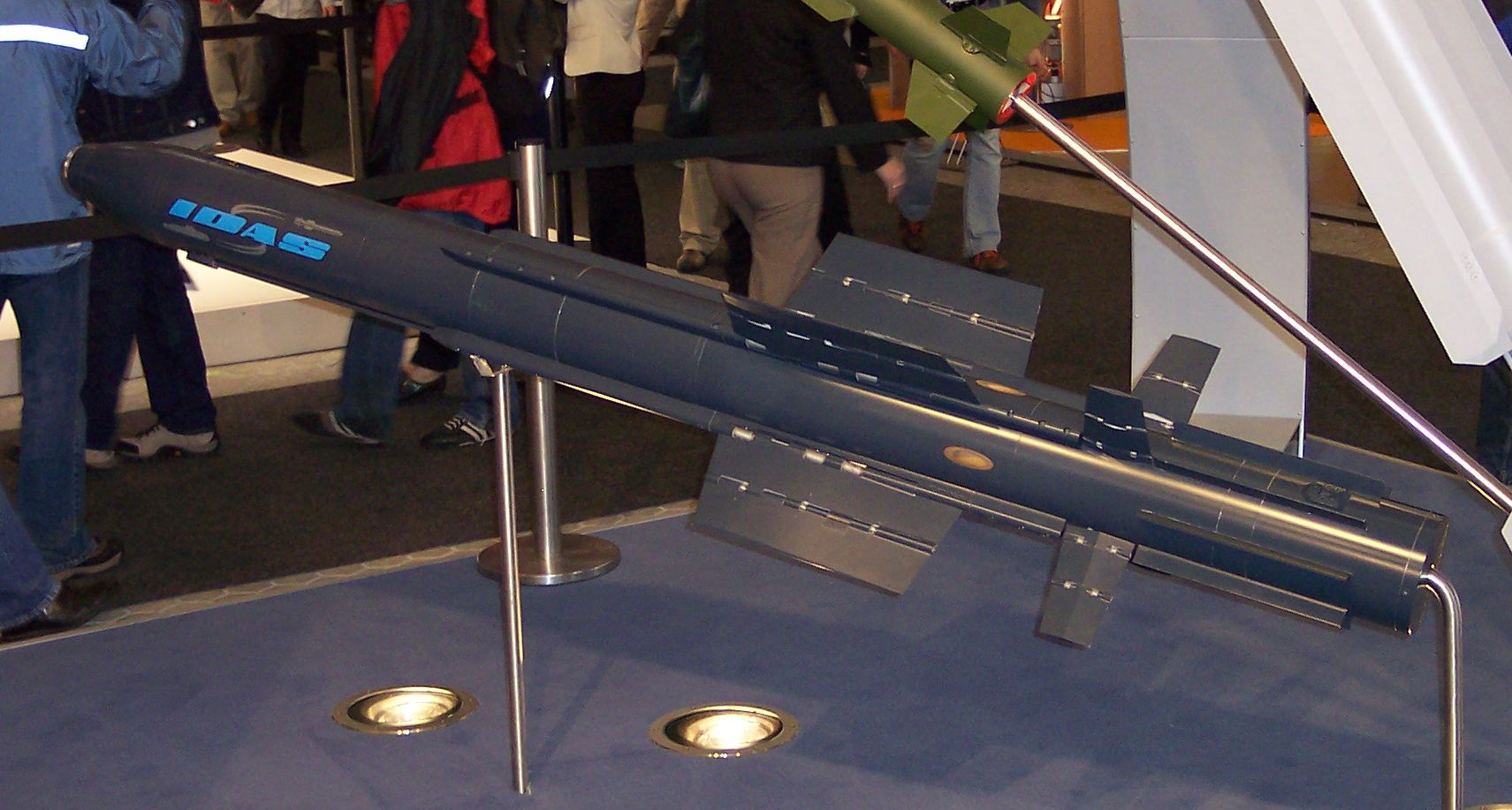
A model of the IDAS

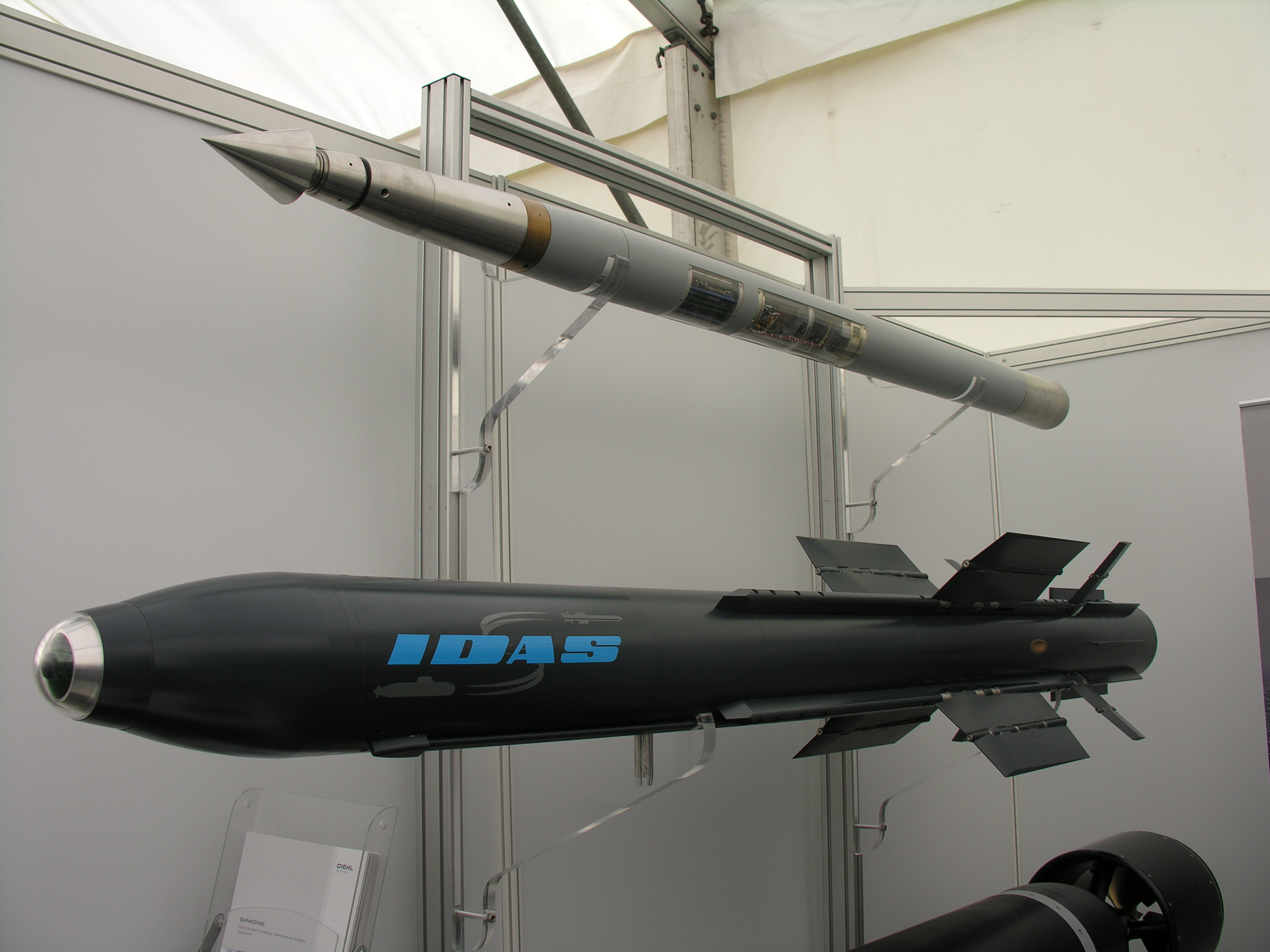
An IDAS and a Barracuda torpedo at the TechDemo'08 Exhibition, 2008

=== Cancelled projects ===
==== LFK NG ====
LFK NG was a surface-to-air variant that was developed by the Diehl BGT Defence and MBDA/LFK for the Germany air defence plan called SysFla (German: System Flugabwehr). Its weight is 28 kg, which is just one third of the original IRIS-T AAM. It would be equipped on the Army's Ozelot air defence system and Eurocopter Tiger. It has the operational range of 10 km. In 2012, the German Army air defence units Heeresflugabwehrtruppe was disbanded. There's no further news about this variant afterward.

== Operators ==
Operators Current Future

The following operators are listed and defined as of June 2023.

=== Current operators ===
Austria
25
Brazil
IRIS-T missiles for the new Saab JAS 39 Gripen E/F variants.
Germany
1,250 missiles in a first order.
In 2023 a framework contract for up to 1,280 missiles was signed to replace those given as aid to Ukraine (120 ordered in a first batch). Flugabwehrraketengruppe 61 at Todendorf received the first IRIS-T SLM fire unit in German national configuration on 13 February 2026, delayed from limited IOC in September 2024 due to ammunition crane certification requirements.
Greece
350 IRIS-T missiles
Italy
444 IRIS-T missiles budget €217m, between 2003 and 2015.
Saudi Arabia
1,400 IRIS-T missiles
150 additional ordered in January 2024 (ordered to replace the ones used to shoot down Houthi drones)
Saudi Arabia qualified the IRIS-T missile on the F-15S in 2026.
South Africa
25 IRIS-T missiles delivered as interim armament for Saab JAS 39 Gripen aircraft until the completion of the A-Darter SRAAM project.
Spain
700 IRIS-T missiles. Original budget €247m, final cost €291m.
Sweden
450 IRIS-T missiles, designated Robot 98 (RB 98). IRIS-T SLS variant used in ground-based air defense systems.
Thailand
220 IRIS-T missiles ordered. To be integrated with F-5T, Gripen C/D, and F-16 eMLU.
Ukraine
In 2022, Germany delivered the first batch of IRIS-T to Ukraine as an aid package, as of 2025 6 systems are confirmed operational with another 12 scheduled for delivery. Ukraine remains the only country to have used these missile systems in combat, citing "excellent results"

=== Former operators ===
Norway
150 IRIS-T missiles. Taken out of service along with the F-16 in 2022. Missiles donated to Ukraine in August 2023.

=== Future operators ===
Hungary
IRIS-T integration for Hungarian Saab JAS 39 Gripen MS20 Block II modernization program was ordered in December 2021.
South Korea
IRIS-T integration for the KF-X fighter program was ordered in 2018. The first test firing took place in April 2023. On 17 May 2024, Diehl Defence declared that a KF-21 fighter had successfully fired an IRIS-T AAM to attack the target drone designated by the onboard AESA radar.

=== Potential operators ===
Romania
Trials are ongoing on the IAR-99SM with the IRIS-T missile.

== See also ==
- A-Darter – (South Africa)
- AAM-5 – (Japan)
- AIM-9X Sidewinder – (United States)
- ASRAAM – (United Kingdom)
- Bozdoğan – (Turkey)
- MICA – (France)
- PL-10 – (China)
- Python 5 – (Israel)
- R-73 – (Soviet Union)

== Sources ==
- Andersson, Martin (2012). Möjliga efterträdare till robotsystem 70 (PhD thesis) (in Swedish). Military Academy Karlberg.
- Friedman, Norman (1997). The Naval Institute Guide to World Naval Weapons Systems, 1997–1998. US Naval Inst. Pr. pp. 422–423. ISBN 9781557502681.
