= Italian submarine Scirè (S 527) =

Todaro-class submarine of the Italian Navy

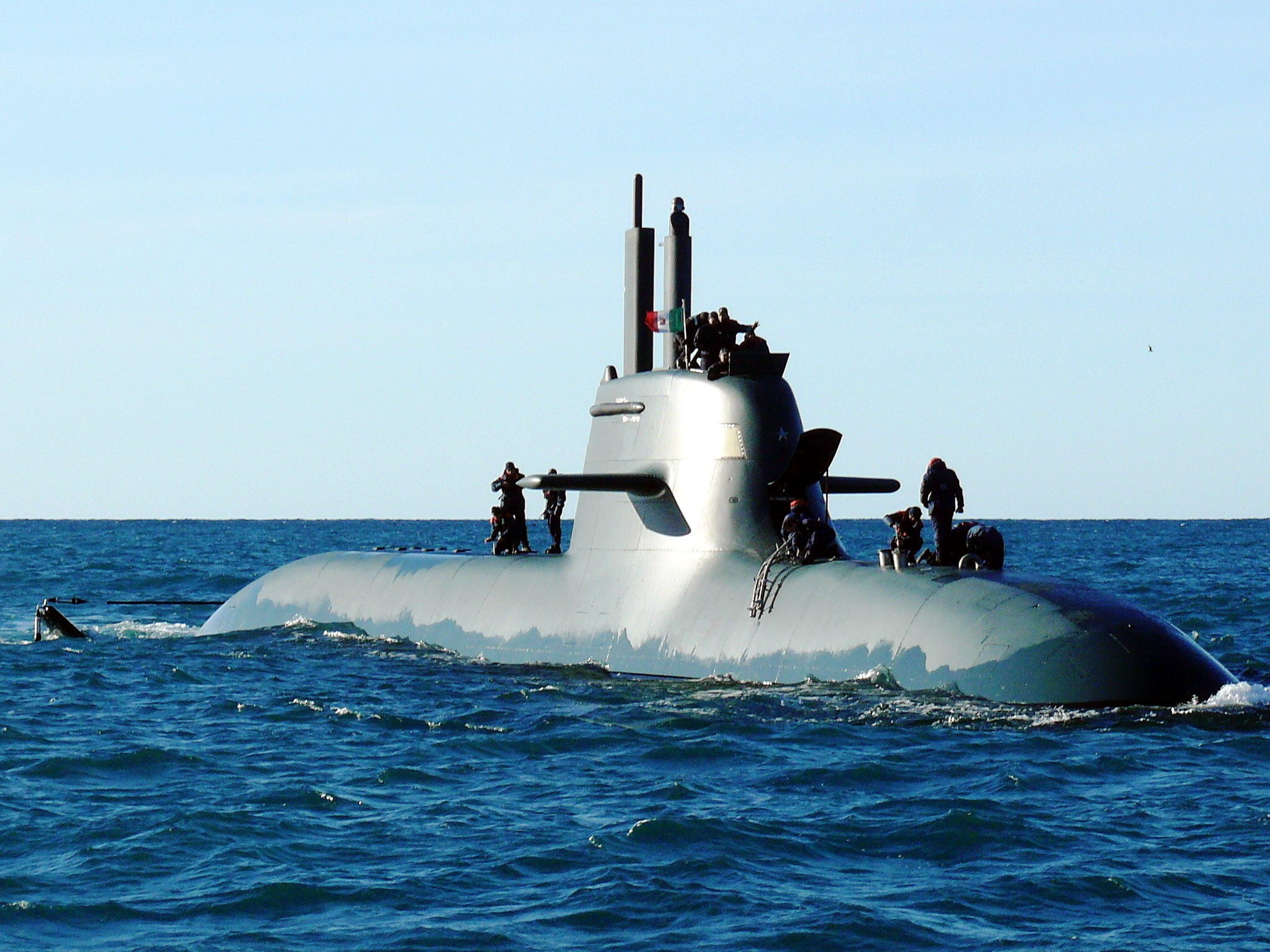
- Scirè underway, 1 December 2009

History

Italy
- Name: Scirè
- Builder: Fincantieri, Muggiano
- Laid down: 27 July 2000
- Launched: 18 December 2004
- Commissioned: 19 February 2007
- Status: in active service, as of 2014

General characteristics
- Class & type: Type 212 submarine
- Displacement: 1,450 tonnes (1,430 long tons) surfaced; 1,830 tonnes (1,800 long tons) submerged
- Length: 57.2 m (188 ft)
- Beam: 7 m (23 ft)
- Draught: 6 m (20 ft)
- Propulsion: 1 × MTU 16V 396 diesel engine; 1 × Siemens Permasyn 1,700 kW (2,280 hp) electric motor; 7-bladed skewback propeller
- Speed: 20 knots (37 km/h; 23 mph) submerged; 12 knots (22 km/h; 14 mph) surfaced
- Range: 8,000 nmi (15,000 km; 9,200 mi) at 8 knots (15 km/h; 9.2 mph) surfaced
- Endurance: 3 weeks without snorkeling, 12 weeks overall
- Test depth: Over 700 m (2,300 ft)
- Complement: 5 officers, 22 men
- Armament: 6 × 533 mm (21.0 in) torpedo tubes

Scirè (S 527) is a Todaro-class submarine of the Italian Navy. The submarine was laid down on 27 July 2000 at the Muggiano shipyard by Fincantieri. Scirè was launched on 18 December 2004 and commissioned on 19 February 2007.

== Namesake ==
Scirè's earlier namesake, the submarine Scirè, was launched in 1938 and served during the Second World War. She participated in some of the operations of the Decima Flottiglia MAS, including the raid on Alexandria in 1941 using human torpedoes, before her loss in 1942.

== Service ==
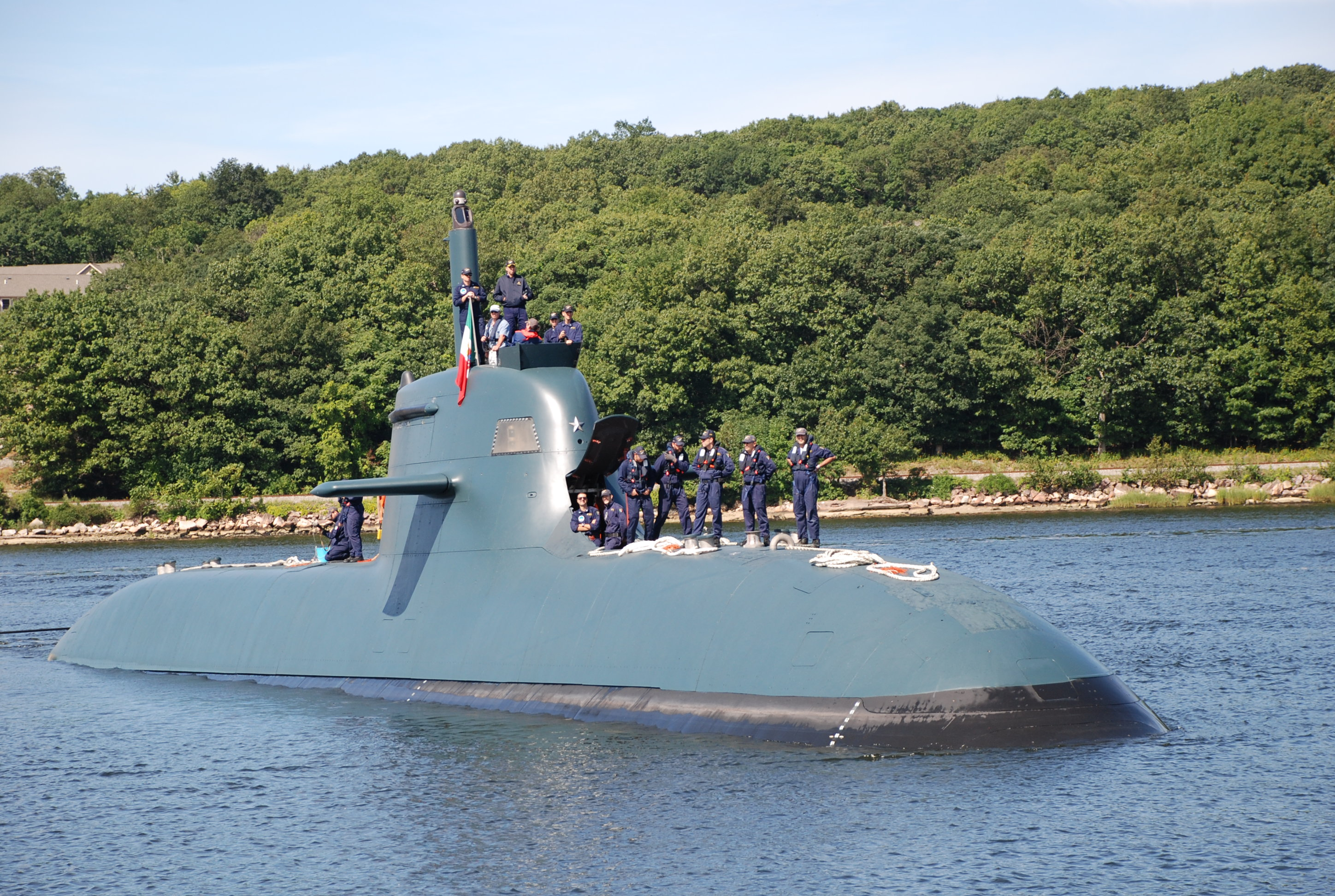
Scirè arrives in Connecticut, on 27 August 2009

Scirè spent over five months deployed to the U.S. in 2009, participating in the CONUS 2009 exercise with the United States Navy.
