= Type 212A submarine =

Class of diesel-electric submarine

- 212A-class profile

Class overview
- Name: Type 212A
- Builders: Howaldtswerke-Deutsche Werft GmbH (HDW), Fincantieri SpA
- Operators: German Navy; Italian Navy
- Preceded by: Type 206 submarine (Germany); Sauro class submarine (Italy)
- Subclasses: Type 212CD; U212 NFS
- Cost: €280−560M
- Built: 1998-2017
- In commission: 2005–present
- Planned: 10
- Completed: 10
- Active: 10

General characteristics
- Type: Attack submarine
- Displacement: 1,524 t (1,500 long tons) surfaced; 1,830 t (1,800 long tons) submerged
- Length: 56 m (183 ft 9 in); 57.20 m (187 ft 8 in) (2nd batch)
- Beam: 6.80 m (22 ft 4 in)
- Draught: 6.40 m (21 ft 0 in)
- Decks: 2
- Propulsion: Diesel-electric / AIP: Diesel engine: 1 × MTU-396 16V 2,150 kW (2,880 hp); Generator: 1 × Piller Group 3,120 kW (4,180 hp); Fuel cells AIP; 9 × SiNavyCIS PEM BZM 34 (HDW-Siemens), PEM, with 34 kW (46 hp) each (U-31); 2 × SiNavyCIS PEM BZM 120 (HDW-Siemens), PEM, with 120 kW (160 hp) each (U-32, U-33, U-34); Lead–acid battery: 216 × EnerSys-Hawker (Hagen) modules with 2 rows; Electric motor: 1 × Siemens FR6439-3900kW Synchronous motor with Permasyn 2,850 kW (3,820 hp); Propeller: 7-blades skewback type
- Speed: Under diesel propulsion: Surfaced: 12 kn (22 km/h; 14 mph); Submerged: 20 kn (37 km/h; 23 mph); Under fuel-cells silent propulsion: Submerged: 8 kn (15 km/h; 9.2 mph) (15 days without surfacing possible)
- Range: 8,000 nmi (15,000 km; 9,200 mi) at 8 kn (15 km/h; 9.2 mph)
- Endurance: 12 weeks overall; 3 weeks without snorkeling
- Test depth: 250 m (820 ft); crush depth over 700 m (2,296 ft)
- Complement: Germany: 28; Italy: 9 officers, 15 sailors, 3 extra-crew possible
- Sensors & processing systems: Systems: Combat management system: Kongsberg MSI-90U (S181-186, S526-527); Kongsberg MSI-90U Mk2 (S528-529); Countermeasure systems: Torpedo countermeasure: TAU 2000 system (STM Atlas Elektronik / ELAC); Sonar suite: STN Atlas Elektronik CSU 90 (DBQS-40FTC); Bow sonar: STN Atlas Elektronik DSQS-21DG (medium frequency, panoramic, active sonar); Passive flank array sonar: STN Atlas Elektronik FAS 3-1; Sonar interceptor: STN Atlas Elektronik AN5039A1; Passive ranging sonar: STN Atlas Elektronik PRS 3-15; MOAS: STN Atlas Elektronik FMS-52 (MOA 3070) (active); Towed array sonar: STN Atlas Elektronik TAS 83 / DTA 50 (passive, low frequency); Periscopes: Batch 1 (S181-184 / S526-527): Zeiss Optronik SERO 14 observation periscope (EO / FLIR / optical rangefinder / ESM / GPS); Zeiss Optronik SERO 15 attack periscope (EO / IR / laser rangefinder); Batch 2 (S185-186 / S528-529); Hensoldt OMS 100 observation periscope (high resolution thermal imager, HD camera); Hensoldt SERO 400 attack periscope (optronic mast system, laser rangefinder); Other sensors: WASS hydrophones; Communication systems: Batch 1: Mast buoy: Gabler Maschinenbau Callisto (UHF / VHF / GPS navigation); Batch 2: Data link: Kongsberg TADAS-ML U212A (Link 11 / Link 16) on the second batch (Italy / Germany); Mast buoy: Gabler Maschinenbau Callisto B (UHF / VHF / GPS navigation); Navigation: Navigation radar: Batch 1: Kelvin Hughes Type 1007 (I-band); Batch 2: Kelvin Hughes Type 2007; Avio GAUDI autopilot
- Electronic warfare & decoys: EloUM: ELINT and ESM: FL1800U suite (EADS Systems & Defence Electronics / Thales Defence Ltd)
- Armament: Torpedoes: 6 × 533 mm (21 in) torpedo tubes (in 2 forward pointing groups of 3) with 13; Germany heavyweight torpedo: DM2A4 Seehecht (Atlas Elektronik); Italy heavyweight torpedo: Black Shark (WASS), or; A.184 Mod.3 (Whitehead SpA); Decoys: Anti-torpedo decoy: C303/S launching system (with 40 × jammers / decoys); Other weapons: Naval mines: 24 held externally; Air-defence missile: IDAS (in development)
- Notes: Steel: non-magnetic austenitic stainless steel (supplied by Thyssen Krupp); Snorkeling system: Riva Calzoni periscope; Batch 2, diver lock added for special forces transfer

The Type 212A is a class of diesel-electric attack submarine developed by Howaldtswerke-Deutsche Werft AG (HDW) for the German Navy (German: U-Boot-Klasse 212 A), and the Italian Navy where it is known as the Todaro class. It features diesel propulsion and an additional air-independent propulsion (AIP) system using proton-exchange membrane (PEM) compressed hydrogen fuel cells from Siemens Energy. The submarines can operate at high speed on diesel power or switch to the AIP system for silent slow cruising, staying submerged for up to three weeks with little exhaust heat.

The Type 212 is the first fuel cell propulsion system equipped submarine series.

== Development ==
At the beginning of the 1990s the German Navy was seeking a replacement for the Type 206 submarines. Initial study started on a Type 209 improved design, with AIP capability, called Type 212.

The final programme started in 1994 as the navies of Germany and Italy began working together to design a new conventional submarine, respectively to operate in the shallow and confined waters of the Baltic Sea and in the deeper waters of the Mediterranean Sea. The two different requirements were mixed into a common one and, because of significant updates to the design, the designation has been changed to Type 212A since then.

On 22 April 1996 a Memorandum of Understanding gave the start to the cooperation for building four vessels for the German Navy and four vessels for the Italian Navy. Its main aim was the construction of identical boats and the start of a collaboration in logistic and life-cycle support for the two navies.

The German government placed an initial order of four Type 212A submarines in 1998. The German Submarine Consortium built them at the shipyards of HDW and Thyssen Nordseewerke GmbH (TNSW) of Emden. Different sections of the submarines were constructed at both sites at the same time and then half of them were shipped to the respective other yard so that both HDW and Thyssen Nordseewerke assembled two complete submarines each.

In the same year the Italian government placed an order of two U212A submarines built by Fincantieri for the Italian Navy (Italian: Marina Militare) at Muggiano shipyard, designated as the Todaro class.

The German Navy ordered two additional, improved submarines in 2006, to be delivered from 2012 on, 1.2 metres (3 ft 11 in) longer to give additional space for a new reconnaissance mast.

On 21 April 2008 the Italian Navy ordered the optional second batch of submarine, in the same configuration of the original ones. Some upgrading should involve materials and components of commercial derivation, as well as the software package of the CMS. The intention is to keep the same configuration of the first series and reduce maintenance costs.

The export-oriented Type 214 submarine succeeds the Type 209 submarine and shares certain features with the Type 212A, such as the AIP fuel cell propulsion.

Poland announced in December 2013 they would lease, rather than buy, two U212-A's, on account of not meeting "requirements of tactical and technical equipment developed by the military, including in particular the propulsion system, missile weapons and rescue system".

On 22 December 2015 Admiral Giuseppe De Giorgi, Commander in Chief of the Italian Navy, announced plans to build another two U212A submarines. In December 2022, an amended contract was signed for production of a third NFS Submarine based on the design of the previous two submarines. The third submarine (NFS 3) is planned to be delivered at the end of 2030, while a contract for the fourth boat was anticipated in 2023.

In October 2016, during the celebration of the commissioning of U-36, the German Navy announced the intent to procure another batch of two U212As within the next decade.

=== Type 212CD ===
In February 2017, it was announced that the Royal Norwegian Navy would procure four submarines based on the Type 212. Initial plans envisaged service entry between 2025 and 2028, but the Norwegian 2020 Defence Plan later envisaged service entry "around 2030". This "CD" (Common Design) variant of the Type 212 will consist of six submarines, with the German Navy ordering two new boats alongside the four Norwegian vessels. In March 2021 an agreement was reached between Norway and Germany to initiate the acquisition program, pending approval by the Bundestag. The contract for construction of the six boats was signed in July 2021 with delivery of the first boat to the Royal Norwegian Navy anticipated in 2029.

== Design ==
Partly owing to the "X" arrangement of the stern planes, the Type 212 is capable of operating in as little as 17 metres (56 ft) of water. This is a long-standing requirement for German submarine designs, enabling them to pass a strategic point in the Baltic Sea (the Kadetrinne) submerged. This allows it to come closer to shore than most contemporary submarines. Commandos operating from the boat can surface close to the beach and execute their mission more quickly and with less effort.

The prismatic hull cross-section and smoothly faired transitions from the hull to the sail improve the boat's stealth characteristics.

=== Air-independent propulsion ===
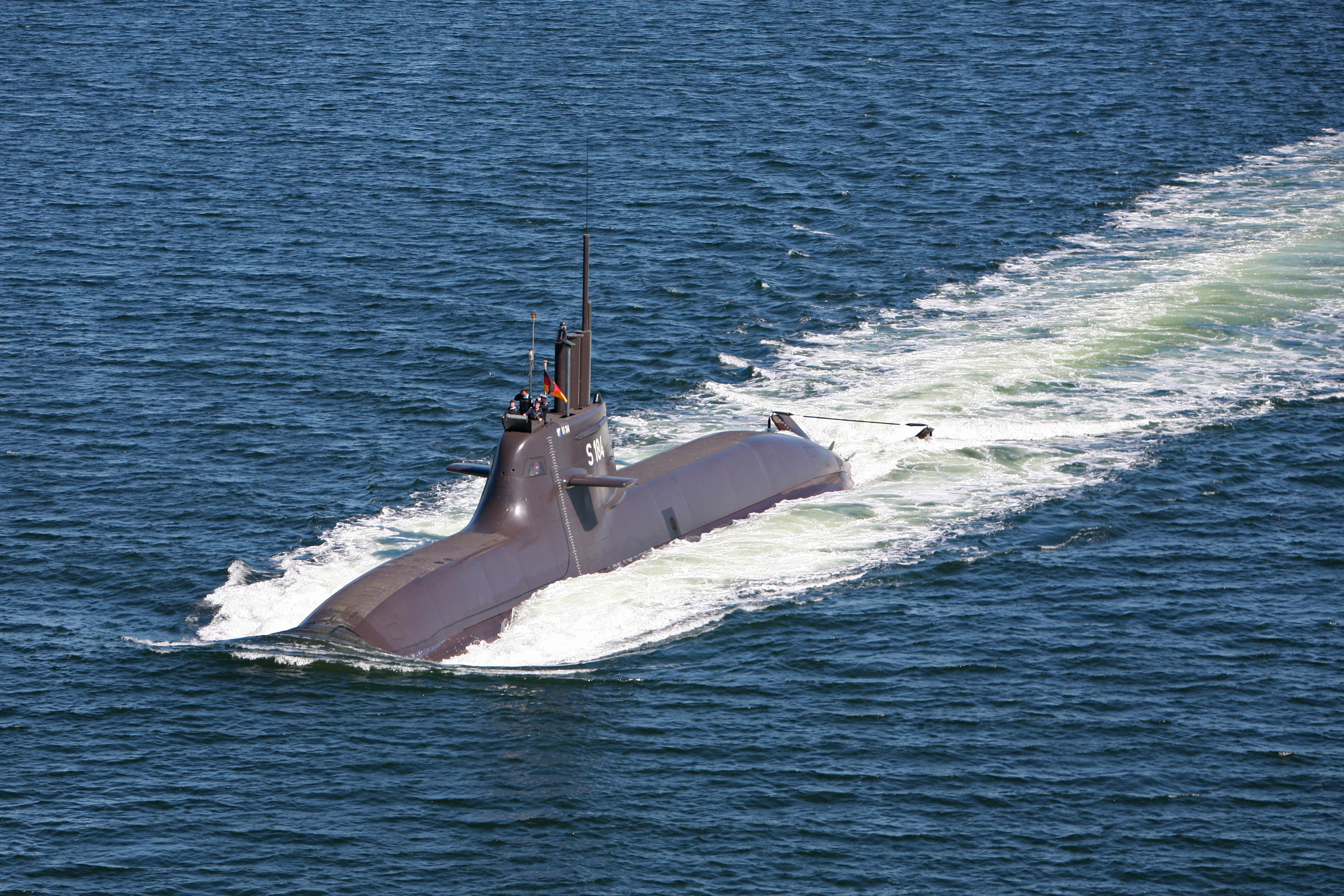
U34 underway

Although hydrogen-oxygen propulsion had been considered for submarines as early as World War I, the concept was not very successful until recently due to fire and explosion concerns. In the Type 212 this has been countered by storing the fuel and oxidizer in tanks outside the crew space, between the pressure hull and outer light hull. The gases are piped through the pressure hull to the fuel cells as needed to generate electricity, but at any given time there is only a very small amount of gas present in the crew space.

In October 2024 it was reported that a new lithium-ion battery system was developed by Thyssenkrupp Marine Systems, which will be installed and tested on an existing Type 212A submarine.

=== Weapons ===
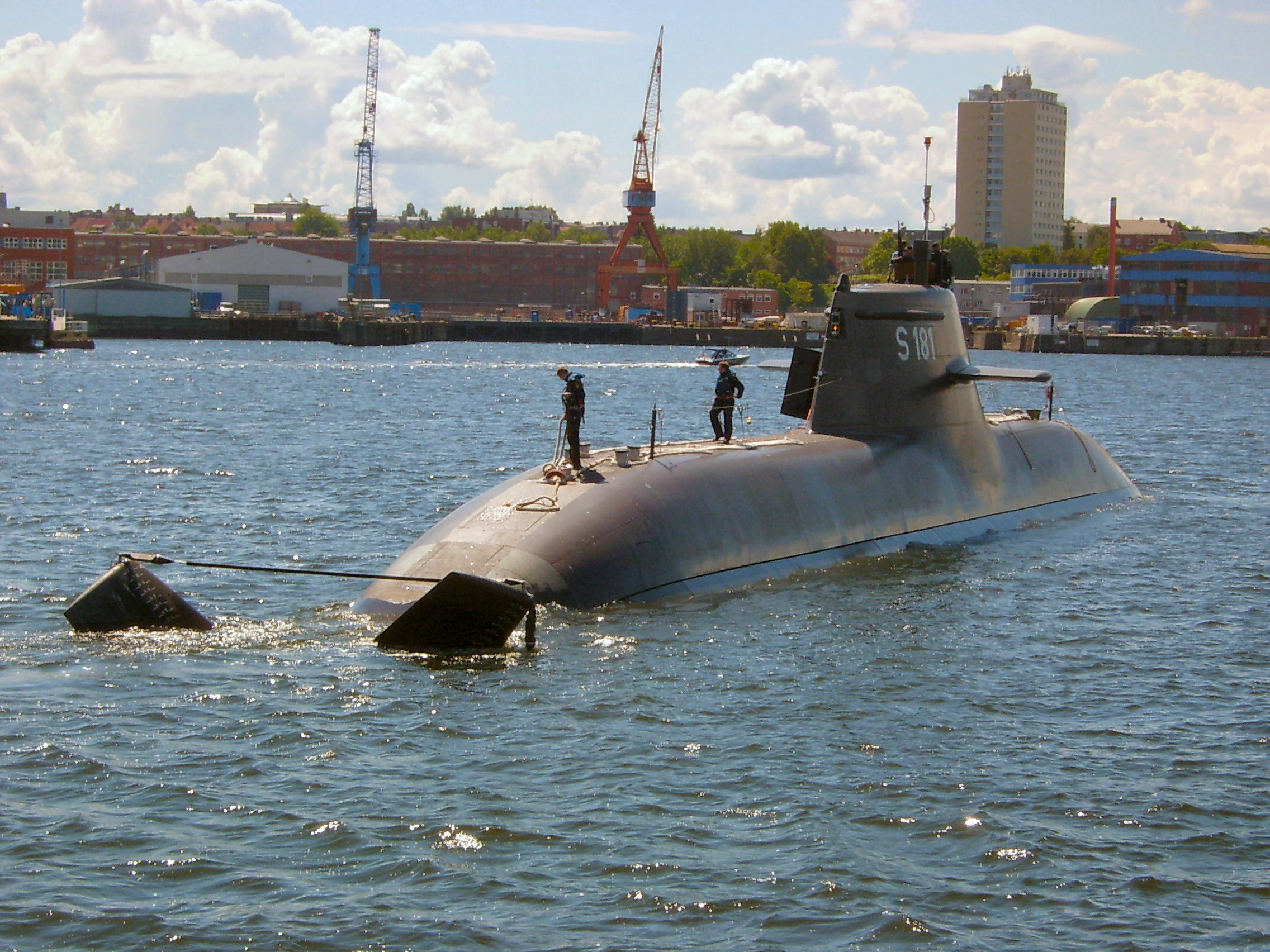
U-31 of the German Navy in Kiel harbor

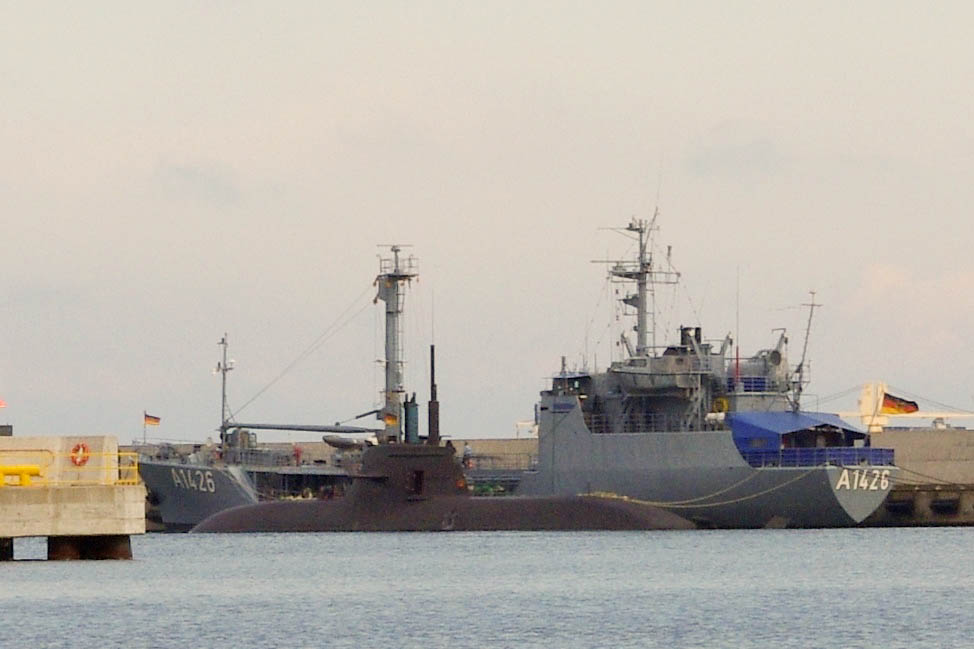
U-33 in Tallinn harbor, Estonia

The Type 212A is capable of launching the fiber optic-guided DM2A4 Seehecht (lit. 'Seahake') heavyweight torpedo, the WASS BlackShark torpedo and short-range missiles from its six torpedo tubes, which use a water ram expulsion system. Future capability may include tube-launched cruise missiles.

The short-range IDAS missile (based on the IRIS-T missile), primarily intended for use against air threats as well as small and medium-sized sea and near-land targets, is currently being developed by Diehl BGT Defence to be fired from Type 212's torpedo tubes. IDAS is fiber-optic guided and has a range of approximately 20 kilometres (12 mi). Four missiles fit in one torpedo tube, stored in a magazine. First deliveries of IDAS for the German Navy were scheduled from 2014 on.

A 30 mm auto-cannon called Muräne (moray) to support diver operations and to give warning shots was being considered presumably sometime before 2014 and possibly still is, as well. The cannon, probably a version of the Rheinmetall RMK30, will be stored in a retractable mast and can be fired without the boat surfacing. The mast will, presumably from 2014 onwards, also be designed to contain three Aladin UAVs for reconnaissance missions. This mast is likely to be mounted on the second batch of Type 212 submarines for the German Navy.

== Operations ==
In April 2006, the German Navy's U-32 sailed from the Baltic Sea to Naval Station Rota in Spain in two weeks, travelling 1,500 nautical miles (2,800 km; 1,700 mi) without surfacing nor snorkelling.

The Italian Navy's S 526 Todaro was deployed, for over six months in 2008, to the United States for the CONUS 2008 exercise with the United States Navy.

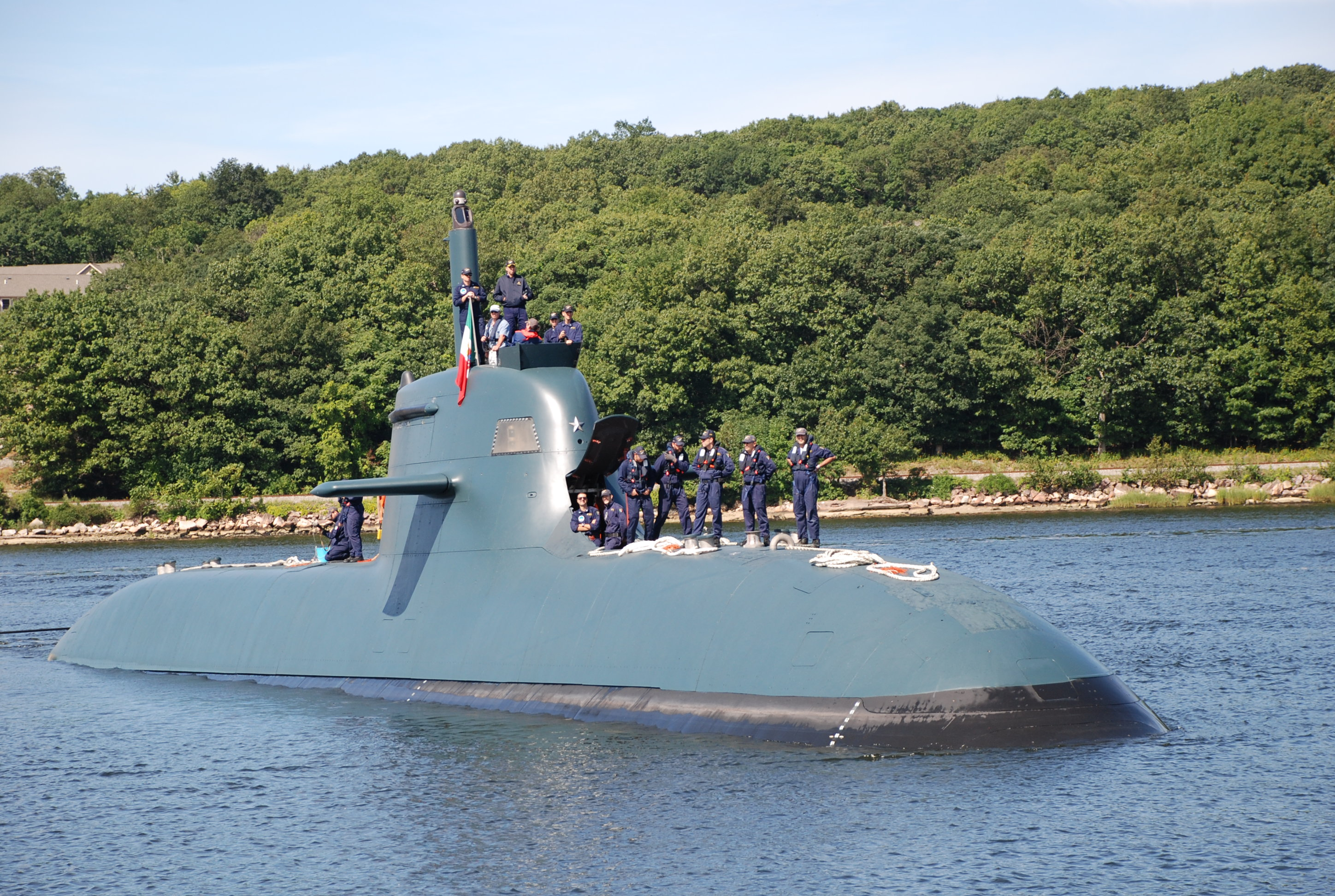
Scirè arrives on a port visit at New London, Connecticut, on 27 August 2009

The Italian Navy's S 527 Scirè was deployed, for over five months in 2009, to the United States for the CONUS 2009 exercise with the US Navy.

Between 1 September 2012 and 13 February 2013, the Italian Navy's S 526 Todaro was deployed to the Gulf of Aden, Arabian Sea, Gulf of Oman and the Indian Ocean for the first time.

In 2013, while on the way to participate in naval exercises in US waters, the German Navy's U-32 established a new record for non-nuclear submarines with 18 days in submerged transit without snorkelling.

On 15 October 2017, the German Navy's U-35 suffered damage to its rudder fins while conducting dives off the Norwegian coast.

== List of boats ==
No.	Name	Builder	Status	Contract	Laid down	Launched	Comm.	Notes
German Navy - 6 in service
S181	U-31	NSWE, Emden (Germany) / HDW, Kiel (Germany)	In service	22 Apr 1996	1 Jul 1998	20 Mar 2002	19 Oct 2005	
S182	U-32	NSWE, Emden (Germany) / HDW, Kiel (Germany)	In service	22 Apr 1996	11 Jul 2000	4 Dec 2003	19 Oct 2005	
S183	U-33	NSWE, Emden (Germany) / HDW, Kiel (Germany)	In service	22 Apr 1996	30 Apr 2001	Sep 2004	13 Jun 2006	
S184	U-34	NSWE, Emden (Germany) / HDW, Kiel (Germany)	In service	22 Apr 1996	Dec 2001	May 2005	3 May 2007	
S185	U-35	HDW, Kiel (Germany)	In service	22 Sep 2006 (ARGE 2. Los 212A)	21 Aug 2007	15 Nov 2011	23 Mar 2015	
S186	U-36	HDW, Kiel (Germany)	In service	22 Sep 2006 (ARGE 2. Los 212A)	19 Aug 2008	6 Feb 2013	10 Oct 2016	
Italian Navy - 4 in service
S526	Salvatore Todaro	Fincantieri, Muggiano shipyard, La Spezia (Italy)	In service	22 Apr 1996	3 Jul 1999	6 Nov 2003	29 Mar 2006	
S527	Scirè	Fincantieri, Muggiano shipyard, La Spezia (Italy)	In service	22 Apr 1996	27 Jul 2000	18 Dec 2004	19 Feb 2007	
S528	Pietro Venuti	Fincantieri, Muggiano shipyard, La Spezia (Italy)	In service	8 Jul 2008	1 Sep 2009	9 Oct 2014	6 Jul 2016	
S529	Romeo Romei	Fincantieri, Muggiano shipyard, La Spezia (Italy)	In service	8 Jul 2008	9 Sep 2010	6 Jul 2015	11 May 2017	

=== Potential operators ===
Colombia expressed its interest for the ship in 2024.

== See also ==
- List of submarine classes in service

Equivalent submarines of the same era

- Dolphin class
- Gotland class
- Lada class
- Scorpène class
- Type 214

== General references ==
- Karr, Hans (2014). Deutsche Uboote seit 1956 (in German). Stuttgart: Motorbuch. ISBN 9783613037083.
