= Leonardo Sistemi di Difesa =

Leonardo Sistemi di Difesa is an Italian defense company which is part of the Leonardo conglomerate. The company specializes in the manufacture of naval weapon systems.

The plant based in Livorno came about when the Whitehead Torpedo Works was purchased by Giuseppe Orlando in 1924, one of the owners of the Cantiere navale fratelli Orlando of Livorno. Whitehead Torpedo established the Società Moto Fides that initially produced motorcycles but changed the production to that of torpedoes.

== History ==
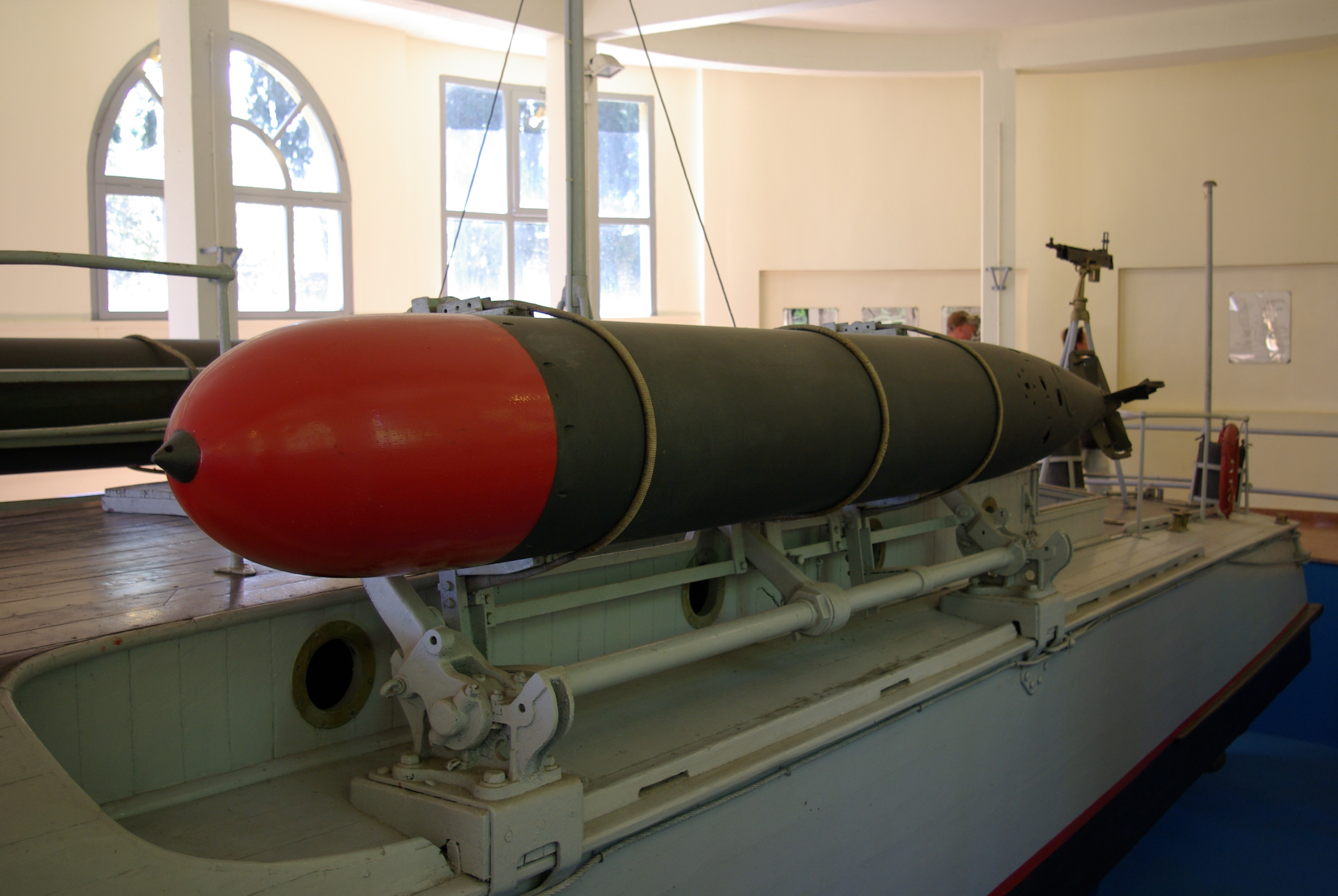
MAS 96 exhibited at Vittoriale degli Italiani, Gardone Riviera. The torpedo shown is likely a Whitehead W110/450 x 5.5.

During the Second World War, Italy possessed three torpedo factories. These were the Silurificio Whitehead located in Fiume, the oldest torpedo factory in the world, founded 1875 as Torpedo-Fabrik von Robert Whitehead and renamed in 1924 after the Italian annexation; Silurificio Italiano located in Baia (present-day Bacoli), near Naples, a Whitehead subsidiary founded 1914 as Società Anonima Italiana Whitehead, renamed 1915; and Silurificio Moto Fides (also known as Silurificio Livorno) located near Livorno - a secondary manufacturing facility of the Whitehead factory, founded 1937. The Moto Fides (variously spelled as Motofides) factory had been originally set up in 1934 in order to manufacture licensed copies of Zündapp motorcycles, and the first delivery of torpedoes at the new production lines took place in 1939. The factory was reorganized as Società Moto Fides in 1941. In 1943, intensive Allied bombing began. The Livorno plant was first bombed on 28 May 1943, with damage being relatively minor and plans already in progress to shift some of the production to infrastructure outside the factory complex, in adjoining areas. The subsequent carpet bombing of 28 June was very severe, laying waste to both parts of the factory complex and the city of Livorno; the civilian death toll and panic among the factory workers rendered further production impossible. Subsequent bombing targeted the Porto Santo Stefano torpedo launching station, which engaged in weapon research and testing. Additional damage was caused by German demolitions crews on 8 September 1943, following the Armistice of Cassibile, with the aim of denying industrial assets to the Allies; all viable machinery, equipment, and research materials were sent to Germany. On 24 September, another heavy aerial bombing took place. All remaining personnel except for some guards abandoned the mostly-ruined factory grounds, with the guards also leaving for Germany some time later. The remains of the factory remained in the hands of vandals and looters for a long time. Allied land forces later used the factory grounds as a field-expedient repair shop for vehicles following the invasion of Italy. At the beginning of 1944, a decentralization plan redirected the threatened personnel and machinery of the Fiume plant to a converted factory, the inactive Cotonificio Veneziano textile plant located in Udine. For a brief time, Udine became referred to as "Fiume Veneto", with the original Fiume being referred to as Fiume Carnaro when necessary to differentiate the two. This process was interrupted by heavy Allied bombing of Fiume Carnaro on January 7th and 21st, causing severe damage to the Silurificio Whitehead plant located there. Working conditions severely deteriorated, both from the bombardments and the heavy German military presence. At the same time, partisan activity was targeting Fiume Veneto. With the advance of Allied troops in northern and central Italy, German forces abandoned both factories, taking much of the tooling and machinery with them, to Germany. On 25 April 1945, the war in Italy ended. The ruined Livorno plant was relinquished to the Whitehead company on 15 October 1945. In the aftermath of the Second World War, all that remained was the Motofides factory, with Silurificio Italiano being utterly destroyed by Allied bombing and the original Whitehead Torpedo Works being physically seized by a foreign power after the occupation of Fiume by Yugoslav resistance forces in 1945.

The Livorno factory was then merged with what remained of the displaced Whitehead factory as Whitehead-Motofides Stabilimenti Meccanici Riuniti S.p.A. Livorno on 31 July 1945. That same year, Whitehead-Motofides became part of the Fiat group and its production was entirely non-military, making various components such as vehicle parts, frames, compressors, outboard engines, and the like. A small group of technicians was dedicated to preservation of the company's original specialty, engaging in the production of spare parts for, repair, and revision of existing torpedoes. Large leftover stockpiles of the German G7e were available, which could be refurbished and kept operable.

In 1950-1951, this group would initiate the first original post-war research into what would eventually become the A182 torpedo, a wire-guided weapon. This began with establishing a working relationship with Atlas Werke, the developers of German acoustic homing seeker heads during the Second World War, and obtaining the P2 (passive two-dimensional) and A2 (active two-dimensional) seeker heads. These only provided guidance in the horizontal plane. These seeker heads were used to experiment with a prototype EA torpedo ("Siluro EA", Elettro Acustico) which was a homing variant of the G7e.

In 1951, according to an initiative of the Italian Navy, a study group (U.S.A.S. – Ufficio Studi Armi Subacquee) was set up, coordinating the activities of Whitehead Moto Fides and Industria Meccanica Napoletana, a company derived from the remnants of Silurificio Italiano. Among the first products was a modernized variant of the Second World War era G7e torpedo, which would be produced until at least 1973. The Whitehead G7e was exported to other countries, including Israel, during the 1950s.

In 1955, wire guidance for the G7e was experimented with, inspired by the G7ef "Spinne" torpedo developed near the end of the Second World War. This became the prototype A181 torpedo, equipped with a two-dimensional Atlas Werke P2 seeker head. Due to lackluster performance of lead-acid batteries, the A181 explored the possibility of simplifying the design by omitting batteries altogether, and supplying the torpedo with electrical energy through the 7 km long guidance wire. Control was limited to turning left and right. Because wire reels acted as inductors, the effect had to be cancelled out; the system necessitated the use of two symmetrically-unwinding wire reels, one inside the torpedo and the other on the launching vessel. Current had to be kept low in order to keep wire temperatures down. This was still unsuccessful, with poor reliability due to the wire overheating and melting. The A181 was then followed up by a battery-powered prototype, called A181/2, which incorporated lead-acid batteries standard to the G7e. The guidance wire was re-engineered in cooperation with multiple companies - chiefly Pirelli and Erba Isolanti - to incorporate five extremely thin filaments in a robust mantle; two pairs for impedance-matched left-right and up-down guidance, and a fifth for multiplexed command signals. Speed was 30 knots with an endurance of approximately 7000 meters. The A181/2 existed as a series of prototypes only. Separately, studies also commenced on the feasibility of HTP propulsion for torpedoes.

In 1956, a project commenced to create a functional weapon on the basis of the A181, designated A182. The new design would incorporate an Atlas Werke P3 passive three-dimensional acoustic seeker head and wire guidance. This weapon would see deployment on the new Centauro class frigates. Initial test launches from motor torpedo boats were carried out in 1956-1957, most of which used the older P2 seeker head. In 1958, research continued using the new Centauro frigate. Sources of self-noise were eliminated, including a transition from a pair of contra-rotating screws to a mono screw. Speed was deliberately reduced from 30 knots to 25 knots. Ultimately the target acquisition range would be approximately 500 meters in typical circumstances. A speed of 25 knots was deemed by navy staff as below minimal requirements, resulting in a temporary abandonment of the P3 seeker head; production units used the P2 seeker head, at 30 knots, with the weapon's depth being manually controlled by an operator on board the warship. In this way, it could still be used for ASW, with the torpedo and target submarine being both tracked by sonar. Incremental development of the A182 continued until 1966.

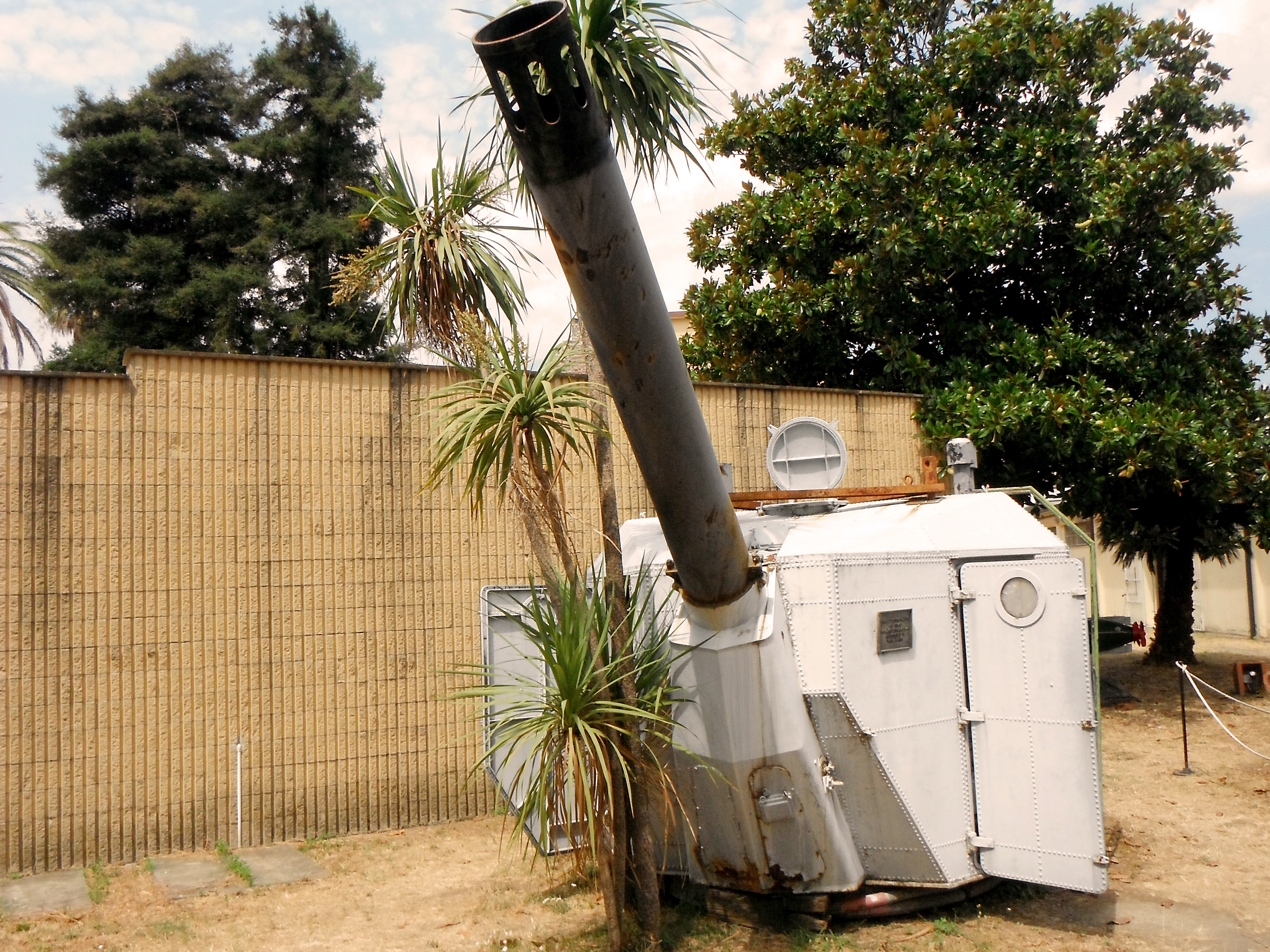
LanciaBAS K113 "Menon", an autoloading depth charge mortar developed by Whitehead, exhibited at Technical Naval Museum at La Spezia.

Beginning in 1960, torpedo manufacturing resumed on an intensive scale. Motivated by the need to arm the upcoming Toti class submarine, Whitehead-Motofides also developed a shortened and improved version of the G7e, called the G6e, following the same naming convention for a six-meter torpedo. The G6e used silver-zinc batteries, greatly improving its endurance; silver-zinc batteries possess 5~6 times the energy density of lead-acid batteries. The initial version used the P2 seeker head and was designed for ASuW. In 1967-1968, three-dimensional acoustic homing was implemented on the G6e, using the P3 seeker head. The G6e was primarily designed as a submarine-launched weapon, though it could also be launched from surface warships possessing 21-inch launch tubes. The same year, development of another improved wire-guided torpedo on the basis of the A181 commenced, on commission with the Italian navy. This weapon was initially a project to add wire guidance to the G6e, but would eventually evolve into the G62ef Canguro.

Also in 1960, the NATO Armaments Committee approved the plan for coproduction of the Mark 44 torpedo by France and Italy. This was followed by the United States congress officially approving French and Italian manufacture of the Mark 44 on 1 June 1961. Whitehead-Motofides, being the only viable manufacturer in Italy at the time, was assigned the task of its production. The first units of the locally-built Mark 44 were delivered in 1962. Although the G6e had substantially greater range than the Mark 44, the American torpedo possessed a more sophisticated seeker head, and production of the G6e was halted after only 24 units were delivered.

The increasing availability of high-speed nuclear submarines exacerbated demand for effective ASW torpedoes. In need of a stopgap solution, the decision was made to use a well-developed existing torpedo, the Mark 44. Being a lightweight torpedo, it lacked operational range in such a role. Additionally, the Mark 44 would operate in a snake search pattern, potentially endangering the launching submarine if launched directly from a torpedo tube. The decision was made to develop a two-stage torpedo, integrating the new G6e to carry the Mark 44. The wire guidance system common to the A182 torpedo was used. The new weapon, called G62ef Canguro (ef = electtrico filoguidato, electric wire-guided), entered service in 1968. In 1971, a staff requirement for a replacement was issued. As of 1974, the A184 torpedo entered service, surpassing both the A182 and the Mark 44. The Mark 44 had already been deemed obsolescent (for example, the Mark 44 was being phased out of USN service after 1967 in favor of the new Mark 46), relegating the G62ef to a secondary role. The G62ef was phased out of service after 1978.

The Whitehead Moto Fides continued the production of torpedoes at a dedicated new factory complex in 1977. It was acquired by the Gilardini Group, owned by Carlo De Benedetti, in 1979. They manufactured 1000 A244 light torpedoes sold to 15 Navies. Another prominent export product was the A184. Circa 1988, the A184 was the only torpedo to pass sea trials for adoption by the United States Navy in connection with the Low-Cost Anti-Surface Warfare Torpedo program, initiated by the Lehman Doctrine.

In 1995 the company ownership passed to Finmeccanica. On 1 January 2016, WASS's activities were merged into the Defence Systems Division of Leonardo S.p.A., as Finmeccanica has been renamed since 2018

On 14 January 2025, Fincantieri completed the acquisition of Leonardo's Underwater Armaments & Systems (UAS) business line, corresponding to the former WASS, and transferred it to the newly established company WASS Submarine Systems S.r.l..

== See also ==
- Alenia Aeronautica
