= Black Shark torpedo =

Black Shark
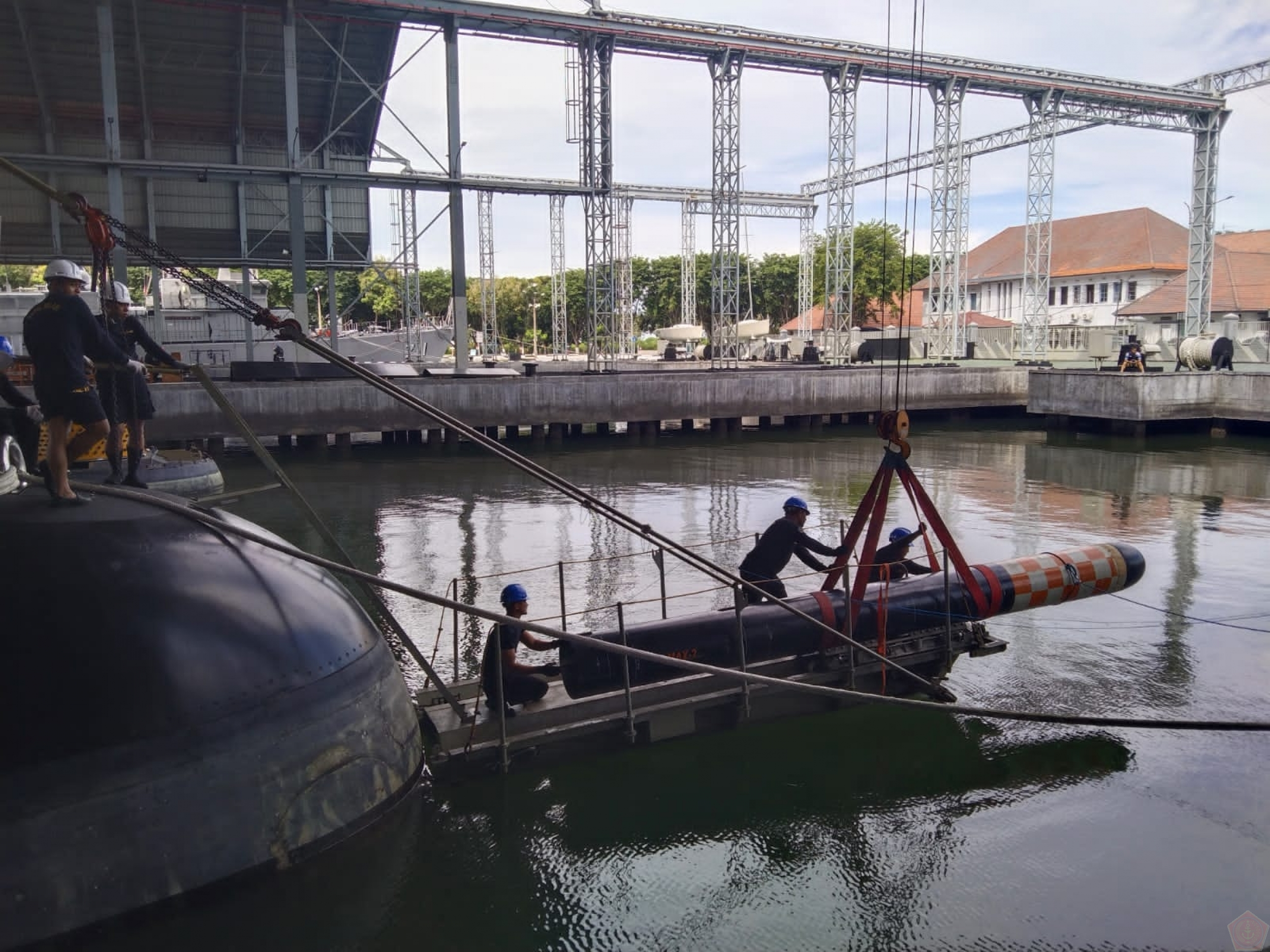
- Indonesian navy submarine KRI Alugoro during a torpedo loading-unloading training exercise, handling a Black Shark heavyweight torpedo.
- Type: Heavyweight dual-purpose ASW and ASuW torpedo
- Place of origin: Italy

Service history
- In service: BlackShark: 2004–present BlackShark Advanced: 2018-present
- Used by: See operators

Production history
- Designed: BlackShark Advanced: 2010-18
- Manufacturer: WASS Submarine Systems, a subsidiary of Leonardo

Specifications
- Length: 6.3 m (21 ft)
- Diameter: 533 mm (21.0 in)
- Effective firing range: 50 km (27 nmi)
- Warhead: High explosive STANAG 4439 and MURAT-2 compliant
- Warhead weight: 350 kg (770 lb)
- Detonation mechanism: Various
- Engine: Contra-rotating direct-drive brushless motor
- Propellant: BlackShark: Al-AgO battery BlackShark Advanced: lithium-polymer rechargeable battery
- Maximum speed: 50 knots (93 km/h) (unclassified)
- Launch platform: Submarine

The Black Shark is a heavyweight torpedo developed by WASS Submarine Systems of Italy.

== Development ==
WASS (previously Whitehead Alenia Sistemi Subacquei) developed the Black Shark torpedo as an evolution of the A184, with more advanced electronic counter-countermeasures (ECCM) abilities and sonar. The advancements in electric motor design and battery allowed an increase in both range and speed.

== Features ==
The Black Shark torpedo offers fiberoptic wire for increased bandwidth and signal processing ability compared to copper wire-guided torpedo types. The sonar capability include non-doppler shifted target discrimination and multi-frequency capability that features advanced spatial and angular analysis abilities. The design goal for the torpedo was 300% improvement of passive acquisition and 200% active acquisition with its sonar system. The brushless motor design coupled with the aluminum-silver oxide (Al-AgO) battery gives the system a top speed 50+ knots (93+ km/h; 58+ mph), and a range of 50 km (27 nmi; 31 mi), performance envelope. Like all other battery powered HWTs, the battery power system does not suffer the loss of performance of Otto fuel II types at greater depths since there is no exhaust to deal with at greater pressures. The result is a 150% improvement in speed and 200% in torpedo endurance.

== NSP/BSA - Nuovo Siluro Pesante / Black Shark Advanced ==
Meanwhile, in Italy, WASS is developing NSP / BSA (Nuovo Siluro Pesante / Black Shark Advanced), new future torpedo for the Italian Navy as result of government program A/R SMD 1/2010 for development new BSA torpedoes for 87.5 million euros, within 2020:

- On 12 January 2014, first test launch new NSP / BSA (Nuovo Siluro Pesante / Black Shark Advanced) by SSK Scirè
- On 19 June 2014, second test launch new NSP / BSA (Nuovo Siluro Pesante / Black Shark Advanced) by SSK Scirè

BSA will arm Italian Todaro-class submarines, with about 80 torpedoes expected.

NSP/BSA - Nuovo Siluro Pesante / Black Shark Advanced will be on board new Italian

== Operators ==
=== Current operators ===
Chilean Navy
100 torpedoes were ordered in 2003.
It is used with conventional attack submarines:
- 2 O'Higgins class submarine (based on the Scorpène class)
- 2 Thompson class submarines (based on the Type 209/1400s)
Ecuadorian Navy
16 torpedoes ordered in 2012 for €24.6 million.
It is used with conventional attack submarines:
- 2 Shiri class submarines (based on the Type 209/1300)
Indonesian Navy
29 torpedoes ordered in 2019.
It is used with conventional attack submarines:
- 3 Nagapasa class submarines (based on the Jang Bogo class)
Italian Navy
About 80 torpedoes (BSA - Black Shark Advanced) were ordered for the navy.
It is being used with the conventional attack submarines:
- 4 Todaro class submarines (U212A)
The Italian Navy is also planning to use the torpedoes with future ships:
- 4 U212 NFS class (submarines ordered)
- 2 U212 NFS EVO class (submarines planned to be ordered)
Royal Malaysian Navy
30 torpedoes ordered in 2003 for €90 million.
It is used with conventional attack submarines:
- 2 Scorpène class submarines (KD Tunku Abdul Rahman and the KD Tun Abdul Razak)
Portuguese Navy
24 torpedoes ordered in 2005 for €47 million.
It is used with conventional attack submarines:
- 2 Tridente class submarines (based on the Type 214)
Republic of Singapore Navy
50 torpedoes ordered in 2012.
It is used with conventional attack submarines:
- 2 Archer class submarines (originally the Västergötland class)
They are rumoured to be upgraded to the Black Shark Advanced standard, and to be used with the:
- 4 (+ 2 ordered) Invincible class submarines (based on the Type 218)

=== Future operators ===
Indian Navy
48 torpedoes ordered in 2025, deliveries planned for 2028-30.
It will be used with conventional attack submarines:
- 6 Kalvari class submarines (based on the Scorpène class)

=== Potential sales ===
Indonesian Navy
The Indonesian Navy ordered 6 DRASS compact submarines. They are equipped of 2 bow-mounted torpedo launchers, and can have 2 externally mounted launchers.
The Indonesia Navy also ordered 2 Scorpene Evolved class submarines. The Scorpène is already qualified with this torpedo, and Indonesia might make a follow-up order.

== See also ==
- DM2A4 Seehecht - German torpedo
- F21 French torpedo
- Mark 48 - US torpedo
- Spearfish - British torpedo
- Varunastra - Indian torpedo
- Yu-6 - Chinese torpedo
- A184 - previous Italian heavy torpedo
