= IDAS (missile) =

Submarine-launched surface-to-air missile

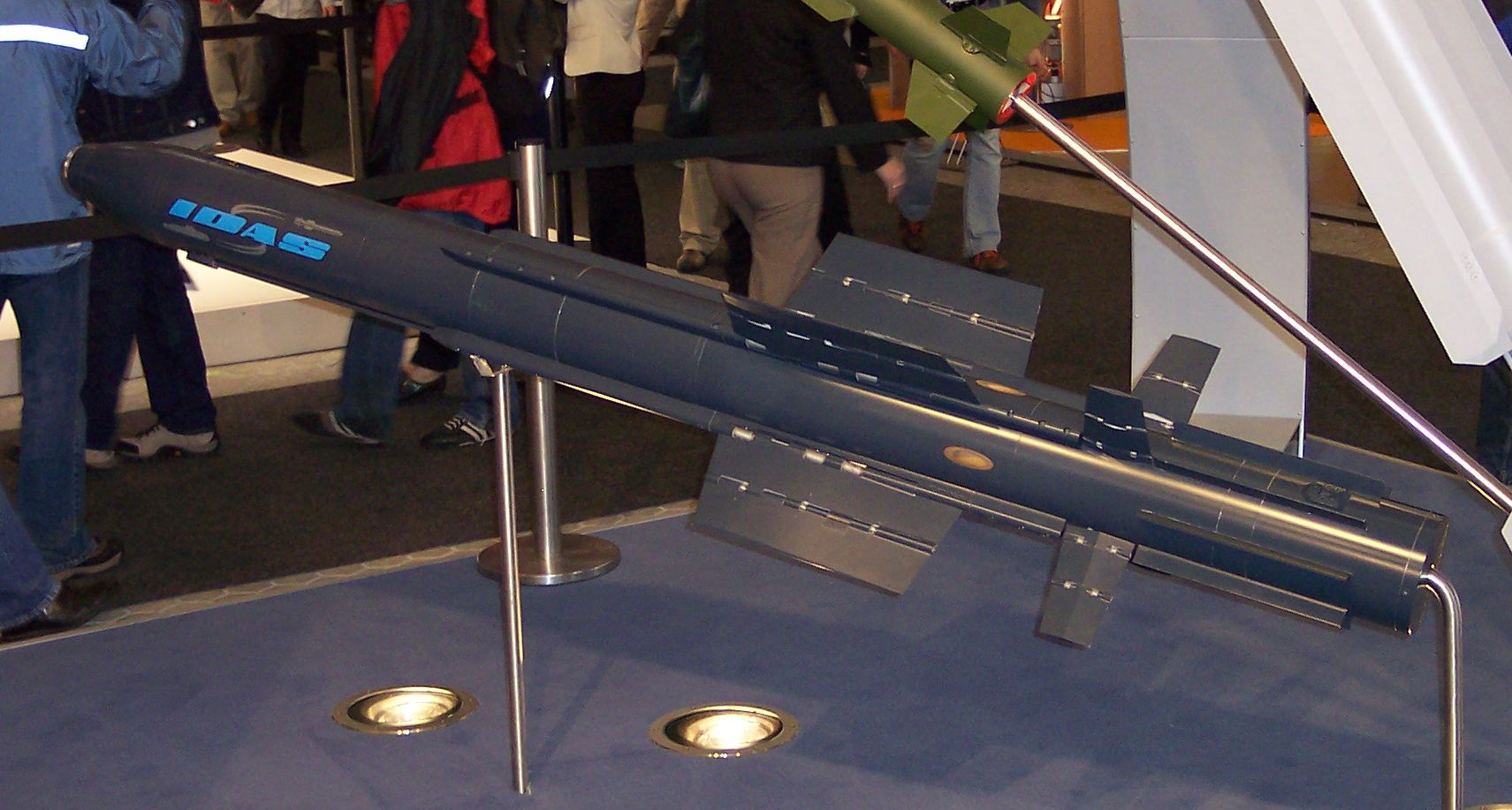
- Model of IDAS at the ILA 2006
- Type: Submarine-launched surface-to-air missile (secondary role anti-ship missile and land-attack missile)
- Place of origin: Germany / Norway / Turkey

Production history
- Designer: Diehl Defence, HDW, Kongsberg, Nammo, ROKETSAN

Specifications
- Length: 2,800 mm (110 in)
- Diameter: 180 mm (7.1 in)
- Warhead: HE/Fragmentation
- Engine: Solid-fuel rocket
- Operational range: ~40 km (25 mi)
- Maximum speed: 240 m/s (540 mph)
- Guidance system: Imaging infrared

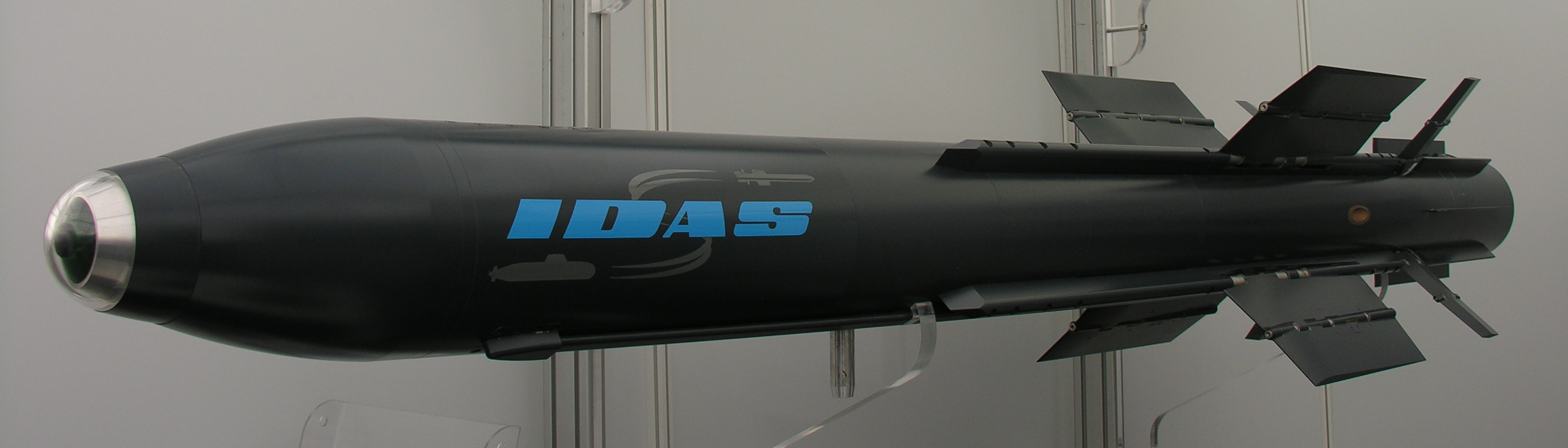
IDAS on the TechDemo'08 Exhibition, 2008

IDAS (Interactive Defence and Attack System for Submarines) is a medium-range missile currently being developed for the Type 209 and Type 212A submarine class of the German Navy.

IDAS technology is based on the IRIS-T air-to-air missile which primarily targets aerial threats, such as ASW helicopters, but also against small or medium-sized surface vessels or coastal land targets. It is currently being developed by Diehl Defence and HDW, which is a part of Thyssenkrupp Marine Systems (TKMS), to be fired from Type 212's torpedo tubes. IDAS use imaging infrared guidance with a fiber optic link to the boat and officially has a range of approximately 20 km. Four missiles will fit in one torpedo tube, stored in a magazine. First deliveries of IDAS for the German Navy and operational service were initially planned from 2014 on. Actual orders were placed in 2025 by the German Navy .

Except for a few years of testing by the Royal Navy and Israeli Navy of the short range TV guided Blowpipe missile in the 1970s, the IDAS system is the world's first missile which gives submarines the capability to engage air threats whilst submerged, and the first tube-launched missile that does not emerge in a capsule, but is fired directly from the torpedo tubes.

Alternatively, IDAS could be in theory fired from the Gabler Maschinenbau TRIPLE-M mast system, but, at least in the new Type 216 submarine currently under development, IDAS will be fired as normal from the torpedo tubes, while the Muraena will be the primary weapons option for its TRIPLE-M system.

In May 2013, the Turkish company ROKETSAN and the German IDAS Consortium formed by Thyssenkrupp Marine Systems and Diehl BGT Defence signed a cooperation agreement to develop and supply the submarine-launched IDAS missile

== Operators ==
=== Future operators ===
Germany
Purchase approved by the parliament in December 2024, to equip the Type 212CD.
The order was placed in January 2025.

=== Potential operators ===
Norway
Purchase possible as the Norwegian Navy ordered 6 Type 212CD.
