= A184 torpedo =

A184
- Type: Heavyweight dual-purpose ASW and ASuW torpedo
- Place of origin: Italy

Service history
- In service: 1974-present

Production history
- Manufacturer: Leonardo

Specifications
- Mass: 1,265 kg (2,789 lb)
- Length: 6.0 m (19.7 ft)
- Diameter: 533 mm (21.0 in)
- Warhead: HBX-3
- Warhead weight: 250 kg (550 lb)
- Detonation mechanism: Impact and proximity
- Engine: Contra-rotating direct-drive brushless motor
- Propellant: Silver-zinc battery
- Operational range: 25 km (13 nmi) low-speed, 17 km (9.2 nmi) high-speed
- Maximum depth: 400 m (1,300 ft)
- Maximum speed: 24 kn (44 km/h) low-speed, 38 kn (70 km/h) high-speed
- Launch platform: Surface ships and submarines

The A184 is an Italian heavyweight wire-guided torpedo originally developed by Whitehead SpA. It can be launched from surface vessels and submarines and locates the target using an acoustic seeker. The torpedo body is of a standard 21-inch (533 mm) form factor.

== Description ==
Development began in 1967, with incremental development continuing until 1978. In spring of 1969, the weapon's development was funded by a contract with the Italian Navy. In 1971, an official staff requirement was issued to develop a replacement for the earlier G62ef Canguro, acoustic homing G6e, and Second World War-era straight-running G7e, the latter of which remained in production by Whitehead until the early 1970s. The new torpedo incorporated battery propulsion modern to the time period. The A184 prototype was tested in 1973 and the weapon entered service in 1974. The seeker head of the A184 possesses digital active and passive terminal homing using two semicircular arrays, one in the vertical and one in the horizontal plane. The weapon is wire-guided with active and passive sonar capabilities. Launch can be accomplished both by pneumatic catapult and in swim-out mode, dependent on torpedo tube hardware. When used by surface ships, the A184 is launched from aft-facing torpedo tubes. In 1997, development began on a replacement, initially designated as A184 Enhanced. This new weapon would be deployed in 2004 as the Black Shark, featuring numerous improvements such as a transition to fiberoptic wire guidance and lithium-polymer batteries. As of 2024, the older A184 Mod 3 remains in service with some navies due to its lower cost and remains listed as a product by Leonardo. Users of the A184 include the Italian and Ecuadorian navies as of 2024.

In Italian service, the A184 was used on surface ships such as the Audace class destroyers and Maestrale class frigates, as well as submarines such as the Sauro class.

In the late 1980s, the A184 Mod 1 underwent trials with the United States Navy, in a bid for the low-cost Anti-Surface Warfare Torpedo (ASuWT) program. Whitehead SpA was one of four companies competing for a contract of 2000 torpedoes, with only the A184 successfully reaching the sea trials phase. Although it passed trials, the program did not result in its adoption.

== Operators ==
- Italian Navy - since introduction; used on Todaro and Sauro class submarines, Maestrale class frigates, and others.
- German Navy - used on Type 209, Type 210 and Type 212 submarines; supplied to foreign submarine buyers.
- Peruvian Navy - since 1986
- Republic of China Navy - since 1986; used on the CNS Hai Pao and Hai Lung class submarines
- Chilean Navy
- Indonesian Navy
- Bolivarian Navy of Venezuela
- Ecuadorian Navy

== See also ==
- Black Shark - Italian torpedo, successor to the A184
- Tigerfish torpedo - British torpedo, similar performance
- Spearfish - British torpedo
- Type 80 - Japanese torpedo, similar performance
- NT37 - American torpedo
- Mark 48 - American torpedo
- DM2A4 Seehecht - German torpedo
- F21 - French torpedo
- Varunastra - Indian torpedo
- Yu-6 - Chinese torpedo
