= List of admirals of the German Navy =

The list of admirals of the German Navy consists flag officers of the German Navy. The year-date is related to the promotion to the appropriate admiral's rank.

== Active admirals of the German Navy ==
The medical officers are incorporated into the table in line to the rank.

=== Admirals ===
Rank	Name	Assignment	Start of service
Admiral	Manfred Nielson	Deputy Supreme Allied Commander Transformation	March 24, 2016

=== Vizeadmirals ===
Rank	Name	Assignment	Start of service
Vizeadmiral	Rainer Brinkmann	Deputy Inspekteur der Marine	November 1, 2014
Vizeadmiral	Andreas Krause	Inspekteur der Marine	November 1, 2014
Vizeadmiral	Joachim Rühle	Chief recruitment division, MOD Germany	November 1, 2014

=== Konteradmirals ===
Rank	Name	Assignment	Start of service
Konteradmiral	Thomas Daum	Chief of staff, NATO Communications and Information Agency (NCIA)	November 1, 2015
Konteradmiral	Thomas Jugel	Deputy division chief "Strategy and Operations", MOD Germany	May 1, 2013
Konteradmiral	Thorsten Kähler	Chief of staff, Marinekommando	March 1, 2015
Konteradmiral	Hans-Christian Luther	Division chief "Operations" in the Marinekommando	May 24, 2014
Konteradmiral	Klaus-Michael Nelte	Head of the staff "Organisation and Revision", MOD Germany	May 1, 2013

=== Flottillenadmirals ===
Rank	Name	Assignment	Start of service
Admiralarzt	Stephan Apel	"Admiralarzt of the German Navy", Marinekommando	October 1, 2012
Flottillenadmiral	Michael Busse	Chief division "Command and Control", Kommando Streitkräftebasis	October 1, 2014
Flottillenadmiral	Jürgen Ehle	Chairman EU Military Committee Working Group	June 1, 2013
Flottillenadmiral	Rainer Endres	Division chief "Recruitment, Training and Organisation", Marinekommando	October 1, 2012
Flottillenadmiral	Thomas Ernst	Commander Maritime Air NATO- COMMARAIRNATO, NATO Maritime Command, Northwood/GBR	June 1, 2013
Flottillenadmiral	Markus Krause-Traudes	Deputy chief of staff "Operations", Kommando Operative Führung Eingreifkräfte	May 1, 2012
Flottillenadmiral	Martin Krebs	Branch chief II, Recruitment division, MOD Germany	October 1, 2012
Flottillenadmiral	Frank Martin Lenski	Commander officer Marineunterstützungskommando	October 1, 2014
Flottillenadmiral	Georg Freiherr von Maltzan	Chief sub-division "Operations", Marinekommando	October 1, 2012
Flottillenadmiral	Jürgen Mannhardt	Chief division "Plans and concepts", Marinekommando	October 1, 2012
Flottillenadmiral	Jean Martens	Commander Einsatzflottille 1	May 1, 2013
Flottillenadmiral	Jürgen zur Mühlen	Commander Einsatzflottille 2	January 1, 2013
Flottenarzt	Knut Reuter	Chief physician Bundeswehrkrankenhaus Berlin	December 3, 2014
Flottillenadmiral	Karsten Schneider	Deputy commander and director courses, Führungsakademie der Bundeswehr	October 1, 2012
Flottillenadmiral	Carsten Stawitzki	Commander Marineschule Mürwik	July 1, 2013
