= Rainer Brinkmann (admiral) =

German admiral

- Born: March 3, 1958 (age 68); Warburg, North Rhine-Westphalia, Germany
- Allegiance: Germany
- Branch: German Navy
- Service years: 1976–present
- Rank: Vizeadmiral (vice admiral)
- Commands: S 53 "Pelikan"; 7th Fast Attack Squadron; 1st Flotilla; Deputy Inspector of the Navy
- Awards: Cross of Honour of the Bundeswehr in Gold

Rainer Maria Brinkmann (born 3 March 1958) is a Vizeadmiral of the German Navy, and the current Deputy Inspector of the Navy. He previously served in fast attack craft units, and in staff positions, and has a degree in education from the University of the Bundeswehr Hamburg.

== Military career ==
Brinkmann joined the German Navy as an enlisted member in 1976, serving on the deck crew of ships in the 7th Fast Attack Squadron (7. Schnellbootgeschwader) and the Gorch Fock. In 1977 he decided to pursue a career as an officer, and after a year of officer training entered the University of the Bundeswehr Hamburg in 1978. He studied education, completing his degree in 1981. He then went training as a weapons officer at the 5th Fast Attack Squadron, based in Kappeln. He served with the squadron until 1985, when he was appointed as adjutant of the Schleswig-Holstein Territorial Command, and German liaison officer to Allied Forces Northern Europe.

In 1987–88, Brinkmann completed the "B" course on above-water weapon systems, including field training. He was then appointed to his first command, of a Tiger-class fast attack craft, S 53 "Pelikan" of the 5th Fast Attack Squadron, which he served in from 1988 to 1990. From 1990 to 1992, he was part of the naval staff officers' course at the Führungsakademie der Bundeswehr in Hamburg. He then served as operations officer (S3) and deputy commander of the 2nd Fast Attack Squadron based in Kappeln. Brinkmann served as a personal staff officer at the Federal Ministry of Defence in Bonn, before returning to the 7th Fast Attack Squadron, to serve as its commander from 1997 to 1999, based in Warnemunde.

From 1999 to 2001, Brinkmann was a department head at the Navy Office in Rostock, and from 2001 to 2003 he was a department head at the Personnel Office of the Bundeswehr in Cologne. He then worked at the Federal Ministry of Defence, as the section head for personnel management of admiral officers and full captains from 2003 to 2006, and as section head for operational policy from 2006 to 2007. In 2007–08, he served as chief of staff and deputy commander of the 1st Flotilla (Einsatzflottille 1) based in Kiel. In 2008, he was promoted to flotilla admiral, and took command of the flotilla and the NATO Centre of Excellence for Operations in Confined and Shallow Waters, succeeding from Andreas Krause. From 2010 to 2012, he served as deputy director of a Federal Ministry of Defence department in Bonn, and from 2012 to 2014, he served as deputy commander of the Bundeswehr Operations Command (responsible for Bundeswehr operational missions, including foreign deployments). While in this role, he travelled to Mali to visit German troops participating in EUTM Mali. On 23 October 2014, he took over from Andreas Krause as Deputy Inspector of the Navy, joining Navy Command in Rostock. Shortly thereafter, he was promoted to the rank of Vizeadmiral.
