= Naval Damage Control Training Centre =

German Naval Damage Control Training Centre

Coordinates: 54.09991°N 10.80683°E

- Einsatzausbildungszentrum Schadensabwehr Marine
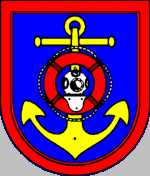
- Insignia of the Einsatzausbildungszentrum Schadensabwehr Marine
- Founded: 1959; 67 years ago
- Country: Germany
- Branch: German Navy
- Type: Naval training establishment
- Part of: German Navy
- Garrison/HQ: Neustadt in Holstein

Commanders
- Kommandeur: Kapitän zur See Eckard Menzel

The Einsatzausbildungszentrum Schadensabwehr Marine (EAZS M) is a naval school of the German Navy in Neustadt in Holstein. It is subordinate to the department head operations in the naval command in Rostock.

== History ==
The naval damage control training center was formed in 1958 and set up in Neustadt in Holstein in 1959 under the name Schiffssicherungslehrgruppe. The first commander was Captain Gerhard Junack, later commanders held the rank of Fregattenkapitän. Up until 2010, all commanders came from a naval engineering.

The training was initially directly subordinate to the Schiffsmaschinenkommando, from 1962 to command of ship technology. In 1965 the subordination for the Inspektion der Schiffstechnik in the Navy Office.

On January 1, 1974, the training centre was subordinated to the Technical Naval School I in Kiel and later renamed the Ausbildungszentrum Schiffssicherung (AZS).

When the submarine training group previously stationed in Neustadt was dissolved, a fourth inspection was set up, which is responsible for submarine rescue training.

On April 1, 2010, the AZS was given an expanded area of responsibility, renamed the Einsatzausbildungszentrum Schadensabwehr Marine. It has since been led by a sea captain of the operational career.

The EAZS also has a support center for civil education and training with the training course for IT specialist system integration via civil education providers.

As part of the realignment of the German Navy, the Operations Training Center for Einsatzausbildungszentrum Schadensabwehr Marine (EAZS M) in Neustadt in Holstein was placed directly under the command of the Navy during a ceremonial inspection on March 26. Since April 1, 2013, the Operations Department Head has been responsible for the fate of the EAZS M at naval command level. The previous technical subordination as a teaching group of the Marinetechnikschule (MTS) in Parow ended after 131/2 years.

The 60th anniversary of the Naval Damage Control Training Center was celebrated on August 23, 2019, in the presence of the Head of Operations in the Marine Command, Rear Admiral Jürgen zur Mühlen.

== Accommodation ==
=== Barracks ===
The EAZS is located in a barracks facility that served as a training facility for submarine crews during World War II. The naval base belonging to the EAZS was now home to submarines, inland minesweepers and speedboats. After a brief use as a naval supply school, the newly established submarine training group was stationed in Neustadt in 1960. The barracks also serve as a base for the Federal Police.

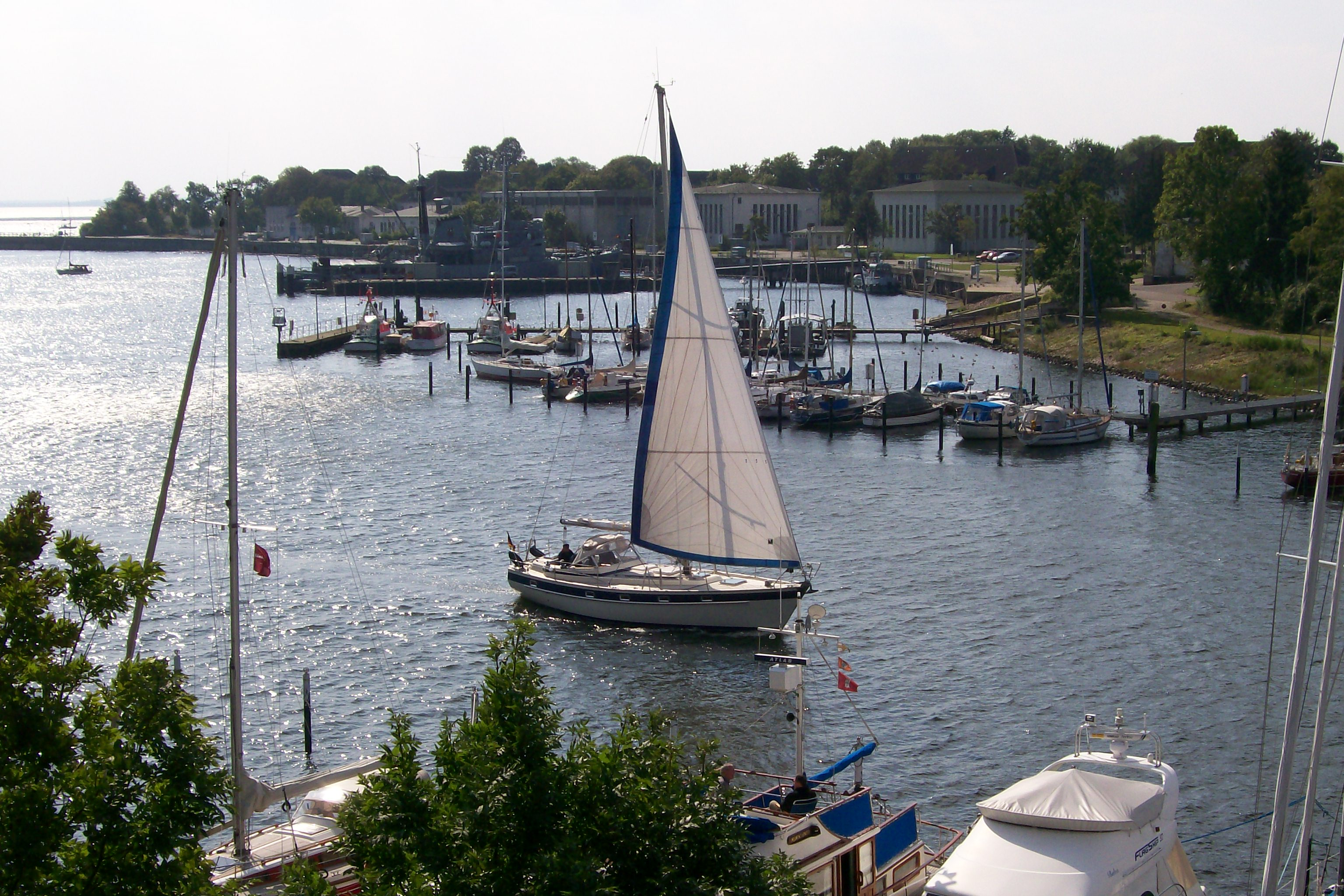
View over the Neustädter Hafen to the base and the facilities of the EAZS

=== Facilities ===
The following training facilities are available at EAZS:

- Fire hall - handling fire extinguishers and breathing protection when extinguishing fire Breathing apparatus training facility - exercise training with breathing apparatus
- Leak defense torso - ship section on land for training in leak defense
- Exercise hulk - former Köln frigate for fire defense and leak prevention exercises in realistic surroundings as well as the fleet's diver training facility
- Deep diving pot - exit training for submarine crews
- Diving training pool - diving training
- Rescue equipment and diver training hall - diving training as well as rescue equipment training (life jacket and life raft) including wave simulation system
- Diving school boats Juist and Baltrum - diving training in open waters

== Gallery ==
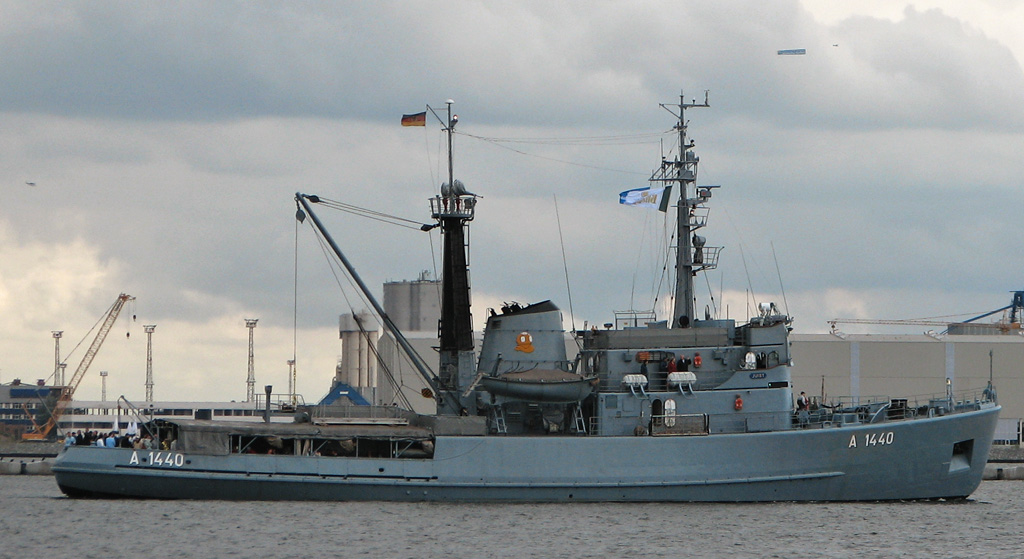
Juist (A1440)

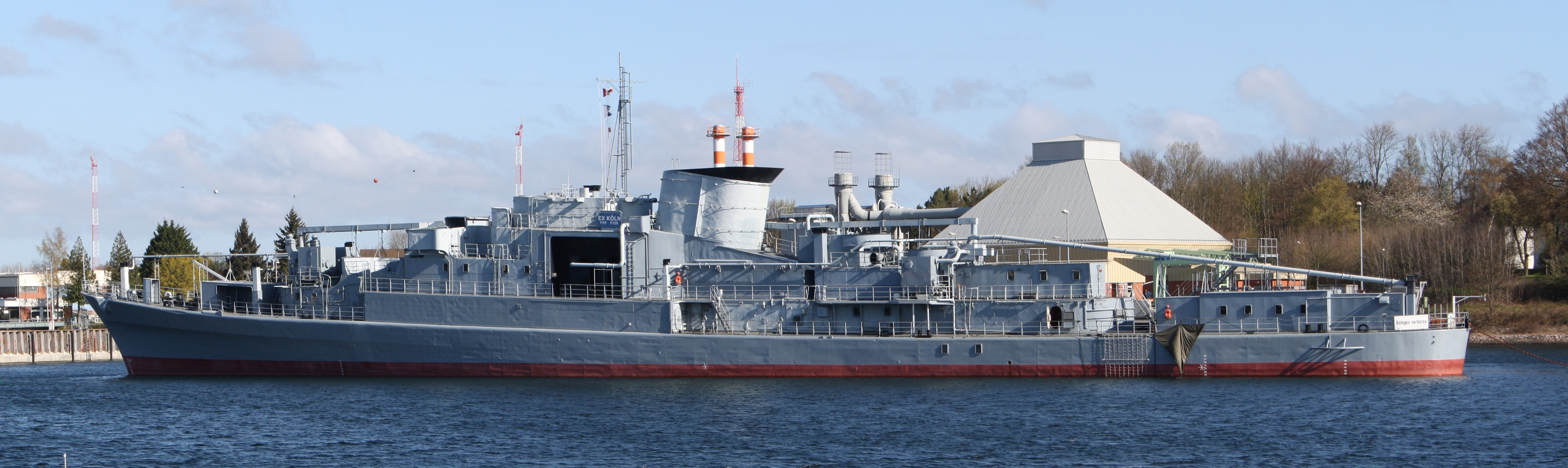
Ex-Köln (F220)

== See also ==
- German Navy
