= Naval Operations School =

German Naval Operations School

Coordinates: 53.544864°N 8.589039°E

- Marineoperationsschule
- Insignia of the Marineoperationsschule
- Founded: 15 July 1956; 70 years ago
- Country: Germany
- Branch: German Navy
- Type: Naval training establishment
- Part of: German Navy
- Garrison/HQ: Bremerhaven

Commanders
- Kommandeur: Captain Eckhard Bödeker

The Marineoperationsschule (MOS) was a naval school and is the central training facility of the German navy for tactics, navigation and communication with headquarters in Bremerhaven and training group in Wilhelmshaven. Since 1 October 2012 she has been subordinate to the Head of Personnel, Training, Organization in the Navy Command in Rostock.

== History ==
=== Barracks ===
The barracks of the later Naval Operations School was built between the World Wars in the Geesteschleife on the site of the former Joh. C. Tecklenborg shipyard in the Bremerhaven district of Geestemünde. After the Second World War, the facility was used by the US naval forces in Germany. From 1952, German members of the Labor Service Unit (B) were trained there. The German Navy took over the training facilities in 1956. Two schools were created, the Technical Naval School II (TMS II) with a teaching group and the Naval Locating School as a forerunner of the later Naval Operation School.

=== Naval Tracking School ===
The naval tracking school was set up on 15 July 1956, and was initially under the naval telecommunications command, which was renamed in 1962 to command of the naval command service. From 1965 until it was decommissioned, it was under the Naval Office. For practical navigation training, the MOS was given a former clearing boat of the Kriegsmarine with the name OT 1 in 1957. In its place came the school frigate Scheer in 1959, which was under the control of the MOS until it was decommissioned in 1967.

From 1973 to 1982, in addition to its headquarters in Bremerhaven, MOS had a branch in Knüppelholz in Drangstedt in a former military hospital area of the Air Force, which housed the basic training group, the naval training company for use abroad and the Drangstedt ship control center. The area has been partially cleared.

In 1975, the marine technical college for electrical engineering was established as part of the MOS.

On 30 September 1997 the naval locating school was decommissioned, and on 1 October 1997 the naval operations school was set up in a new organization. The new teaching group C (electronics training), formerly the marine location school teaching group B, was relocated to the marine technology school in Parow in March 2000.

=== Naval Operations School ===
From the time it was set up until 30 September 2012 the school was subordinate to the Navy Office and, from 1 October 2012, to the Naval Command.

On 1 October 2012, the teaching group (teaching group system training navy) of the disbanded command naval command systems in Wilhelmshaven (naval base Heppenser Groden) was subordinated to the MOS. She remains at her previous place of employment.

== Gallery ==
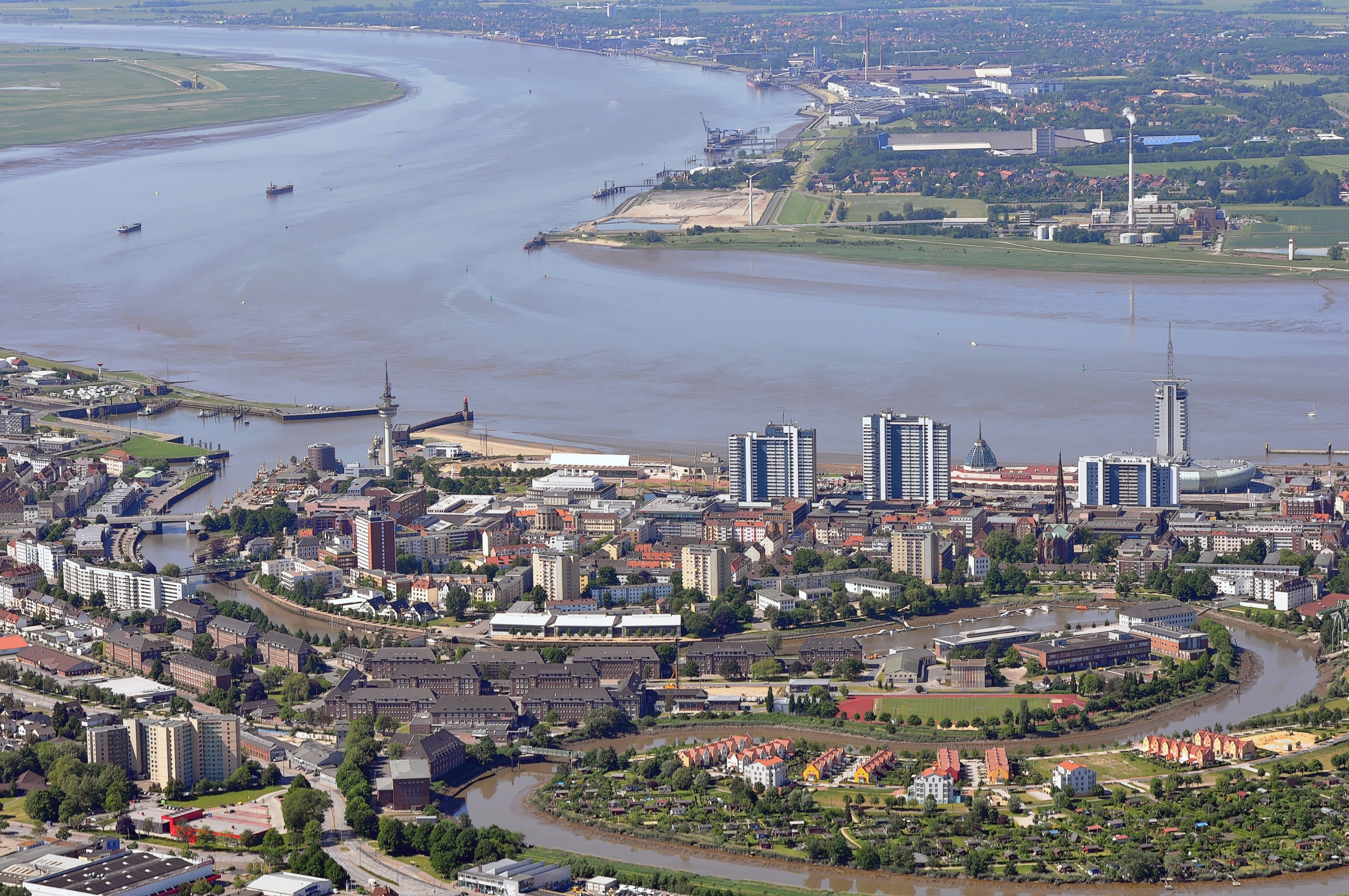
The site of the MOS in the Geesteschleife

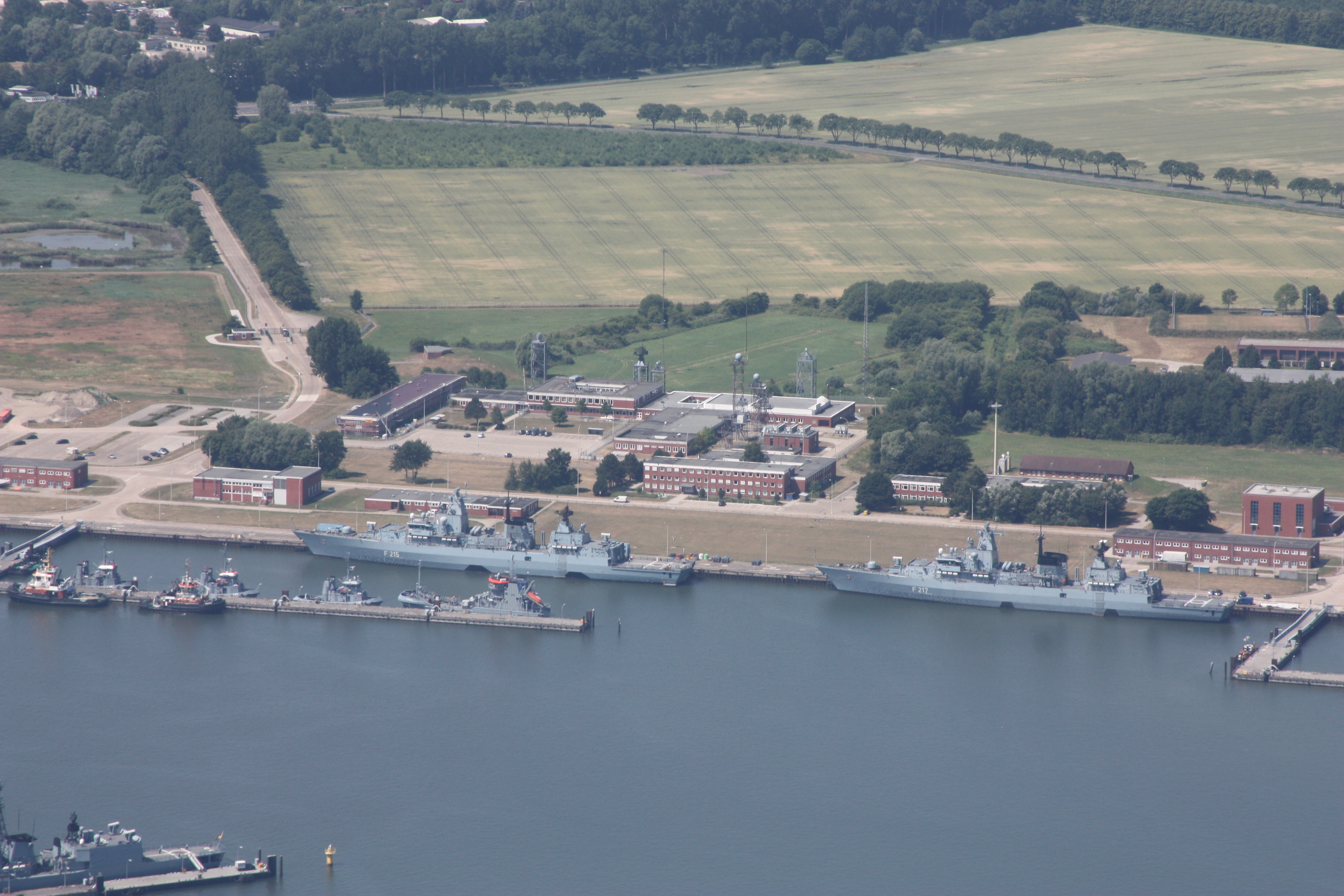
The buildings of the system training teaching group at the Heppenser Groden naval base in Wilhelmshaven

== See also ==
- German Navy
