= Jan Christian Kaack =

German admiral (born 1952)

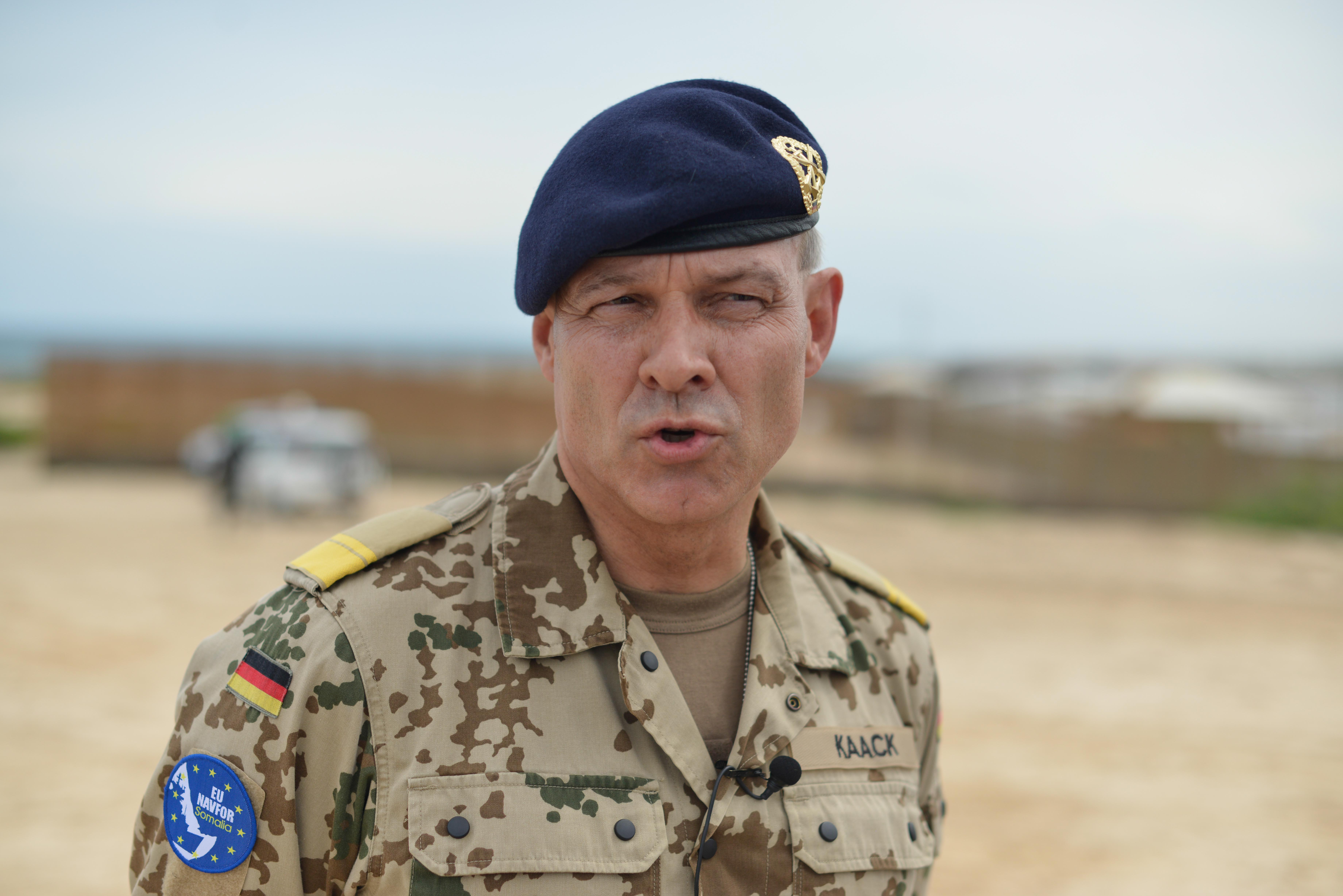
- Born: 24 December 1962 (age 63); Eutin, Schleswig-Holstein, West Germany
- Allegiance: West Germany (to 1990); Germany
- Branch: German Navy
- Service years: 1979–present
- Rank: Vice admiral
- Commands: Inspector of the Navy; NATO Joint Warfare Centre; Deputy Chief of the Joint Support Service Command; Einsatzflottille 1; Bayern; S50 Panther; S49 Wolf
- Awards: Meritorious Service Medal (Singapore)
- Alma mater: Mürwik Naval School; University of the Bundeswehr Hamburg; Bundeswehr Command and Staff College; U.S. Naval War College

Jan Christian Kaack (born 24 December 1962) is a Vizeadmiral of the German Navy and as of March 11, 2022 Inspector of the Navy.

== Service ==
Kaack joined the navy in October 1979 and was initially assigned as a navigator to 7. Schnellbootgeschwader. He began officer training at the Naval Academy Mürwik, Flensburg in October 1983, graduating in September 1984. From October 1984 to December 1987 he studied economics and organisational science at the University of the Bundeswehr Hamburg, and in January 1988 began specialised training in surface warfare at the Naval Warfare School at Kappeln, completing the course in March 1989. Kaack's next assignment was as a Weapons Officer in 3. Schnellbootgeschwader at Flensburg from April 1989 to August 1991. He then spent a period on secondment with the French Navy from September 1991 to June 1992, serving as navigation officer aboard the helicopter carrier Jeanne d'Arc.

Kaack's next two years of service were spent commanding fast attack craft, S49 Wolf and S50 Panther, as part of 3. Schnellbootgeschwader from July 1992 to September 1994. From October 1994 to November 1995 he underwent advanced technical training at the Marine Operations School, Bremerhaven, before deploying from December 1995 to September 1997 as operations officer on the destroyer Rommel. Kaack then undertook admiral staff training at the Military Academy of the German Armed Forces at Hamburg from October 1997 to September 1999, before becoming first officer of the destroyer Mölders the following month. He served in this role until March 2001, before being appointed as Staff Officer at Allied Joint Force Command Brunssum until December 2002. He spent January to March 2003 on parental leave, before returning to active service as commander of the frigate Bayern.

Kaack served as commander of the Bayern until June 2004, before taking up an appointment as Deputy Head of the Armed Forces Staff at the Federal Ministry of Defence. After the completion of this service in June 2006, he began a one-year postgraduate degree at the US Naval War College, Newport, Rhode Island. On his return to Germany in August 2007 Kaack became head of admiral staff training at the Military Academy of the German Armed Forces, holding the post until September 2008, when he became Deputy Commander and Chief of Staff of Einsatzflottille 1 at Kiel. This posting lasted until September 2012, and the following month Kaack became Head of the Military Policy and Operations Unit (Sub-Saharan Africa, America, Arctic) at the Federal Ministry of Defence. With the completion of this posting in September 2014 he took up the position of Head of the Concepts and International Cooperation Branch at Navy Command, Rostock. In May 2015 he became commander of Einsatzflottille 1 and director of NATO's Centre of Excellence for Operations in Confined and Shallow Waters. He held this post until April 2018, when he became one of the Deputy Chiefs of the Joint Support Service Command. Kaack assumed command of NATO's Joint Warfare Centre in Stavanger, Norway, on July 10, 2019, and thereby became the centre's ninth Commander.

He became acting Inspector of the Navy (commander of the German Navy) as a result of Kay-Achim Schönbach's resignation of the 22nd of January 2022. As of March 11th, 2022 he became the Inspector of the Navy.

In October 2024, he was awarded Singapore's Meritorious Service Medal by the Minister for Defence, Ng Eng Hen.
