= Horst-Dieter Kolletschke =

German admiral

- Born: 29 February 1952 (age 74); Eckernförde, Germany
- Allegiance: Germany
- Branch: German Navy
- Service years: 1975–2014
- Rank: Konteradmiral (rear admiral)
- Commands: Navy Office

Horst-Dieter Kolletschke (born 29 February 1952) is a retired Konteradmiral (rear admiral) of the German Navy.

== Biography ==
Born in Eckernförde, from 1972 to 1975 Kolletschke studied electrical engineering at the University of Applied Sciences Kiel, before joining the navy. After finishing his officer training, Kolletschke continued his studies in electrical engineering at the University of the Bundeswehr Munich from 1976 to 1979, earning a Diplom. Kolletschke then worked as a logistics officer and squadron commander in Naval Air Wing 5 based in Holtenau. He in 1983 returned to the University of the Bundeswehr Munich to work in military research and development at the Institut für Elektrische Maschinen und Antriebstechnik. While working there he received his Doktoringenieur (engineering doctoral degree) in 1987. From April 2010 to October 2012, Kolletschke served as the last head of the Navy Office, overseeing its integration into the new Navy Command, which he joined in 2012 as the head of operational support. Upon retiring in August 2014 Kolletschke handed over his position to Flottillenadmiral Karl-Wilhelm Ohlms.

Military offices
Preceded by Vizeadmiral Axel Schimpf	Chief of the Navy Office; 2010 – 2012	Office abolished
