= Seebataillon =

German term for certain naval infantry or marine troops

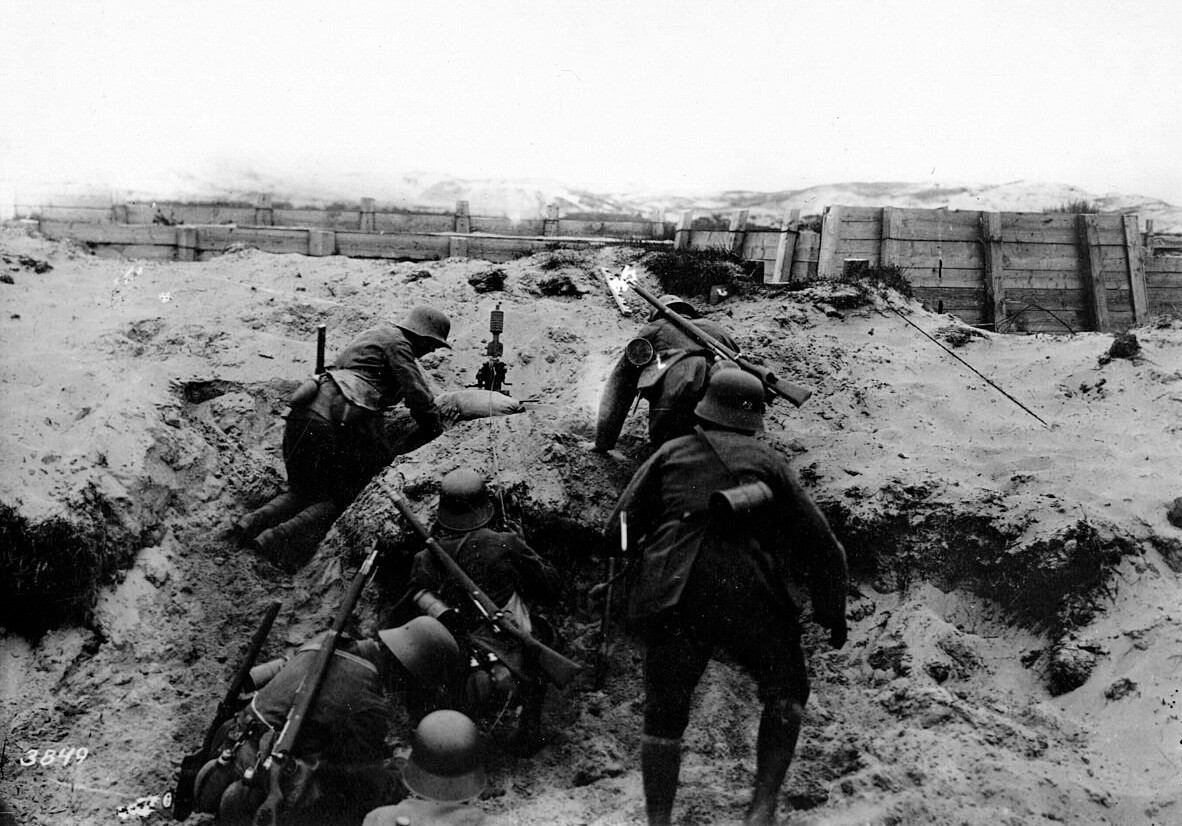
Seebataillon troops in Flanders during World War I, 1917

Seebataillon (plural Seebataillone), literally "sea battalion", is a German term for certain troops of naval infantry or marines. It was used by the Prussian Navy, the North German Federal Navy, the Imperial German Navy, the Austro-Hungarian Navy, the Kriegsmarine, and briefly in the Bundesmarine.

In 2014, the modern German Navy established a naval force protection unit called Seebataillon.

== Establishment and history ==
=== Kingdom of Prussia ===
The first Seebataillon was organized on 13 May 1852 as the Royal Prussian Marinier-Korps at Stettin. This formation provided small contingents of marines to perform traditional functions such as protecting officers, general policing aboard warships, and limited amphibious shore intrusions. The Seebataillon in 1870 had a strength of 22 officers and 680 non-commissioned officers and men. Battalion headquarters was then located at Kiel.

=== German Empire ===
After the establishment of the German Empire in 1871, Chancellor Otto von Bismarck more or less ignored the navy, as it did “not fit his intentions”. Bismarck’s continental policies sought to avoid colonial or naval entanglements and he would oppose plans to further develop navy forces. With the creation of the Imperial Admiralty, Prussian Army Generalleutnant Albrecht von Stosch was appointed chief. Stosch had no experience in naval matters, but “nevertheless, brought significant administrative talents to his new post.” He also perceived military power to emanate “from the tip of an army bayonet.”

Stosch ended the practice of placing marines aboard warships; instead, he adopted a concept that became known as Infanterieismus. He would train seamen as naval infantry, qualified in using small arms and competent in infantry tactics and amphibious operations. That approach would position the Seebataillon as a compact, self-contained organization, roughly equivalent to the British Royal Marine Light Infantry.

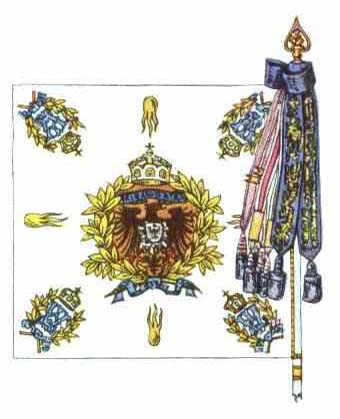
Flag of III. Seebataillon based at Qingdao

Enlargement of the battalion to six companies allowed a reorganization and the transfer of half of the battalion to Wilhelmshaven to form the II. Seebataillon. Both battalions were then increased in size to four companies. Scheduled exchanges of officers from the Prussian Army brought current tactical thinking to the sea battalions. Among others, 1st Lieutenant Erich Ludendorff served 1888–1891 as company commander; Lt.Col. Paul Emil von Lettow-Vorbeck was commanding officer from 1909 to 1913 of the 2nd Sea Battalion at Wilhelmshaven.

After the successful occupation of Jiaozhou in China on 14 November 1897 by the navy’s East Asia Cruiser Division in a demonstration of Infanterieismus, two companies from the first and two companies from the II. Seebataillon were fused to form a third formation, the III. Seebataillon. This new battalion arrived at Qingdao on 26 January 1898 to garrison the East Asian Station of the imperial navy. It was, and remained, the only all-German unit with permanent status in an overseas protectorate.

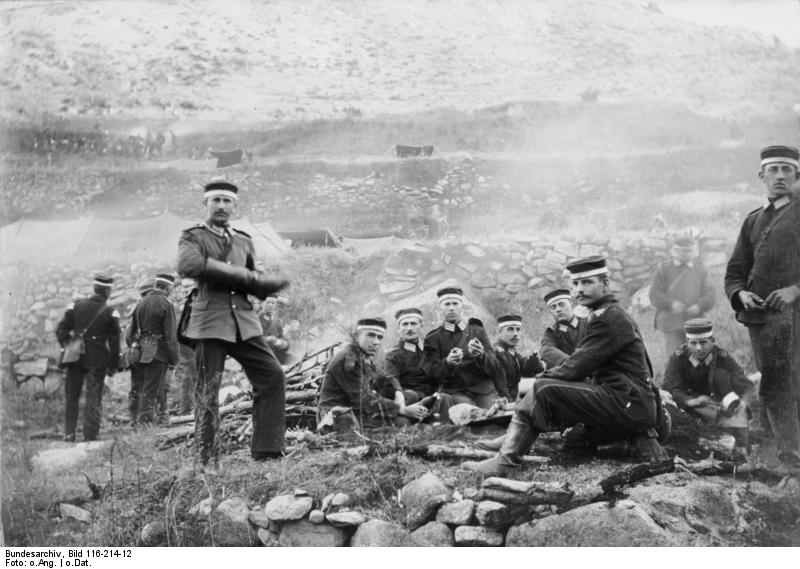
German marines in Jiaozhou

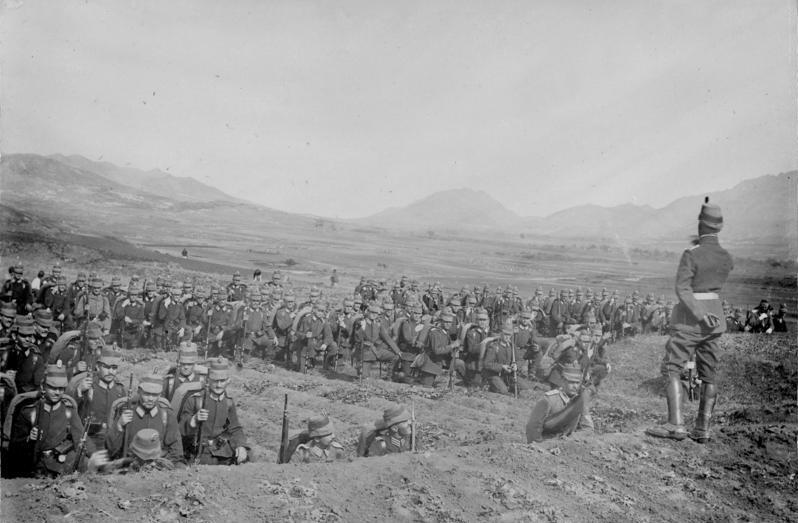
III. Seebataillon during field exercises in Jiaozhou

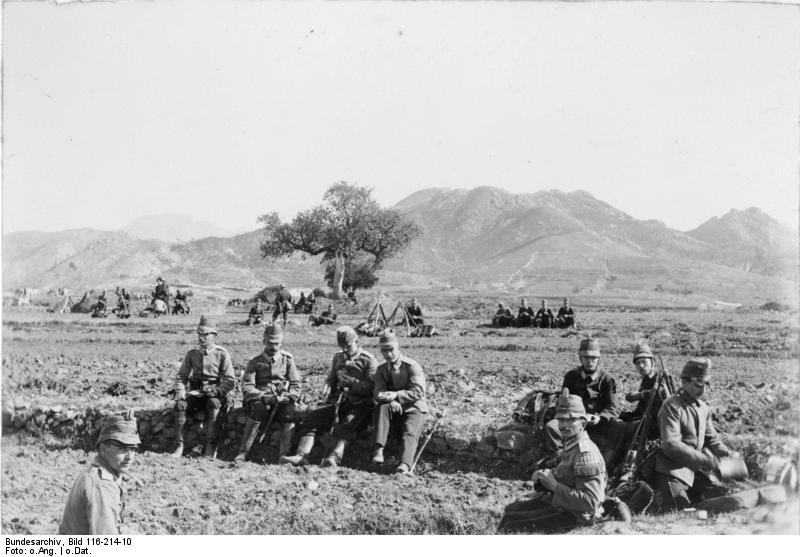
German marines in the field in Jiaozhou

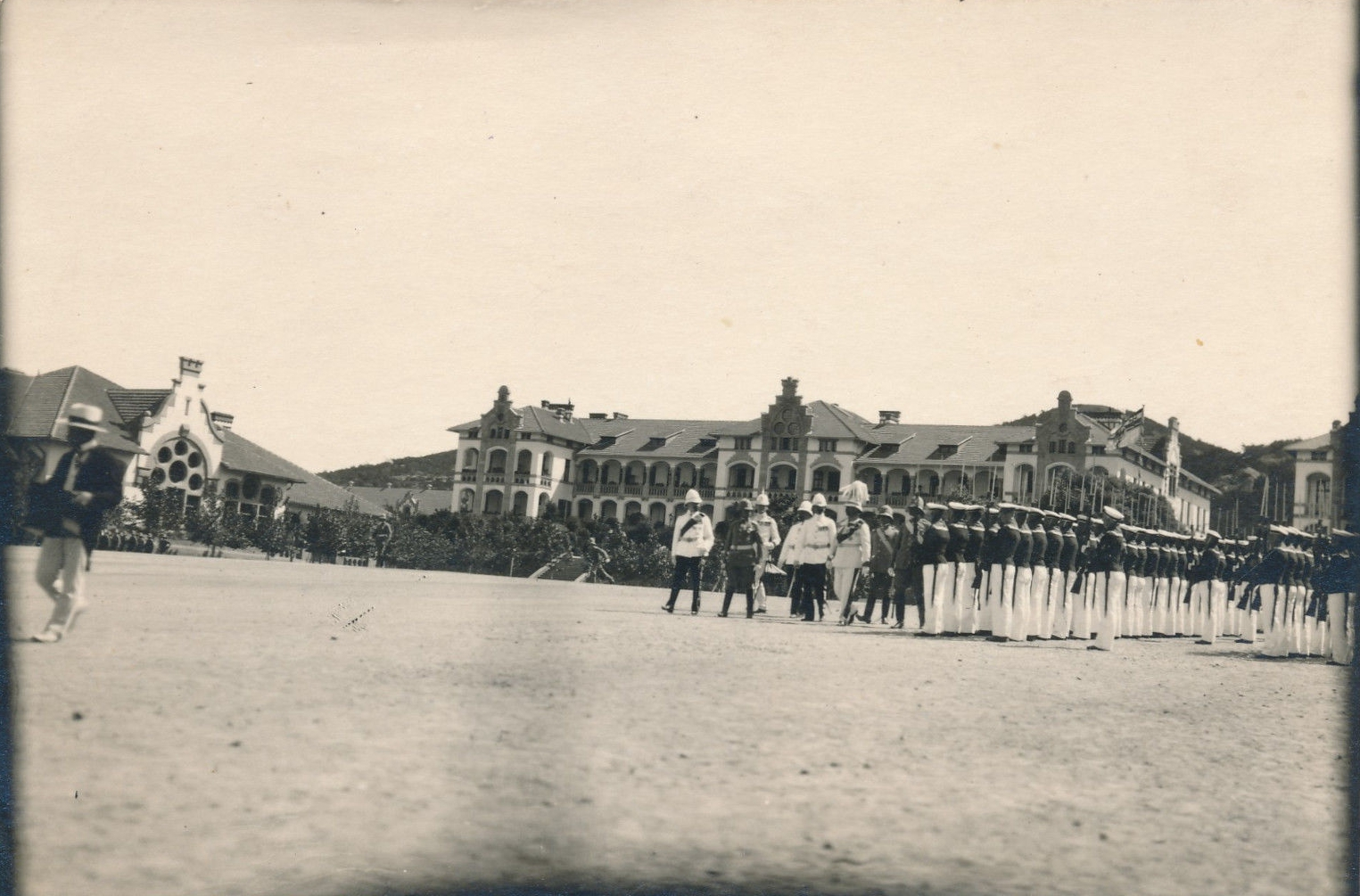
German marine formation at Qingdao

== Colonial deployments ==
Since the mid-1880s, Seebataillon troops were frequently used as temporary intervention forces, mostly in the colonies. A company was sent in 1884 to German Kamerun. During the Boxer Rebellion in China from 1900 to 1901, the I. and II. Seebataillone, reinforced by an engineer company and field artillery battery, comprised the German contingent to the international relief force. In 1904–1908 during the Herero Wars, a formation in battalion strength supported the Schutztruppe in German South West Africa; during 1905–1906 a Seebataillon detachment served in German East Africa during the Maji Maji Rebellion.

== Units and garrisons in 1912 ==
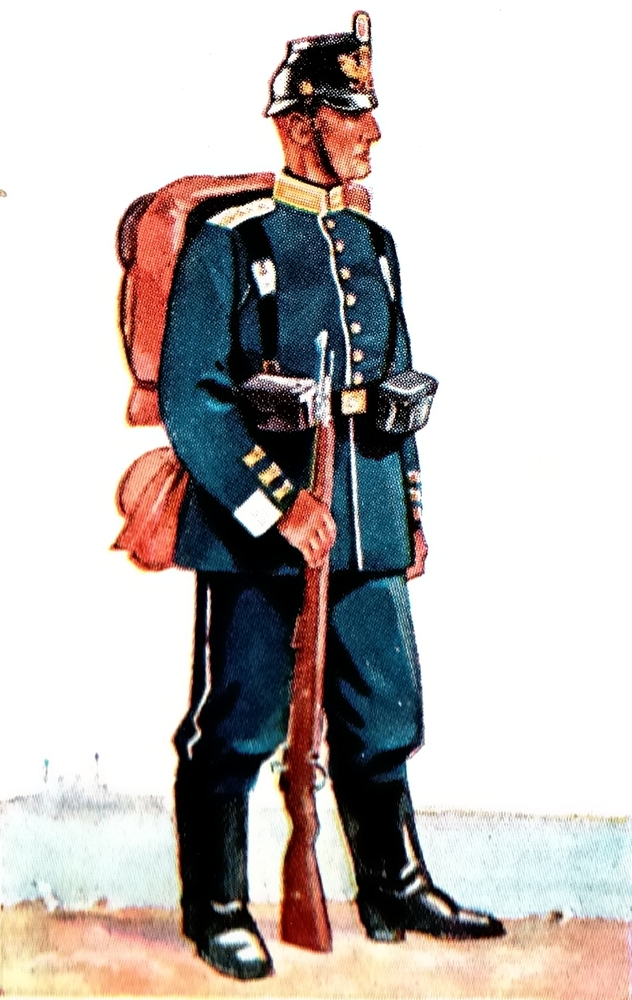
Naval infantryman in full marching order, 1910

- I. Seebataillon at Kiel on the Baltic
- II. Seebataillon at Wilhelmshaven on the North Sea
- III. Seebataillon at Qingdao (with its replacement and training base at Cuxhaven)

Additional small formations were the East Asian Marine Detachment (OMD) at Beijing and Tianjin, and Marine-Detachment Skutari, a company composed of personnel from I. and II. Seebataillone as Marine-Detachment in internationally occupied Albania.

== World War I ==
The outbreak of the Great War saw the rapid expansion of marine forces into division size units. Drawing on Seebataillon reservists and conscripts, the naval infantry brigade under Generalmajor von Wiechmann grew into the Marine Division; an additional Marine Division was formed in November 1914. These two divisions formed Marine-Korps-Flandern (Naval Corps Flanders) under Admiral Ludwig von Schröder (known in Germany as the "Lion of Flanders"). In early February 1917, a third Marine Division was organized, thus giving the naval infantry corps a strength of 70,000 men.

Marine units fought in 1914 at Tsingtao and Antwerp, in 1915 at Ypres, in 1916 on the Somme, in 1917 in Flanders, and during the 1918 offensive battles in northern France.

== World War II ==
The Marine-Stoßtrupp-Kompanie was formed in March 1938. It initially consisted of two infantry platoons, one engineer platoon, and one weapons platoon with a total strength about 250 men. On 1 September 1939, it took part in the Battle of Westerplatte.

In 1940, the unit was expanded to six companies as Marine-Stoßtrupp-Abteilung. The formation participated in the occupation of Normandy and the Channel Islands.

In 1945, a number of Navy sailors were sent to fight in the Battle of Berlin by order of Grand Admiral Dönitz, while thousands were organized into infantry formations. Those included the 1st Naval Infantry Division and other divisions.

== Bundesmarine ==
In April 1958, a marine engineer battalion was raised for the Federal German Navy and was initially under the command of the destroyer forces commander. After several reorganizations, the amphibious groups of the Federal Navy were dissolved or reassigned in 1993.

== German Navy ==
Badge of the current Seebataillon

On 1 April 2014, a new Seebataillon was formed from existing naval protection forces, boarding teams, and the Minentaucher company. The German Navy Seebataillon was integrated into the Royal Netherlands Marine Corps Command in 2016, allowing access to the vast experience of the Dutch marines in global amphibious operations, training, use of specialised equipment (amphibious ships), and facilities (Texel Island – Amphibious training grounds).

== Footnotes and references ==
- Gottschall, Terrell D. By Order of the Kaiser. Otto von Diederichs and the Rise of the Imperial German Navy, 1865–1902. Annapolis: Naval Institute Press, 2003. ISBN 1-55750-309-5
- Nuhn, Walter. Kolonialpolitik und die Marine. Bonn: Bernard & Graefe Verlag, 2002. ISBN 3-7637-6241-8
