= Axel Schimpf =

- Born: 1 October 1952 (age 73); Speyer, West Germany
- Allegiance: Germany
- Branch: German Navy
- Service years: 1971–2014
- Rank: Vizeadmiral (vice admiral)
- Commands: Navy Office; Navy Command
- Awards: Badge of Honour of the Bundeswehr in Gold; NATO Medal for Yugoslavia; Commander of the National Order of Merit; Cross of the Order of Merit of the Federal Republic of Germany

Axel Schimpf (born 1 October 1952) is a retired Vizeadmiral (vice admiral) of the German Navy.

== Biography ==
Schimpf served as Inspector of the Navy from April 2010 to October 2014. He previously served as an officer on German fast attack craft, and as chief of the Navy Office from 2008 to 2010. He retired from military service on 28 October 2014, when he was replaced as Inspector by Andreas Krause.

Military offices
Preceded by Vizeadmiral Wolfgang E. Nolting	Inspector of the Navy; 28 April 2010 – 28 October 2014	Succeeded by Vizeadmiral Andreas Krause
Preceded by Konteradmiral Ulrich Otto	Chief of the Navy Office; 2008 – 2010	Succeeded by Konteradmiral Horst-Dieter Kolletschke
Preceded by Konteradmiral Jörg Auer	Deputy Inspector of the Navy; 2004 – January 2008	Succeeded by Konteradmiral Hans-Jochen Witthauer
