= Kay-Achim Schönbach =

German retired admiral (born 1965)

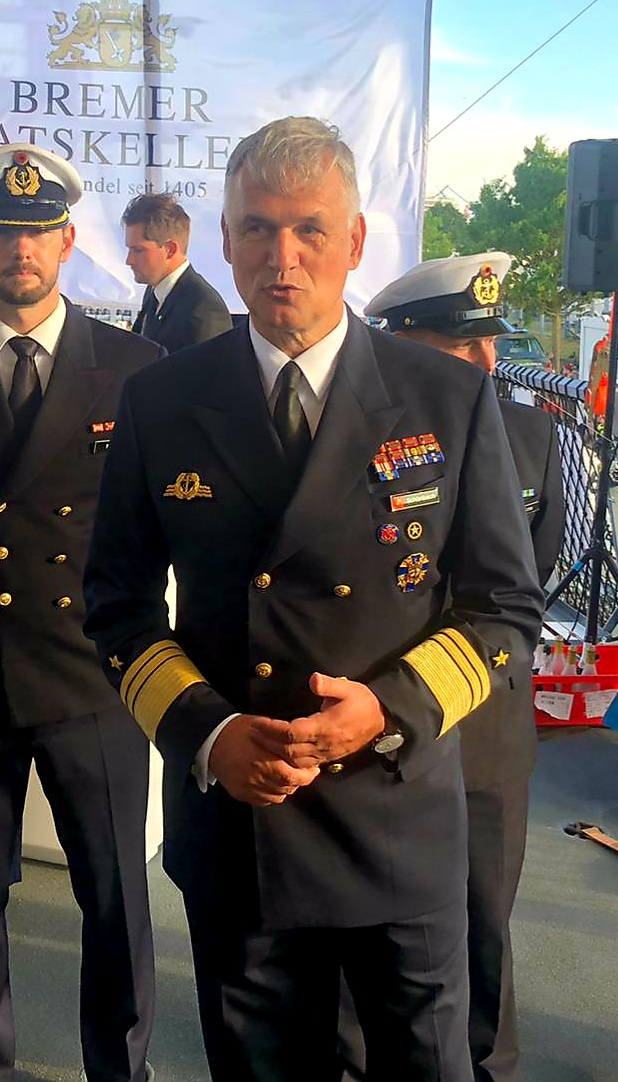
- Born: 9 July 1965 (age 61); Kassel, West Germany
- Alma mater: University of the Bundeswehr Hamburg; Bundeswehr Command and Staff College
- Military career
- Allegiance: West Germany (to 1990); Germany
- Branch: German Navy
- Service years: 1984–2022
- Rank: Vice admiral
- Commands: Inspector of the Navy; Mürwik Naval School; Standing NATO Maritime Group 2; 4th Frigate Squadron; Mecklenburg-Vorpommern

Kay-Achim Schönbach (born 9 July 1965 in Kassel) is a retired German vice admiral who served as the Inspector of the Navy of the German Navy from 24 March 2021 to 22 January 2022. Schönbach was forced to resign his position after his political remarks regarding the ongoing Russo-Ukrainian crisis and prospects of Ukraine and Georgia joining NATO sparked intense opposition from the Ukrainian Foreign Ministry.

== Life ==
Kay-Achim Schönbach joined the Bundeswehr in 1984. He served in various positions in the German Navy, including being the commanding officer of the frigate Mecklenburg-Vorpommern from 2008 to 2010, through her service in the Operation Enduring Freedom and Operation Atalanta off the Horn of Africa.

He then taught at the Bundeswehr Command and Staff College in Hamburg from 2010 to 2012, commanded the 4th Frigate Squadron in Wilhelmshaven from 2012 to 2014 and headed the Division for the Europe/Eurasia and Arctic region in the Military Policy and Operations Department at the Federal Ministry of Defence from 2014 to 2016.

Schönbach's subsequent assignments included being the commander of the Standing NATO Maritime Group 2 from June to December 2016 and of the Mürwik Naval School from January 2017 to May 2018, when he became Deputy Head of Strategy and Operations at the Federal Ministry of Defence. On 24 March 2021 he was appointed the Inspector of the Navy, succeeding Vice Admiral Andreas Kraus.

=== Resignation ===
External videos
- Schönbach answering the question on the eastwards expansion of NATO at the MP-IDSA

Schönbach's talk on 21 January 2022 at the Manohar Parrikar Institute for Defense Studies and Analyses (MP-IDSA) think tank in New Delhi, amid the growing tensions on the Russian-Ukrainian border, made international news headlines and caused a political controversy. The admiral said that Russia's alleged intention to invade Ukraine was "nonsense" and that Ukraine would never be able to regain Crimea.

He further added that Vladimir Putin "wants and probably also deserves respect", Ukraine was not ready to join NATO, and while Georgia met the requirements, it would not be "smart" to admit the country into the alliance.

Schönbach also said that "Russia is an old country and important country, we need Russia because China" without mentioning that Russian Federation and Ukraine both declared their independence from the Soviet Union in 1991. Ambassador of Ukraine to Germany Andriy Melnyk said that Schönbach's "patronising attitude subconsciously also reminds Ukrainians of the horrors of the Nazi occupation, when Ukrainians were treated as subhuman." Schönbach also told his interlocutors being a "very radical Roman Catholic" himself and suggested that "Russia is a Christian country" and the country is needed against China "even if Putin is an atheist, it doesn't matter".

In response, the Ukrainian Foreign Ministry summoned the German ambassador in Kyiv to protest Schönbach's comments, while the German government stated that the admiral's remarks did not reflect Germany's position. On 22 January, Schönbach resigned his command "to avoid any more damage being done to the German navy and above all, to the German federal republic".

== Political activity ==
Schönbach is a former member of Christian-conservative CDU. In early 2024, he left the party and joined the newly founded right-wing Values Union. In February 2024, Schönbach was elected as the Deputy Chairman of the party. Schönbach later would join Bündnis Deutschland and become the leading candidate for the 2025 election.

Military offices
Preceded by Andreas Krause	Inspector of the Navy; 2021–2022	Succeeded by Jan Christian Kaack
