= Naval Medical Institute =

German Naval Medical Institute

Coordinates: 54.3397067°N 10.0944913°E

- Schifffahrtmedizinisches Institut der Marine
- Insignia of the Schifffahrtmedizinisches Institut der Marine
- Founded: 2 January 1961; 65 years ago
- Country: Germany
- Branch: German Navy
- Type: Naval training establishment
- Size: 84 personnel
- Part of: German Navy
- Garrison/HQ: Kronshagen

Commanders
- Kommandeur: Doctor Dirk Möllmann

The Schifffahrtmedizinisches Institut der Marine (SchiffMedInstM) is a naval medical institute of the German Navy in Kronshagen. It is the central specialist facility for all medical officers in the German Navy. In addition to the marine medical competence for the fleet, diving medicine also provides services for the entire Bundeswehr. The institute is scheduled to move into a new building on the grounds of the German Armed Forces Hospital in Hamburg in 2023.

== History ==
The Naval Medical Institute of the Navy was founded on January 2, 1961, under the name Uboots- und Taucherphysiologisches Institut der Marine (UTPIM) with its seat in the medical area of the Technische Marineschule (TMS I). The agency has had its current name since May 1, 1965. The office has been located on the site of the former naval hospital since August 1961. With the transformation of the Bundeswehr and the associated restructuring of the naval medical service, the command of the troops was again transferred to the head of the Navy Office.

Since 1 October 2012, it has been subordinate to the Head of the Marine Medical Department and Admiralty Doctor of the Navy in the Navy Command in Rostock.

== See also ==
- German Navy
