= Navy Office =

Navy Office can refer to:

- Navy Office (Germany), a command of the German Navy
- Navy Office (Royal Navy) a government office (that included the British Navy Board) established in 1546 in England; also its headquarters building in Whitehall, London.
