= Naval Engineering School (Germany) =

German Naval Engineering School

Coordinates: 54.362175°N 13.079728°E

- Marinetechnikschule
- Insignia of the Marinetechnikschule
- Founded: 28 March 1996; 30 years ago
- Country: Germany
- Branch: German Navy
- Type: Naval training establishment
- Part of: German Navy
- Garrison/HQ: Parow

Commanders
- Kommandeur: Captain Oliver Jülke
- Stellvertretender Kommandeur: Captain Jan-Peter Giesecke

The Marinetechnikschule (MTS) in Parow is an engineering school of the German Navy. The school has existed in its current form since 1996 and is the largest training facility in the German Navy. She is subordinate to the operational support commander in the naval command in Rostock, but is technically assigned to the local head of personnel, training, organization.

== History ==
The Parow district of the Kramerhof municipality, a few kilometers north of Stralsund, has been the location of various military bases for many years. From 1936 until the end of the war, the Parow aviator base existed. From 1950 until the reunification, crews and petty officers of the Volksmarine were trained here in the Walter Steffens' naval school. The university entrance qualification for officer students of the Volksmarine also took place at the naval school. These then usually studied at the officers' college of the Volksmarine Karl Liebknecht in Stralsund with the professional goal of officers.

In the course of the structural reform of the Navy after the fall of the Berlin wall in the GDR, it was decided to reduce the number of naval schools. The technical training for all ranks, which previously took place in eight different locations, should be concentrated in a newly established marine technology school.

With the decision in favor of Parow and the groundbreaking started on 30 November 1992, the Bundeswehr's largest investment project in the new federal states began. The navy's largest and most modern school was built in a total of three construction phases between 1992 and 2003. Only a few of the old buildings have been preserved.

On 28 March 1996, Defense Minister Volker Rühe officially put the marine technology school into service. After the Technical Naval School II in Bremerhaven (1956–1982), the MTS training group A in Kiel was also dissolved in 2002.

== See also ==
- German Navy
