= Navy Command =

Navy Command may refer to:

- Navy Command (Germany)
- Navy Command (Royal Navy), UK
- Tanzania Naval Command
