= Andreas Krause (admiral) =

German admiral

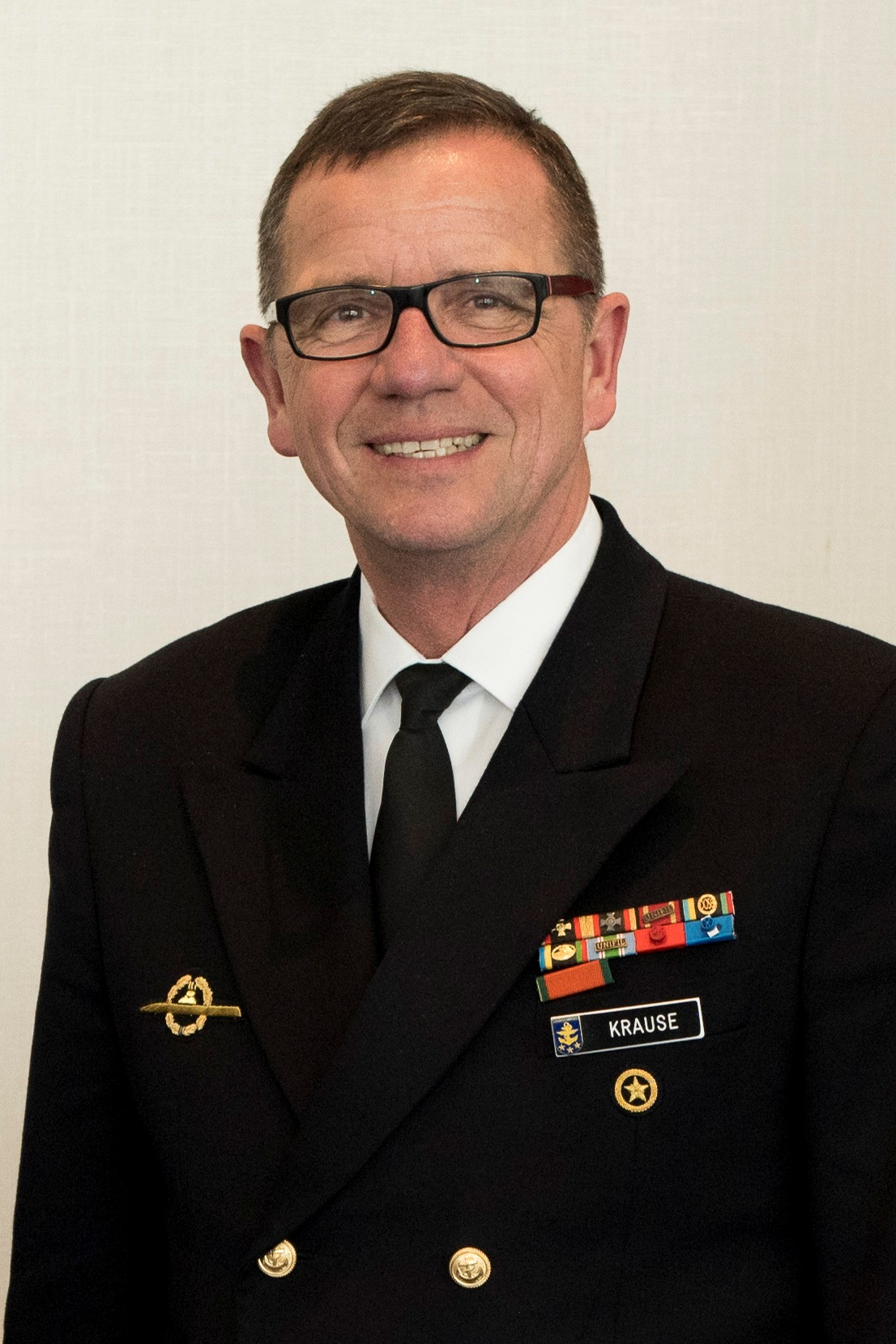
- Krause in 2017
- Born: 11 October 1956 (age 69); Lübeck, Schleswig-Holstein, Germany
- Allegiance: Germany
- Branch: German Navy
- Service years: 1976–2021
- Rank: Vizeadmiral (vice admiral)
- Commands: U-22; 1st Flotilla; Maritime Task Force, UNIFIL; Inspector of the Navy
- Awards: Cross of Honour of the Bundeswehr in Silver; Cross of Honour of the Bundeswehr in Gold; Deployment Medal in Bronze (UNIFIL); United Nations Medal (UNIFIL); Officier de la Légion d'Honneur; Officier de l'ordre national du Mérite

Andreas Krause (born 11 October 1956) is a Vizeadmiral (vice admiral) of the German Navy of the Bundeswehr, and he served as Inspector of the Navy. He previously served as a U-boat officer, as a staff officer in the Bundeswehr and NATO, as commander of the German Navy's 1st Flotilla and the Maritime Task Force for the United Nations Interim Force in Lebanon, and as Deputy Inspector of the Navy.

== Military career ==
=== Training and early service ===
Krause joined as the German Navy as an enlisted member, and after training to be a commissioned officer was promoted to Leutnant zur See in July 1979. In 1976, he attended the University of the Bundeswehr Hamburg, where he graduated with a pedagogy degree in 1981. Subsequently, he trained to be a U-boat officer. Between 1981 and 1986, Krause served as a watch officer aboard U-boats as well as a cadet platoon commander on the training ship Deutschland. In January 1982, Krause received a promotion to Oberleutnant zur See, and in 1985 he was promoted to Kapitänleutnant. A year later, in 1986, he took over as commander of the Type 206 U-boat U-22, serving until 1988. Between 1989 and 1990, he went through tactical officer training for naval operations, the "B" course on anti-submarine warfare.

=== Service as a staff officer ===
Krause took the 32nd Naval Staff Course at the Bundeswehr's Staff College in Hamburg, graduating in 1992 and subsequently was promoted to Korvettenkapitän (lieutenant commander). Thereafter, he served until 1993 as staff officer for operational planning in the Navy's U-boat flotilla. From 1993 to 1996 he held various posts in the Naval Staff and the Staff of the Armed Forces at the Federal Ministry of Defence in Bonn. During this time he was promoted to Fregattenkapitän (commander) in April 1995. From 1996 to 1999 he commanded the U-boat training center in Eckernförde.

After leaving the training center command, he was a unit head at NATO Joint Headquarters North East from 1999 to 2001, in Karup, Denmark. During this time, he was promoted to Captain (Kapitän zur See) in April 2000. In 2001, he returned to Bonn to serve as a unit head for the Naval Staff. Krause remained in the Defence Ministry, serving as deputy head of the staff department for task forces in the Staff of the Armed Forces from 2003 to 2004.

=== Service as an admiral ===
In November 2004, Krause was promoted to Flottillenadmiral (flotilla admiral), and took over the post of leader of the staff department for concepts, planning, and management in the Naval Staff. On 1 July 2006, he became the first commander of the Navy's 1st Flotilla, in Kiel. From October 2006 to March 2007, he was additionally commander of the Maritime Task Force for the United Nations Interim Force in Lebanon, in charge of a multinational force of 19 vessels and about 1,500 personnel. In April 2007 Krause became the Director of the German Navy's newly formed Centre of Excellence for Operations in Confined and Shallow Waters (COE CSW). With the establishment of this office, the German Navy intended to respond to the shift in focus of naval operations from the high seas to coastal areas.

On 1 October 2008, Krause took the post of Deputy Commander and Chief of Staff of the Fleet Command in Glücksburg, and was promoted to Konteradmiral (rear admiral). On 27 August 2009, Krause took over the command of the Joint Operations Staff of the Ministry of Defense, providing support to the General Inspector of the Bundeswehr on operational matters. On 1 January 2012, he was promoted to Vizeadmiral (vice admiral), and appointed deputy commander of Allied Maritime Command Naples, serving until April 2013. On 1 August 2013, he was appointed Deputy Inspector of the Navy at the Navy Command in Rostock, the second-in-command of the German Navy. He took over from Axel Schimpf as Inspector of the Navy on 28 October 2014 until he relinquished the role in 2021 to his successor, Kay-Achim Schönbach, and retired.

Military offices
Preceded by Vizeadmiral Axel Schimpf	Inspector of the Navy; 28 October 2014–24 March 2021	Succeeded by Vizeadmiral Kay-Achim Schönbach
