= Sea Battalion (Germany) =

- Seebataillon
- Coat of arms of the German Naval Force Protection Battalion
- Active: 2014–present
- Country: Germany
- Branch: German Navy
- Type: Naval infantry
- Size: ~1,500
- Part of: Einsatzflottille 1
- Garrison/HQ: Eckernförde
- Nickname: Multitool der Marine (Multitool of the Navy)
- Motto: Vom Land zum Meer – Vom Meer zum Land (From land to sea - from sea to land)
- Website: Official website

Commanders
- Current commander: Fregattenkapitän Norman Bronsch

Insignia
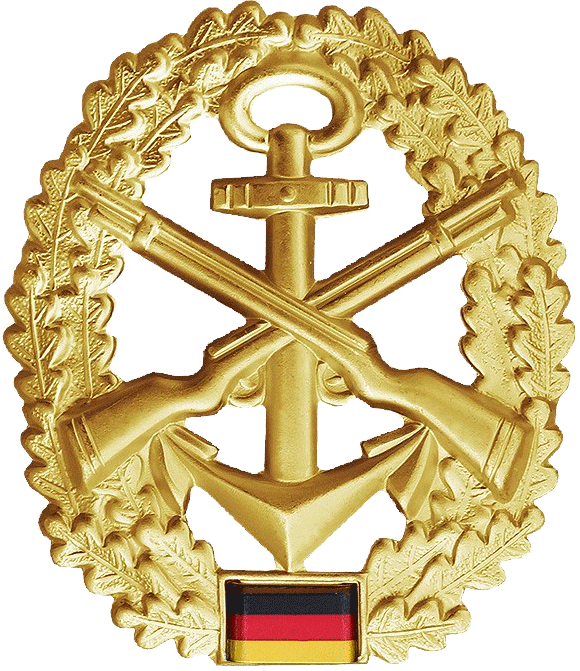
- Beret badge

The Sea Battalion (German: Seebataillon) is a land formation of the German Navy. It was formed in Eckernförde on 1 April 2014, succeeding the Naval Protection Force and the Naval Force Protection Battalion, against a background of rapidly escalating tensions in Eastern Europe centering around Ukraine.

== Organization ==
The Sea Battalion is made up of around 1,500 sailors and structured into four companies plus support elements. Every company, led by a lieutenant commander (Korvettenkapitän, OF-3), is specialized in specific field of force protection.

- Seebataillon
  - Headquarters
    - Amphibious Operations Group (Gruppe Amphibischer Einsatz)
    - Medical Operations Group (Gruppe Sanitätseinsatz)
    - Navy Specialized Forces Development Group (Gruppe Weiterentwicklung Spezialisierte Kräfte der Marine)
  - Reconnaissance Company (Aufklärungskompanie)
    - Technical Reconnaissance Platoon (Technischer Aufklärungszug)
    - Sniper Platoon (Scharfschützenzug)
    - HUMINT Platoon (Feldnachrichtenzug)
  - Boarding Operations Company 1 (Bordeinsatzkompanie 1)
    - 4× Boarding operations platoons
    - Tactical Sea Operations Unit (Taktische Einsatzeinheit See)
  - Boarding Operations Company 2 (Bordeinsatzkompanie 2)
    - 4× Boarding operations platoons
    - Tactical Sea Operations Unit (Taktische Einsatzeinheit See)
  - Coastal Operations Company (Küsteneinsatzkompanie)
    - 4× Coastal operations platoons
    - 5th Coastal Operations Platoon (Reserve unit)
  - Mine Clearance Diver Company (Minentaucherkompanie)
  - Training Company 1 (Ausbildungskompanie 1), in Alt Duvenstedt
  - Training Company 2 (Ausbildungskompanie 2)
  - Support Company (Unterstützungskompanie)
    - Technical Support (Technische Unterstützung)
    - Logistical Support (Logistische Unterstützung)
