= Leanne van den Hoek =

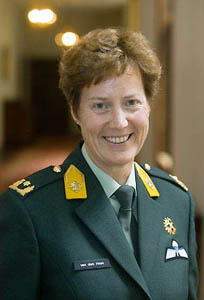
- General van den Hoek
- Born: 21 August 1958 (age 68); Rotterdam
- Military career
- Allegiance: Netherlands
- Branch: Royal Netherlands Army
- Service years: 1983–present
- Rank: Brigadier General
- Commands: Royal Netherlands Army Personnel office

Brigadier General Leanne van den Hoek (born 21 August 1958 in Rotterdam) is an officer of the Royal Netherlands Army. She is the first woman to hold a flag officer rank in the Dutch military. She is married, but has chosen not to have any children.

== Biography ==
Van den Hoek originally wanted to be a police officer, which was her childhood dream. However, she was refused for training due to poor eyesight. She therefore applied to the military academy instead, where she passed military physical selection (just; in 1979 the Dutch military still used the same physical criteria for men as for women), despite being slightly short (1.65 meter). Van den Hoek enrolled in the Koninklijke Militaire Academie at Breda as an officer cadet in 1979.

After her graduation in 1983 she held several operational positions in the area of Military Logistics; these positions had her stationed both in the Netherlands and in Germany. Regarding her choice for military logistics rather than primary combat training, Van den Hoek stated that back in 1983 combat positions entailed "sitting around all day waiting for the Russians to invade", a possibility she had thought was unlikely to happen. She chose logistics since "an army must always eat – be it in peacetime or at war".

She continued her military education in 1993, enrolling in the Hogere Militaire Vorming. Completing the training in 1994, she was assigned her first command position with the 41st Mechanized Brigade in Seedorf. She held this command until 1996, when she enrolled in the German Führungsakademie. Following this general staff training, she was assigned to the Army Staff in The Hague.

Van den Hoek set a first on 17 July 2001 when she became the first female battalion commander in the Royal Netherlands Army. She commanded the 200th Supply and Transport Battalion at Nunspeet and 't Harde. Promoted to colonel, she later became Director of the Defense Institute for Medical Screening and Selection.

On 1 November 2005 the Dutch State Secretary of Defence Cees van der Knaap promoted Van den Hoek to the rank of brigadier general. This made General Van den Hoek the first female flag officer of the Dutch military. She has been commanding officer of the Army Personnel Department since.

=== Outside the military ===
Van den Hoek is an enthusiastic athlete. Prior to 2000 she was an avid skydiver; she was part of the Dutch national team and participated in the precision skydiving world championships. She made a total of 1540 jumps before a karting accident in 2000 caused her a whiplash injury. This forced her to give up parachuting. She now plays golf instead.

=== Anecdotes ===
Upon being promoted battalion commander in 2001, Van den Hoek was interviewed on the radio. When asked whether she, as a woman in the military, was hampered by the glass ceiling, she got slightly irritated and responded "What's a glass ceiling?"
