= Groß Kedingshagen Manor =

Manor house in Kramerhof municipality, Germany

- Herrenhaus Groß Kedingshagen
- Kramerhof, Mecklenburg-Vorpommern
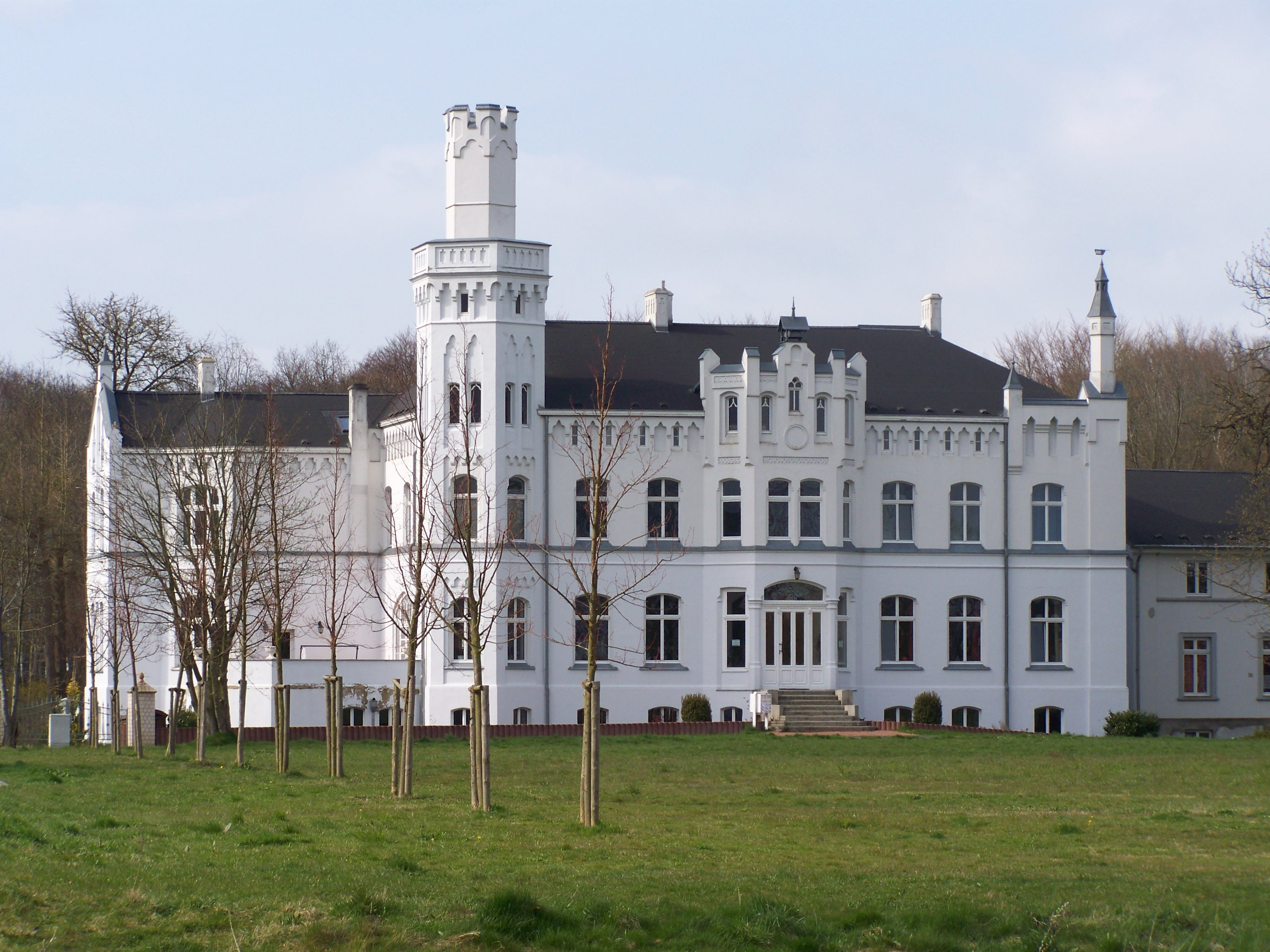
- Groß Kedingshagen Manor

Site information
- Type: Schloss

Location
- Location in Germany
- Coordinates: 54.338611°N 13.035278°E

Groß Kedingshagen Manor (German: Herrenhaus Groß Kedingshagen) is a manor house in Kramerhof municipality, Germany.

== History ==
The manor was built in 1860 by Johann Heinrich Bartels in a Gothic Revival style. When it became part of East Germany, the property was expropriated and served a number of purposes. Both the manor and park were neglected. Since 1997, it is privately owned.
