= Naval Protection Force (Germany) =

Naval Protection Force (Marineschutzkräfte)
- Active: 1 April 2005 - 31 March 2014
- Country: Germany
- Branch: German Navy
- Type: Marines
- Role: Force Protection
- Size: 496 troops
- Garrison/HQ: Eckernförde, Schleswig-Holstein

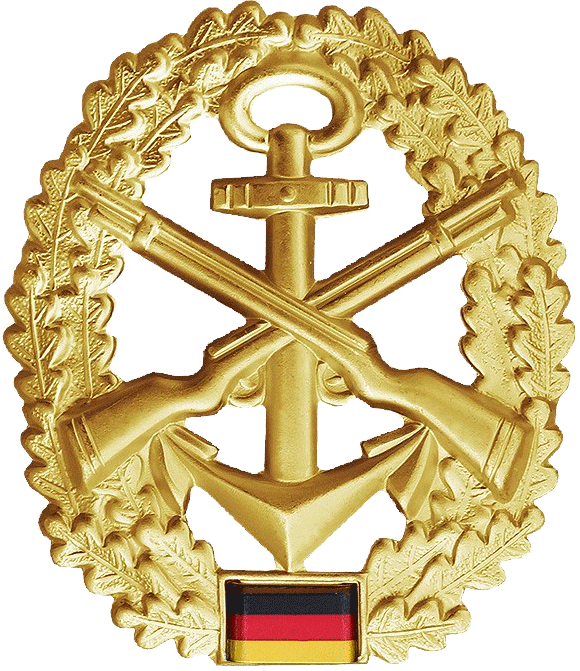
Beret badge

The Naval Protection Force (German: Marineschutzkräfte — MSK) was a marine unit of the German Navy. It had the size of a battalion and was part of the 1st Flotilla (Einsatzflottille 1). The MSK's headquarters was in Eckernförde on the Baltic Sea. Next to the Naval Special Deployment Force (Spezialisierte Einsatzkräfte Marine, SEKM), the Naval Protection Force were considered to be a marine element within the German Navy.

The Naval Protection Force battalion was organized into five units: one staff and support company, three naval protection companies and one military intelligence platoon.

== History ==
It was established on April 1, 2005, but traces its roots back to 1958, when the so-called Sea battalion (Seebataillon) was activated.

On 1 April 2014, the Naval Protection Force became an integral part of the re-formed Seebataillon (Naval Force Protection Battalion).

== Structure ==
The Naval Protection Force (Marineschutzkräfte) consisted out of around 500 soldiers and structured into a staff company, three combat companies plus a HUMINT platoon. Every company, led by a lieutenant (Kapitänleutnant, OF-2).

- Marineschutzkräfte (HQ)
  - Staff and Support Company (S1, S2, S3, S4, S6)
  - 1st Company
    - 1st platoon
    - 2nd platoon
    - 3rd platoon
    - 4th platoon
  - 2nd Company
    - 1st platoon
    - 2nd platoon
    - 3rd platoon
    - 4th platoon
  - 3rd Company
    - 1st platoon
    - 2nd platoon
    - 3rd platoon
    - 4th platoon
  - HUMINT platoon

== Deployments ==
Despite their short time of existence (8 years), the German Naval Protection Forces participated in a range of national and international Deployments.

=== International Deployments ===
- Afghanistan: 8th contingent of ISAF (one Infantry unit)
- Bosnia and Herzegovina: Deployment within EUFOR
- Djibouti: Deployment within Operation Enduring Freedom
- Horn of Africa: Deployment within Operation Atalanta
- Kosovo: Deployment within KFOR
- Lebanon: Mobile Protection Elements (MPE) for the protection of UNIFIL vessels
- Cyprus: Harbour Protection Element (HPE) in Limassol to secure the German operated UNIFIL base

=== National Deployments ===
- Protection of US-American facilities as part of the Host Nation Support in 2003
- Protection of US-American ships during the Kiel Week
- Protection of the Ammunition Supply Ship Westerwald during the mission- and training passage to South Africa and back

== Equipment ==
=== Personal Weapons ===
- Heckler & Koch G36, an Assault rifle
- Heckler & Koch MG4, a Light machine gun
- Rheinmetall MG3, a General-purpose machine gun
- M3M, a Heavy machine gun
- Heckler & Koch MP7, a Submachine gun
- MP2, a Submachine gun
- Heckler & Koch MP5, a Submachine gun
- P8, a Pistol
- G22, a Sniper rifle
- G82, a Sniper rifle
- Heckler & Koch G3, a Battle rifle
- G28, a Designated marksman rifle

=== Anti-Tank- / Anti-Structure Weapons ===
- Panzerfaust 3, an Anti-tank Rocket launcher
- Raytheon Fliegerfaust 2, a Man-portable air-defense systems
- MILAN, an Anti-tank missile

=== Vehicles ===
Name	Type	Picture
Dingo 1/2	Infantry mobility vehicle	
MAN trucks	Truck	
Mercedes-Benz Axor 1829 A 4x4	Truck	
Unimog trucks	Truck	
Mercedes-Benz 250 GD "Wolf"	Utility car	

== See also ==
- German commando frogmen
