= Einsatzflottille 1 =

1st Flotilla
- Einsatzflottille 1
- Coat of arms of the Einsatzflottille 1
- Active: June 29, 2006 to present
- Country: Germany
- Branch: German Navy
- Part of: Navy Command
- Garrison/HQ: Kiel, Schleswig-Holstein, Germany

Commanders
- Current commander: Flotilla admiral Christian Bock
- Notable commanders: Andreas Krause

Einsatzflottille 1 (EinsFltl 1 or EF 1) is one of the three brigade-level units of the German Navy, in addition to Einsatzflottille 2 and the Naval Air Command. It is based in Kiel, Schleswig-Holstein, and is under the head of the Navy Command, based in Rostock.

== History ==
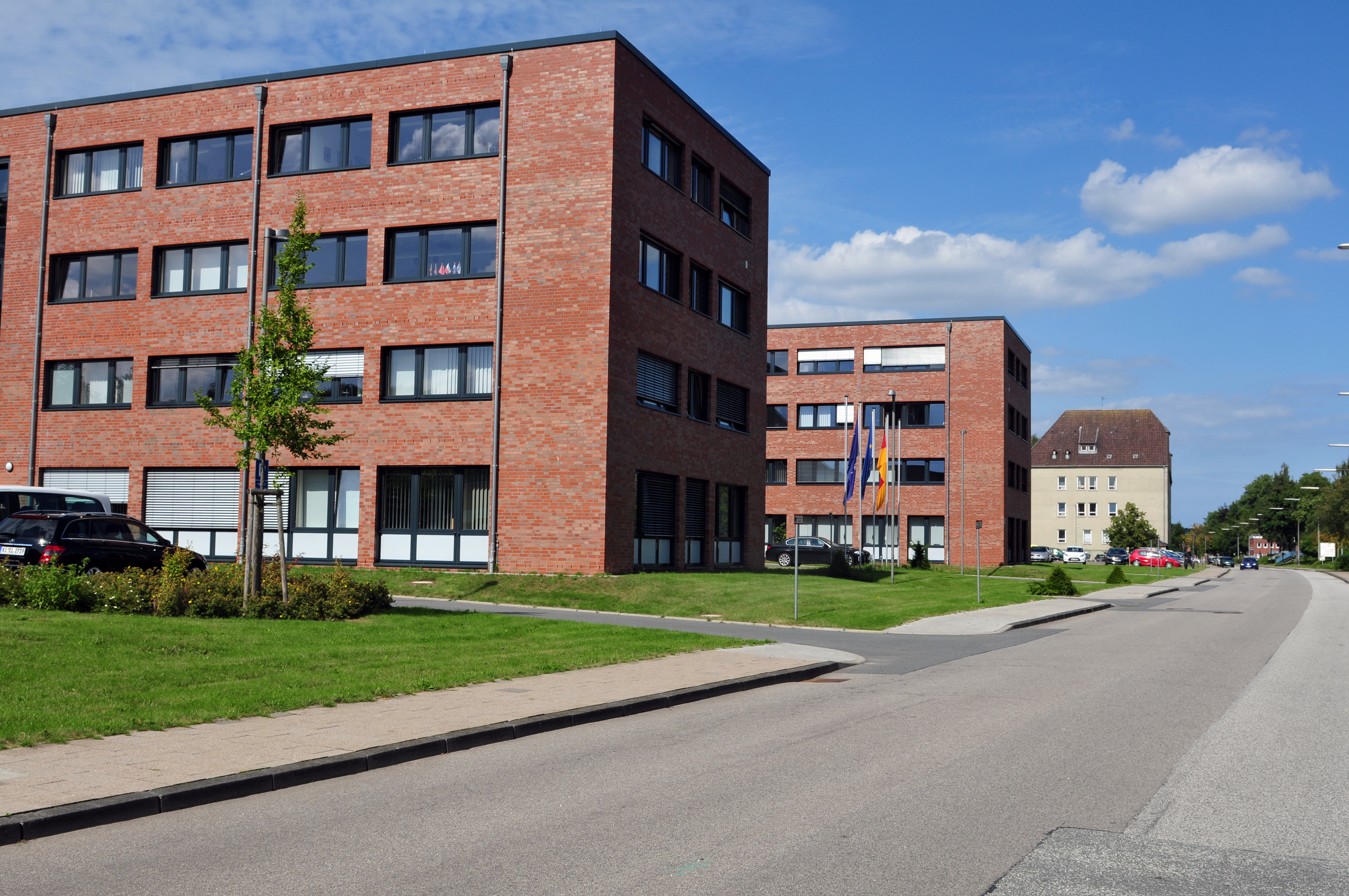
Staff building of Einsatzflottille 1

Einsatzflottille 1 was set up on 29 June 2006 as part of a major reorganization of the fleet. The Schnellbootflottille, the Ubootflottille, and the Flottille der Minenstreitkräfte were merged. This brought all fast attack craft, mine warfare ships, and submarines of the German Navy under one organisational umbrella. The five corvettes of the Braunschweig class were integrated into the flotilla from 2008 onward. In 2012 the EF 1 was stationed in the Baltic Sea. On 27 September 2016 the 5th Minensuchgeschwader, formerly part of Einsatzflottille 1, was decommissioned in Kiel, and was replaced by the Unterstützungsgeschwader (Support Squadron). On 16 November 2016 the 7. Schnellbootgeschwader in Warnemünde was also decommissioned.

== Subordinate units ==
=== 1st Corvette Squadron ===
The 1. Korvettengeschwader was created on 29 June 2006 with the commissioning of the first Braunschweig-class corvettes and is stationed at Hohe Düne Naval Base near Rostock-Warnemünde. Five additional corvettes built to the same (slightly modernised) design were ordered in 2017 and are planned to be commissioned from 2022 on, beginning with F265 Köln.

- Braunschweig-class (130) corvette
  - F260 Braunschweig
  - F261 Magdeburg
  - F262 Oldenburg
  - F263 Erfurt
  - F264 Ludwigshafen am Rhein

=== 3rd Mine Countermeasures Squadron ===
3. Minensuchgeschwader was raised on 15 October 1956 as 3rd Fast (schnelles) Mine Countermeasures Squadron in Wilhelmshaven and moved to Kiel from 1 August 1958 on. The squadron received its current name in February 1960. On 23 September 1992, the squadron was temporarily disbanded but reinstituted on 2 April 1996 in Olpenitz (today part of Kappeln). About a decade later, Olpenitz naval base was dissolved and the squadron returned to Kiel on 1 February 2006.

With the 1st and 5th mine countermeasures squadrons having been disbanded, the 3rd squadron now unites all mine warfare vessels of the German Navy.

- Frankenthal-class (332) minehunter
  - M1058 Fulda
  - M1059 Weilheim
  - M1061 Rottweil (fitted as diver support vessel)
  - M1062 Sulzbach-Rosenberg
  - M1063 Bad Bevensen
  - M1064 Grömitz
  - M1065 Dillingen
  - M1067 Bad Rappenau (fitted as diver support vessel)
  - M1068 Datteln
  - M1069 Homburg
- Ensdorf-class (352) minesweeper (mostly used for recruitment and training)
  - M 1090 Pegnitz
  - M 1098 Siegburg

=== Support Squadron ===
The Unterstützungsgeschwader commands five of the six Elbe-class tenders and is stationed in Kiel.

- Elbe-class (404) tender
  - A511 Elbe in Warnemünde
  - A512 Mosel in Kiel
  - A513 Rhein in Kiel
  - A514 Werra in Kiel
  - A516 Donau in Kiel

=== 1st Submarine Squadron ===
1. Ubootgeschwader and its units are stationed in Eckernförde where the squadron was created on 1 October 1961. It was part of the Ubootflotille (Submarine Flotilla) which was stationed in Eckernförde and also commanded the 1st squadrons sister unit, 3. Ubootgeschwader. Both units were dissolved in 2006, with the remaining submarines being transferred to 1st squadron.

- U-31-class (212 A) submarine
  - S182 U-31
  - S182 U-32
  - S183 U-33
  - S184 U-34
  - S185 U-35
  - S186 U-36
- Oste-class (423) fleet service ship
  - A50 Alster
  - A52 Oste
  - A53 Oker
- Elbe-class (404) tender
  - A515 Main (fitted for submarine tending)
- Submarine Training Centre

=== Naval Base Commands ===
- Naval Base Command Kiel
- Naval Base Command Eckernförde
- Naval Base Command Warnemünde

The commander of EF 1 also functions as director of the Centre of Excellence for Operations in Confined and Shallow Waters, COE CSW. The COE CSW is an organization founded to support NATO's transformation program. As part of the NATO Centres of Excellence programme the COE CSW was established in April 2007 and officially accredited by NATO on 26 May 2009. It is co-located with the staff of the Einsatzflottille 1.

== Commanders ==
N0.	Name	Start of command	End of command
7	Flotilla admiral Henning Faltin	15 September 2021	
6	Flotilla admiral Christian Bock	19 April 2018	15 September 2021
5	Flotilla admiral Jan Christian Kaack	24 April 2015	19 April 2018
4	Flotilla admiral Jean Martens	1 May 2013	24 April 2015
3	Flotilla admiral Thomas Jugel	1 April 2010	30 April 2013
2	Flotilla admiral Rainer Brinkmann	1 October 2008	31 March 2010
1.	Flotilla admiral Andreas Krause	29 June 2006	30 September 2008
