= Kramerhof =

- Municipality
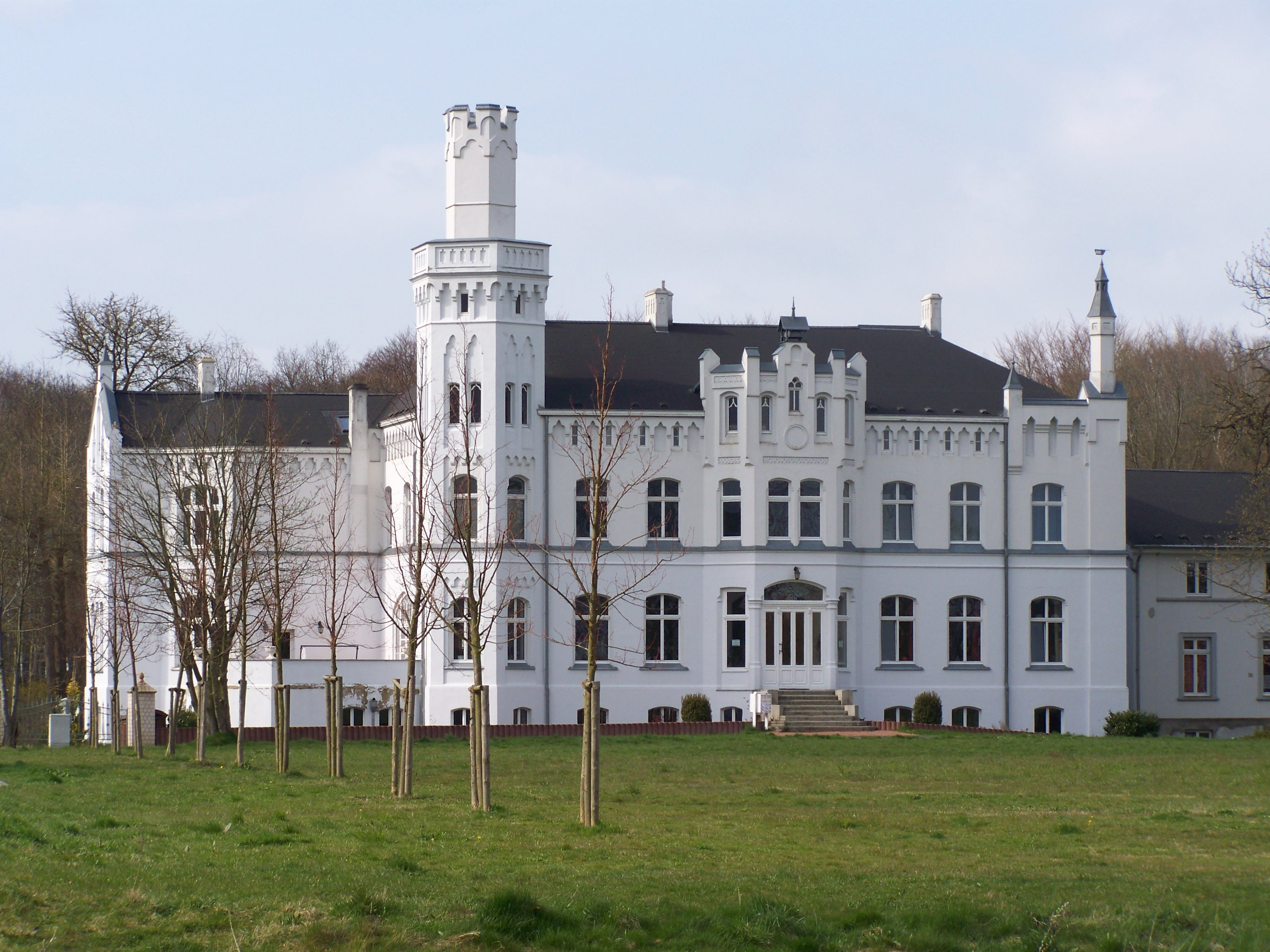
- Groß Kedingshagen Manor in Kramerhof

- Location of Kramerhof within Vorpommern-Rügen district
- Interactive map of Kramerhof
- Location within Germany Location within Mecklenburg-Vorpommern
- Coordinates: 54°21′N 13°03′E
- Country: Germany
- State: Mecklenburg-Vorpommern
- District: Vorpommern-Rügen
- Municipal assoc.: Altenpleen

Government
  - Mayor: Friedrich-Christian Seide

Area
  - Total: 17.90 km^{2} (6.91 sq mi)
- Elevation: 0.5 m (1.6 ft)

Population (2025-12-31)
  - Total: 1,855
  - Density: 103.6/km^{2} (268.4/sq mi)
- Time zone: UTC+01:00 (CET)
  - Summer (DST): UTC+02:00 (CEST)
- Postal codes: 18445
- Dialling codes: 03831
- Vehicle registration: NVP
- Website: www.altenpleen.de

Kramerhof is a municipality in the Vorpommern-Rügen district, in Mecklenburg-Vorpommern, Germany.

Groß Kedingshagen Manor lies in the municipality.
