= Parow, Germany =

Coordinates: 54°21′N 13°05′E

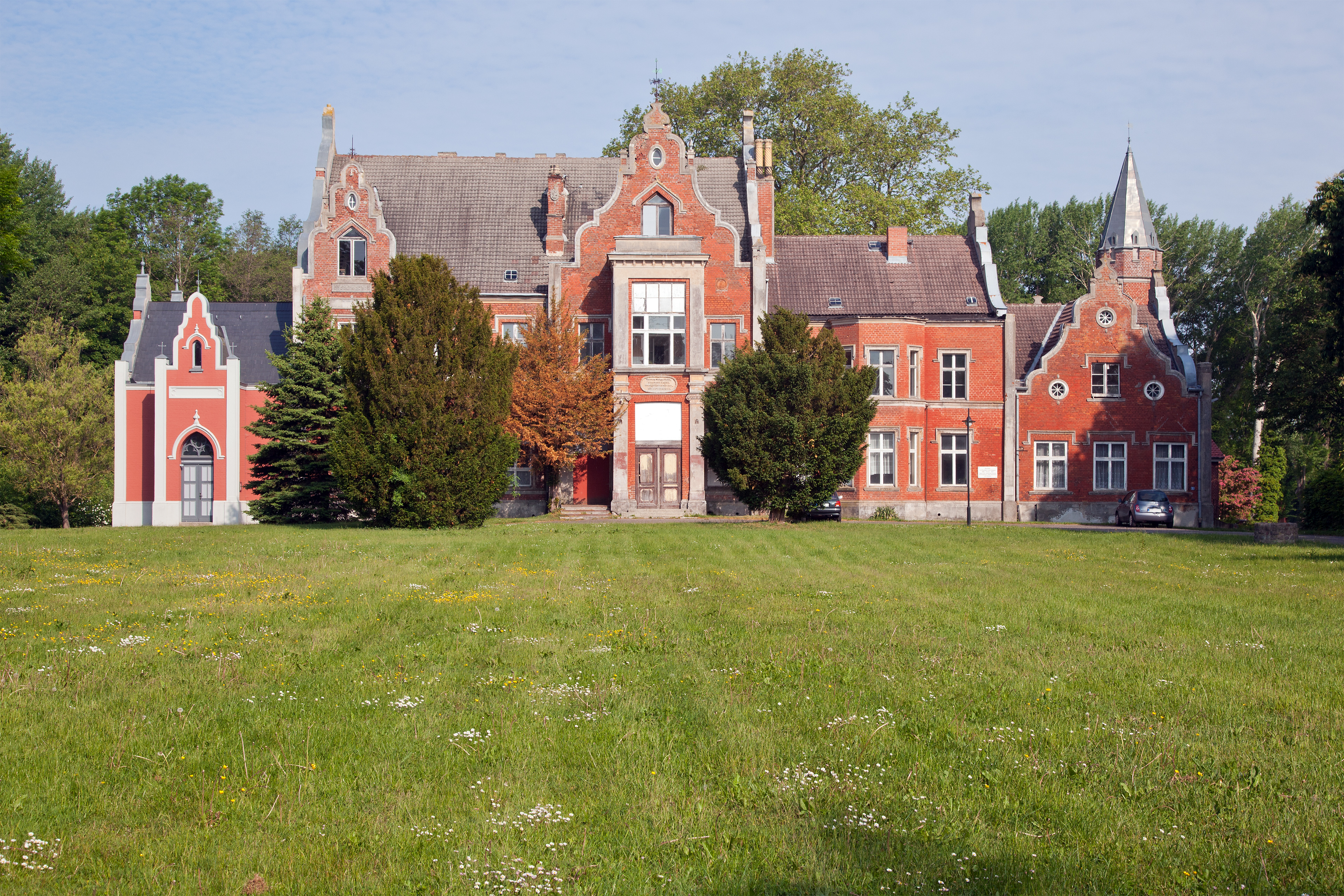
Parow Manor

Parow is a village a few miles north of Stralsund in Mecklenburg-Vorpommern, Germany. It is part of the municipality Kramerhof. First traces of settlements can be traced back to the Stone Age, based on findings of arrow heads, wedges and fireplaces. The German Navy's Engineering School (Marinetechnikschule) is at Parow. It moved from Kiel in 2002. The Minentaucher train there.
