= Bundeswehr Command and Staff College =

General Staff College of the German armed forces

Coordinates: 53.5613°N 9.83075°E

- Führungsakademie der Bundeswehr
- Motto: "Mens agitat molem" (English: "Mind moves matter")
- Type: Staff college and senior military academy of the German Armed Forces, the Bundeswehr
- Established: 15 May 1957 (15 October 1810 as Prussian Staff College)
- Location: Hamburg, Germany

The Bundeswehr Command and Staff College (German: Führungsakademie der Bundeswehr, FüAkBw) is the General Staff College (Senior Military Academy) of the German armed forces, the Bundeswehr, established in 1957 as the successor of the Prussian Military Academy, founded in 1810. Since 1958 it has been located in Hamburg. Its motto, Mens agitat molem, translates to "Mind moves matter". The leading educational institution of the German armed forces, the academy is internationally renowned for its excellence. The academy educates the future élite of not only the German armed forces but also of other member-states of the European Union and NATO.

Following German re-unification in 1989-1991, the Führungsakademie began training officers of the former East German National People's Army (German: Nationale Volksarmee (NVA)) in 1993.

== Education ==
The National General/Admiral Staff Officer Course (NGASOC) is a challenging, two-year course attended usually by 100 national and international participants from Army, Air Force, Navy, Central Medical Service, Armed Forces Logistic Services and Cyber-Information Services. It educates, teaches and qualifies future general/admiral staff military officers. A particular characteristic of the course is that it specifically focuses on the strategic and tactical aspects of war and educationally prepares officers for assignments as military leaders. It provides a comprehensive, multifaceted focus at the theater-strategic level across the military spectrum of Joint and land force operations during peace, crisis, and war. The program includes classroom studies of strategy, regional studies, joint operations, strategic leadership, and modern conflict. It intends to lecture officers in military arts and science and focuses on operational art and covers a variety of subjects, including military problem solving; military theory and history, military doctrine, operational planning; battle dynamics, operational theory and practice, contemporary military operations, and the application of national elements of power.

Complementary to the core modules of the course a master can be achieved (Master in Military Leadership and International Security/ Militärische Führung und Internationale Sicherheit).

Together with the Bundeswehr's Helmut Schmidt University it runs the German Institute for Defence and Strategic Studies (GIDS) located in the same facility.

The International General/Admiral Staff Officer Course (IGASOC) is a one-year course prepares international officers from non-NATO member states for general staff officer functions. As of 2014, about 2,400 officers from 120 nations, including 25% German students, have been educated at the IGASOC in Hamburg since its inception in 1962. The course body comprises three-quarters of international field-grade officers from non-NATO member states from all continents. One-quarter are of German field-grade officers in the rank of major and lieutenant colonel.

The Field Officer Basic Course (FOBC) is a four month course consisting of planning and organizational modules, public law and social sciences. For all line officers in the rank of major and lieutenant colonel in the Army, Air Force and Navy this course is the first part of their field-grade officer training.

The academy also offers a series of Certified Short Courses (Seminare) for active members of the German and international armed forces as well as the German Army Reserve on military field-grade officer-level. This is for all line officers in the rank from major until colonel. One course is exclusive for general and flag officers. These short courses are clustered in five so-called Training Fields and run between a few days up to three weeks on a full-time basis and include on-campus accommodation. Topics covered range from building military leadership competencies, complexity management skills, and the relationships and interactions between the state, security, and the military. Alongside military personnel.

== Alumni ==
Between 1962 and 1999, ca. 800 officers from more than 80 nations were educated at the academy. Many former students have been appointed to high military positions in their respective countries after their studies.

- Former commander of the Democratic Forces for the Liberation of Rwanda (FDLR) Sylvestre Mudacumura
- Pakistani General Khalid Shameem Wynne
- Pakistani Lieutenant General Ahmed Sharif Chaudhry
- Pakistani Major General Raza Muhammad
- Pakistani Major General Tariq Ghafoor
- Pakistani Major General Shaukat Iqbal
- Sri Lankan Major General Devinda Kalupahana
- Dutch Brigadier General Leanne van den Hoek
- Pakistani Commodore Shahid Azmat Wain
- Pakistan Brigadier Humair Mehmood Ghazi
- Norwegian Rear admiral Atle Torbjørn Karlsvik
- Norwegian Chief of Defence, General Harald Sunde
- Germany Commander Joint Force Command Brunssum, General Hans-Lothar Domröse
- Germany (former) Chairman of the NATO Military Committee, General Klaus Naumann
- Indonesian Armed Forces General Faisal Tanjung.
- Indonesian Air Force Air Marshal Herman Prayitno.
- Former Commander of Turkish Gendarmerie, Eşref Bitlis
- Former Chief of Army Staff of the Royal Nepalese Army, Satchit Rana
