= Centre of Excellence for Operations in Confined and Shallow Waters =

- Logo of the COE CSW
- Active: 26 May 2009 - present
- Countries: Germany Greece; Italy; Netherlands; Poland; Turkey United States
- Branch: Navy
- Type: NATO COE
- Size: Workforce: 30
- Garrison/HQ: Kiel Naval Base, Germany
- Motto: Nemo solus satis sapit! (No one alone is sufficiently wise!)
- Website: www.coecsw.org

Commanders
- Director: Rear Admiral (lh) (OF-6) DEU N Henning Faltin
- Executive Director: Captain (OF-5) DEU N Eike Wetters

The Centre of Excellence for Operations in Confined and Shallow Waters (COE CSW) is an international military organization founded to support NATO's transformation program. As part of the NATO Centres of Excellence programme the centre was established in April 2007 and officially accredited by NATO on 26 May 2009. It is co-located with the staff of the German Einsatzflottille 1 in Kiel whose commander is double-hatted as the centre Director.

== Mission ==
Confined and shallow waters are a cramped, congested and contested operational environment characterised by complexity, speed, disguise and a diversity of actors.

The Centre of Excellence contributes to doctrine, concepts and procedures for confined and shallow water activities. It conducts experiments and analyses, and provides competence for NATO initiatives, projects, exercises and operations. Furthermore, the centre works on a range of projects related to confined and shallow water-operations that are initiated by specific 'Requests for Support'.

Work at the centre is usually initiated through a Request for Support by a NATO entity or a participating state. The annual Programme of Work contains various 'Projects', which have a customer and defined product with a clear end date and end state, and a number of 'Activities', which cover the permanent support to NATO Transformation. The CoE also plans and conducts work-related events like conferences and workshops.

== Partners ==
Among the military and civilian partners of the centre are:

- The Allied Maritime Command (MARCOM) in Northwood, UK
- The Combined Joint Operations from the Sea Center of Excellence in Norfolk, USA
- The Naval Mine Warfare COE in Ostend, Belgium
- The Maritime Security COE in Aksaz, Turkey
- The Centre for Maritime Research and Experimentation (CMRE) in La Spezia, Italy
- The Bundeswehr Technical Centre for Ships and Naval Weapons (WTD 71) in Eckernförde, Germany (de:Wehrtechnische Dienststelle für Schiffe und Marinewaffen, Maritime Technologie und Forschung)
- The Sea Surveillance Cooperation Baltic Sea (SUCBAS)
- The Institute for Security Policy Kiel (ISPK) in Kiel, Germany
- Defence industry and maritime commerce

== Participants ==
Germany acts as 'Framework Nation' for the centre. It provides the infrastructure, basic services, financial contributions and core staff personnel as well as a number of "Subject Matter Experts". Upon the foundation of the centre, Greece, the Netherlands, and Turkey acceded as sponsoring nations providing "Subject Matter Experts" and financial contributions. In 2009 Poland and in 2014 Italy also joined as Sponsoring Nations. NATO COEs are open for NATO partners in terms of providing Subject Matter Expertise and financial contributions. In 2011, COE CSW welcomed Finland, the first "Contributing Nation" to a NATO COE. Finally, the United States of America is participating in the COE CSW through the 'Personnel Exchange Program' with the German Navy. From 2011 to 2019, the Republic of Finland supported the COE CSW, being the first Contributing Partner to a NATO COE ever.

== Structure ==
The centre's supervisory board is the 'Steering Committee' composed of a chairman (allocated by the Framework Nation but, without a vote) and a representative of each participating nation (each having one vote). The Steering Committee monitors the work progress and approves the annual report and budget. The centre is led by a Director from the German Navy at the rank of Flotilla Admiral (NATO OF-6, equivalent to a Royal Navy Commodore) who at the same time is double-hatted as commander of the German Flotilla 1. The Executive Director, a navy captain, is responsible for daily operations. The staff of Flotilla 1 assists with administrative issues such as security and logistics. In 2015, the centre implemented a new working structure. Consisting of three branches, the structure clearly differentiates between productive work and supporting management functions:

- Concept and Doctrine Development (CD) - production
- Training and Analysis (TA) - production
- Staff Organisation and External Relations (SE) - management

The IT and AS (Administrative Support) sections are allocated to the Staff Organisation and External Relations branch, the Financial Control section is directly subordinated to the Executive Director.

== Literature ==
- Buss, Heinz Georg: COE CSW - Avantgarde im NATO-Transformationsprozess; in: Marineforum 11-2015 p. 4 ff
- Buss, Heinz Georg; Riewesell, Stefan: Maritime C-IED and Harbour Protection: A Joint Effort; in: The Transformer Fall 2013 Vol 9 Issue 2 p. 18
- Stricker, Hans-Joachim: Centre of Excellence for Operations in Confined and Shallow Waters COE CSW - Das COE als Ausdruck unserer besonderen nationalen Fähigkeiten im Bündnis; in: Marineforum 6-2007 p. 3 f
- Weber, Fritz-Rudolf: Centre of Excellence for Operations in Confined and Shallow Waters - Think Tank für die NATO; in: Marineforum 1/2-2010 p. 11 ff
- Wiedemann, Jan: COE CSW celebrates fifth anniversary; in: NAVAL FORCES III/2014 p. 90 f
- Wilson, Brian: Five maritime security developments that will resonate for a generation; in: Harvard Law School National Security Journal; 2015-03-11
