= Navy Office (Germany) =

- German: Marineamt
- Marineamt insignia
- Active: 1 October 1956–1 October 2012
- Country: Germany
- Branch: German Navy
- Type: High command authority
- Size: about 4,500
- Headquarters: Rostock

Commanders
- Notable commanders: Günter Kuhnke; Günter Luther; Otto Ites; Axel Schimpf

The Navy Office (German: Marineamt) was a higher command within the German Navy, founded in 1965 and disestablished in 2012. Its original responsibility was training, education and armaments planning for the German Navy. It was situated at Wilhelmshaven until it was relocated to Rostock after German reunification in 1990. In 2001 it was merged with the former Navy Support Command, expanding its responsibilities to include naval logistics.

The Marineamt was commanded by a Rear Admiral directly subordinate to the Chief of the Naval Staff in the Ministry of Defence. It was the superior command for all naval schools and bases as well as of some research and development institutions.

In 2012, the Marineamt was combined with the Naval Staff in the Ministry of Defence in Bonn and Fleet Command in Glücksburg to form Navy Command (Marinekommando), located in Rostock.

== See also ==
- List of naval ships of Germany
