= German Navy =

Maritime warfare branch of Germany's military

- Marine
- Founded: 2 January 1956; 70 years ago
- Country: Germany
- Type: Navy
- Size: 15,531 personnel (August 2024); 65 ships 56 aircraft
- Part of: Bundeswehr
- Headquarters of the German Navy: Rostock (Navy Command)
- Mottos: Wir. Dienen. Deutschland. (We. Serve. Germany.)
- March: "Kameraden auf See"
- Anniversaries: 14 June
- Engagements: Operation Sharp Guard (1993–96); Operation Enduring Freedom; Combined Task Force 150 (2002–present); Operation Active Endeavour; UNIFIL II; Operation ATALANTA
- Website: marine.de

Commanders
- Inspector of the Navy: Vice Admiral Wilhelm Tobias Abry
- Deputy Inspector of the Navy: Vice Admiral Axel Deertz
- Chief of Staff: Rear Admiral Frank Martin Lenski
- Notable commanders: Friedrich Ruge; Günter Luther

Insignia
- Ensign

The German Navy (German: Deutsche Marine, pronounced [ˈdɔʏtʃə maˈʁiːnə]) is part of the unified Bundeswehr (Federal Defense), the German Armed Forces. The German Navy was originally known as the Bundesmarine (Federal Navy) from 1956 to 1995, when Deutsche Marine (German Navy) became the official name with respect to the 1990 incorporation of the East German Volksmarine (People's Navy). It is deeply integrated into the NATO alliance. Its primary mission is protection of Germany's territorial waters and maritime infrastructure as well as sea lines of communication. Apart from this, the German Navy participates in peacekeeping operations, and renders humanitarian assistance and disaster relief. It also participates in anti-piracy operations.

== History ==
German Naval history has its roots in the naval history of the Holy Roman Empire, to which the Dutch Navy and even the Spanish Navy once belonged. Proper German language early maritime history is represented by the Hanseatic League and the Brandenburg Navy, later Prussian Navy.

The modern German Navy traces its roots back to the Reichsflotte (Imperial Fleet) of the revolutionary era of 1848–52. The Reichsflotte was the first German navy to sail under the black-red-gold flag. Founded on 14 June 1848 by the orders of the democratically elected Frankfurt Parliament, the Reichsflotte's brief existence ended with the failure of the revolution and it was disbanded on 2 April 1852; thus, the modern day navy celebrates its birthday on 14 June.

The small Prussian Navy evolved in 1867 into the North German Federal Navy, which was mainly for coast defence. It became the Imperial German Navy in 1871. From 1919 to 1935, only a small Reichsmarine was permitted. Under Nazi Germany, it was transformed into the Kriegsmarine, which was disbanded in 1945 after the end of World War II in Europe.

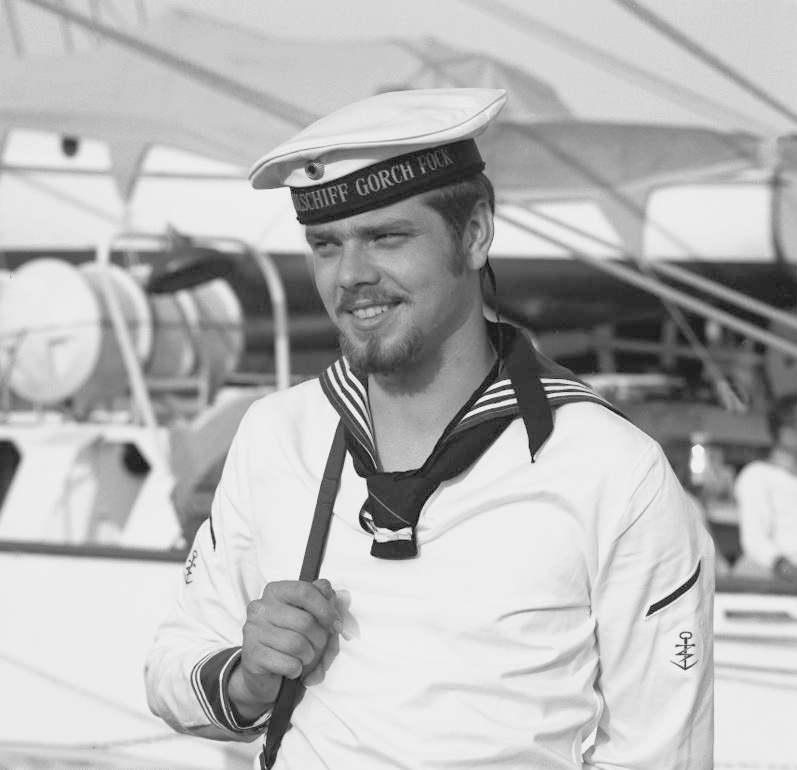
A sailor of the West German navy during the 1970s

Between May 1945 and 1956, the German Mine Sweeping Administration and its successor organizations, made up of former Kriegsmarine members, became something of a transition stage for the German navy, allowing the future Marine to draw on recently experienced personnel upon its formation. Also, from 1949 to 1952 the United States Navy maintained the Naval Historical Team in Bremerhaven. This group of former Kriegsmarine officers acting as historical and tactical consultants to the Americans, was significant in establishing a German element in the NATO senior naval staff. In 1956, with West Germany's accession to NATO, the Bundesmarine (Federal Navy), as the navy was known colloquially, was formally established. In the same year the East German Volkspolizei See (literally People's Police Sea) became the Volksmarine (People's Navy). During the Cold War all of the German Navy's combat vessels were assigned to NATO's Allied Forces Baltic Approaches's naval command NAVBALTAP.

With the accession of former East Germany's states to the Federal Republic of Germany in 1990 the Volksmarine along with the whole National People's Army became part of the Bundeswehr. Since 1995 the name German Navy is used in international context, while the official name since 1956 remains Marine without any additions. As of August 2024, the strength of the navy is 15,531 men and women.

A number of naval forces have operated in different periods. See

- Preußische Marine (Prussian Navy), 1701–1867
- Reichsflotte (Fleet of the Realm), 1848–52
- North German Federal Navy, 1867–71
- Imperial German Navy (Kaiserliche Marine), 1871–1919
- Reichsmarine, 1919–35
- Kriegsmarine, 1935–45
- German Mine Sweeping Administration, 1945–48
- Volksmarine, the navy of East Germany (GDR) 1956–90
- Marine, 1956–present (Bundesmarine, colloquially)

== Current operations ==
German warships permanently participate in all four NATO Maritime Groups. The German Navy is also engaged in operations against international terrorism such as Operation Enduring Freedom and NATO Operation Active Endeavour.

Presently the largest operation the German Navy is participating in is UNIFIL off the coast of Lebanon. The German contribution to this operation is two frigates, four fast attack craft, and two auxiliary vessels. The naval component of UNIFIL has been under German command.

The navy operates a number of development and testing installations as part of an inter-service and international network. Among these is the Centre of Excellence for Operations in Confined and Shallow Waters (COE CSW), an affiliated centre of Allied Command Transformation. The COE CSW was established in April 2007 and officially accredited by NATO on 26 May 2009. It is co-located with the staff of the German Flotilla 1 in Kiel whose Commander is double-hatted as Director, COE CSW.

== Equipment ==
=== Ships and submarines ===
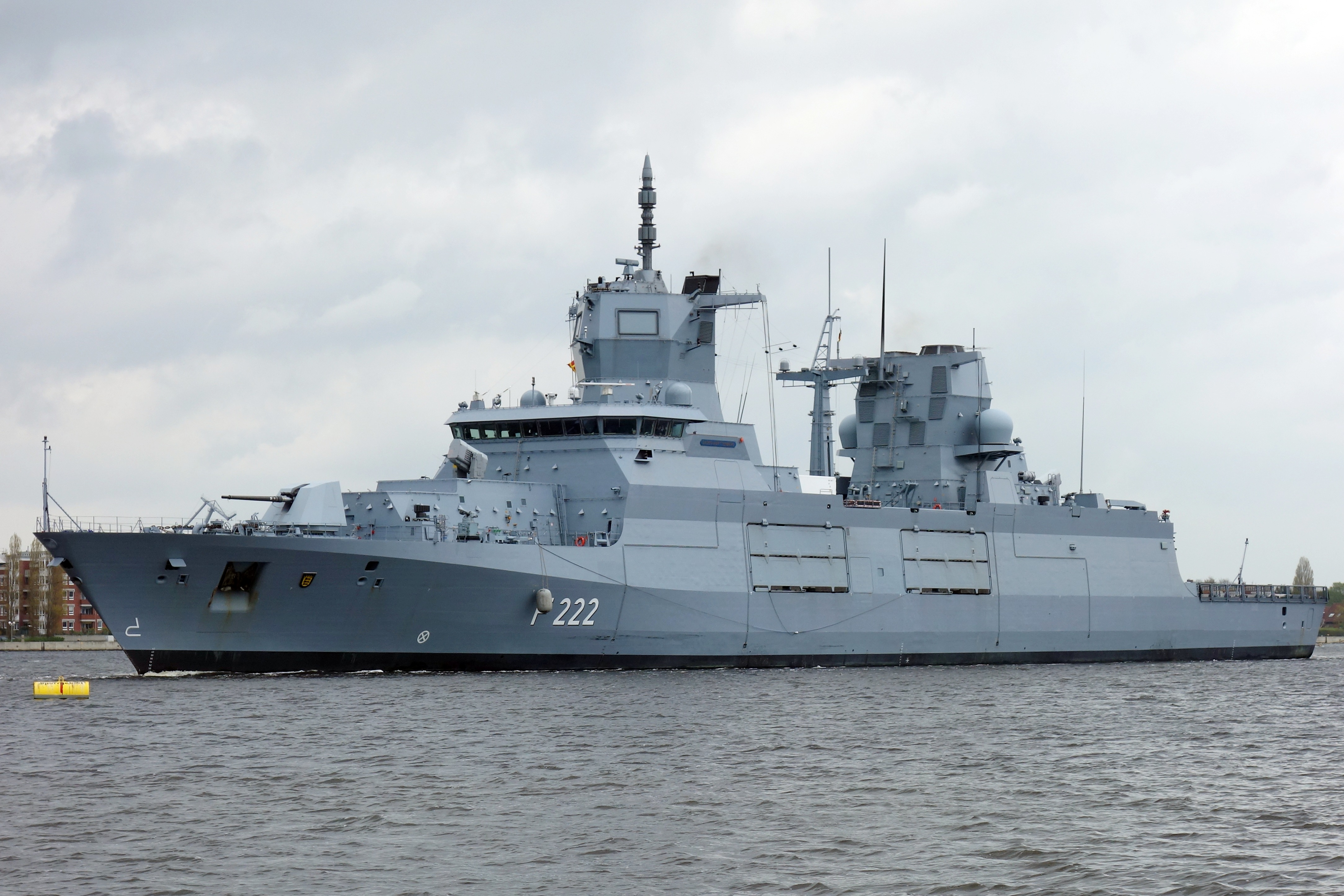
A Baden-Württemberg-class frigate in Wilhelmshaven in April 2017

In total, there are about 65 commissioned ships in the German Navy, including; 11 frigates, 5 corvettes, 2 minesweepers, 10 minehunters, 6 submarines, 11 replenishment ships and 20 miscellaneous auxiliary vessels. The displacement of the navy is 220,000 tonnes.

Ships of the German Navy include:

- 4 Baden-Württemberg-class frigates F125
- 3 Sachsen-class frigates F124
- 4 Brandenburg-class frigates F123
- 5 K130 Braunschweig class corvettes (5 additional units in production, planned commissioning from 2025)
- 6 Type 212 submarines and additional 212 CD class submarines

In addition, the German Navy and the Royal Netherlands Navy are in cooperation in the "Ark Project". This agreement made the Ark Project responsible for the strategic sealift of German armed forces where the full-time charter of three roll-on-roll-off cargo and troop ships are ready for deployments. In addition, these ships are also kept available for the use of the other European NATO countries. The three vessels have a combined displacement of 60,000 tonnes. Including these ships, the total ships' displacement available to the Deutsche Marine is 280,000 tonnes.

Procurement of joint support ships (either two JSS800 for an amphibious group of 800 soldiers, or three smaller JSS400), was planned during the 1995–2010 period but the programme appears now to have been abandoned, not having been mentioned in two recent defence reviews. The larger ships would have been tasked for strategic troop transport and amphibious operations, and were to displace 27,000 to 30,000 tons for 800 soldiers.

=== Aircraft ===
The naval air arm of the German Navy is called the Marinefliegerkommando. The Marinefliegerkommando operates 56 aircraft, in May 2021 it was announced that the German Navy intended to replace the P-3C aircraft with Boeing P-8 Poseidon MPA aircraft through a FMS agreement from 2025 onwards.

=== Other equipment ===
==== Vehicles of the German Navy ====
Model	Image	Origin	Type	Quantity	Notes
Mobile cranes
Grove GMK 4080-3		United States	Mobile crane	5 (7 additional for the Joint Support Service)	5 used by the German Navy, 7 to be used by the Joint Support Service. Specifications: 70 tons lifting capacity; boom length is 51 meters
Merlo Roto 50.35		Germany	Telescopic handler	—	—

== Structure ==
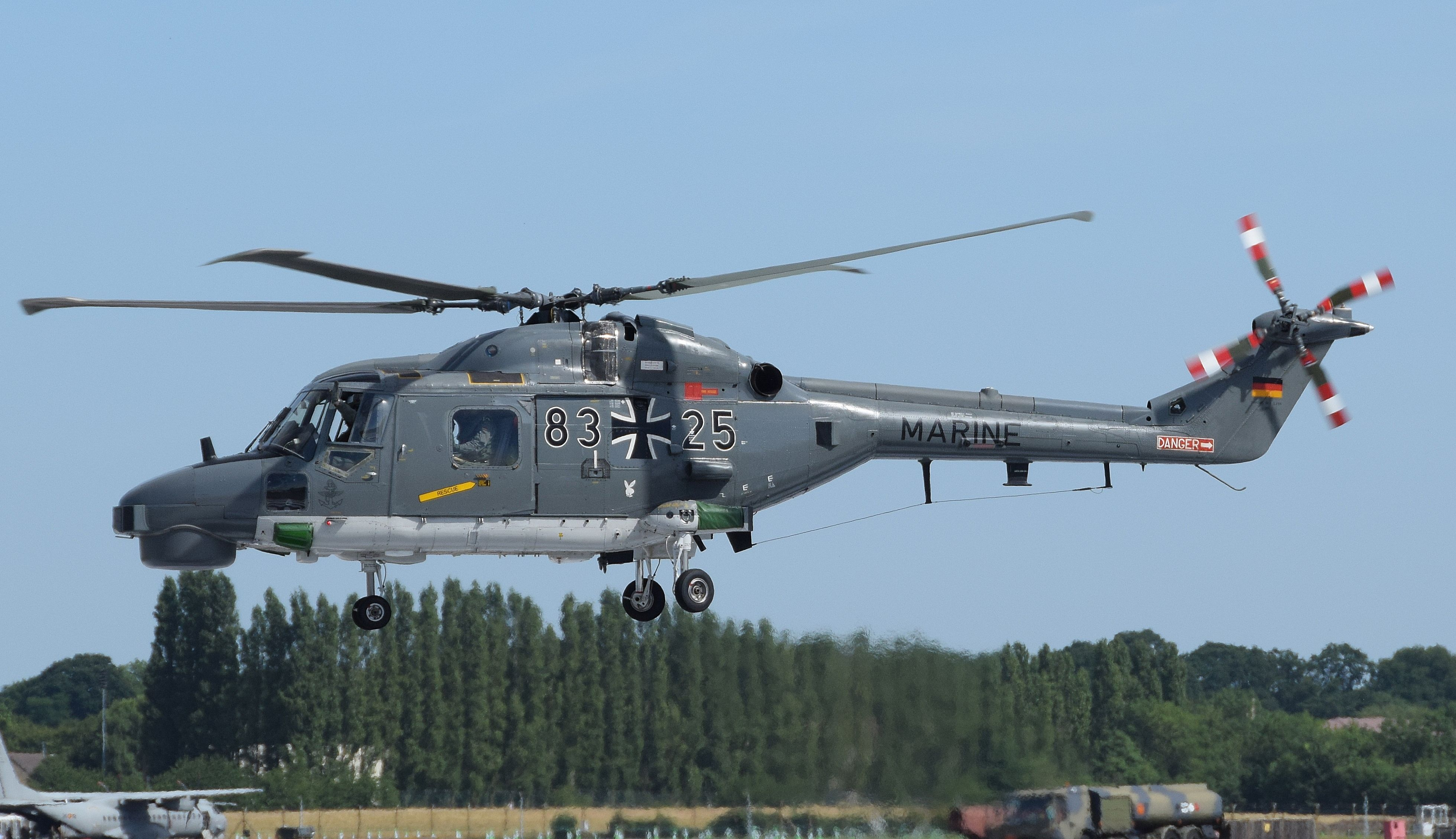
Westland WG-13 Super Lynx Mk88a of the German Navy

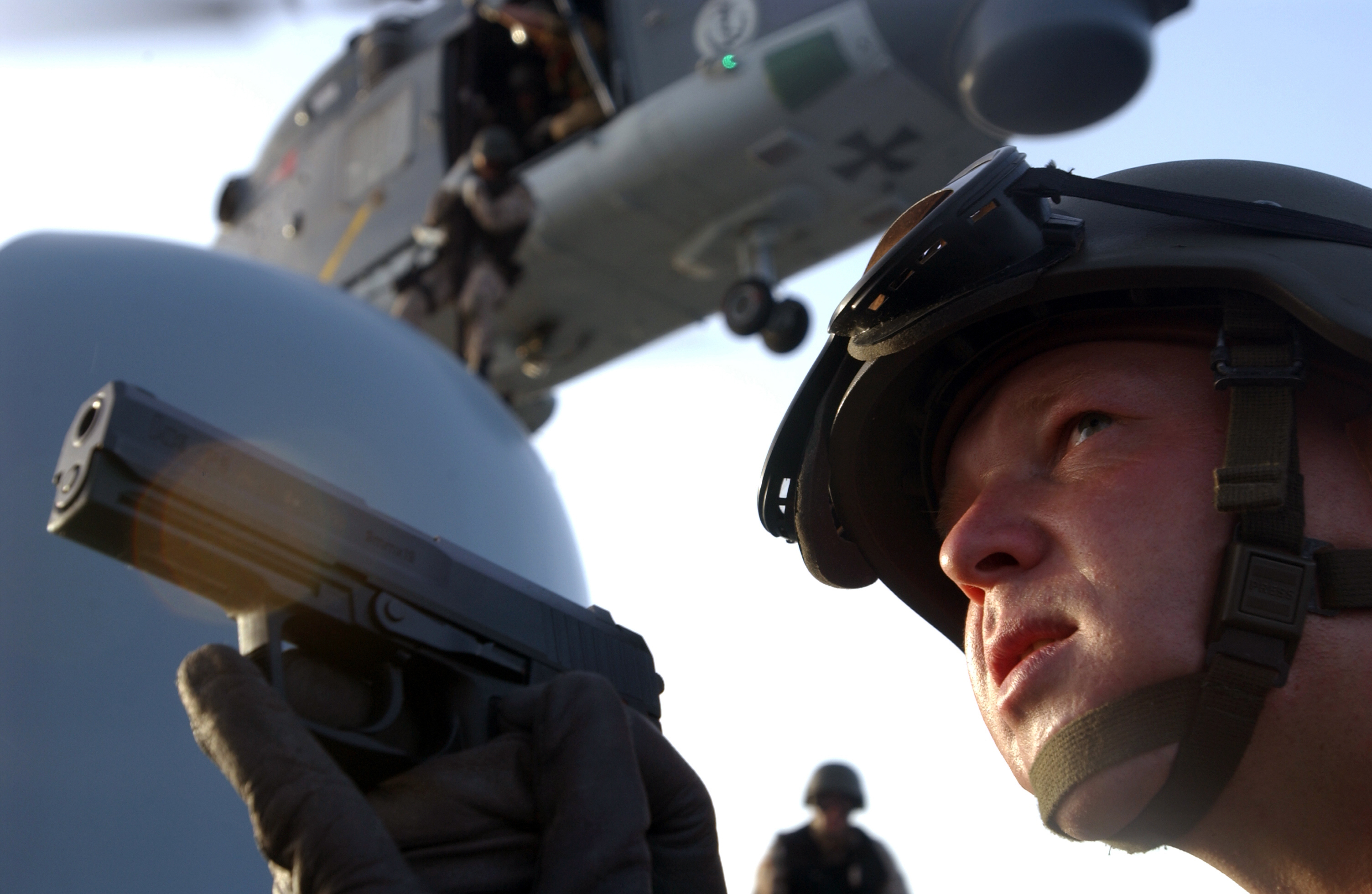
A German Navy boarding team member assigned to the frigate Augsburg (F213) provides security with a P8 pistol for the remainder of his team as they board a local cargo hold by fast rope to conduct a search of the vessel.

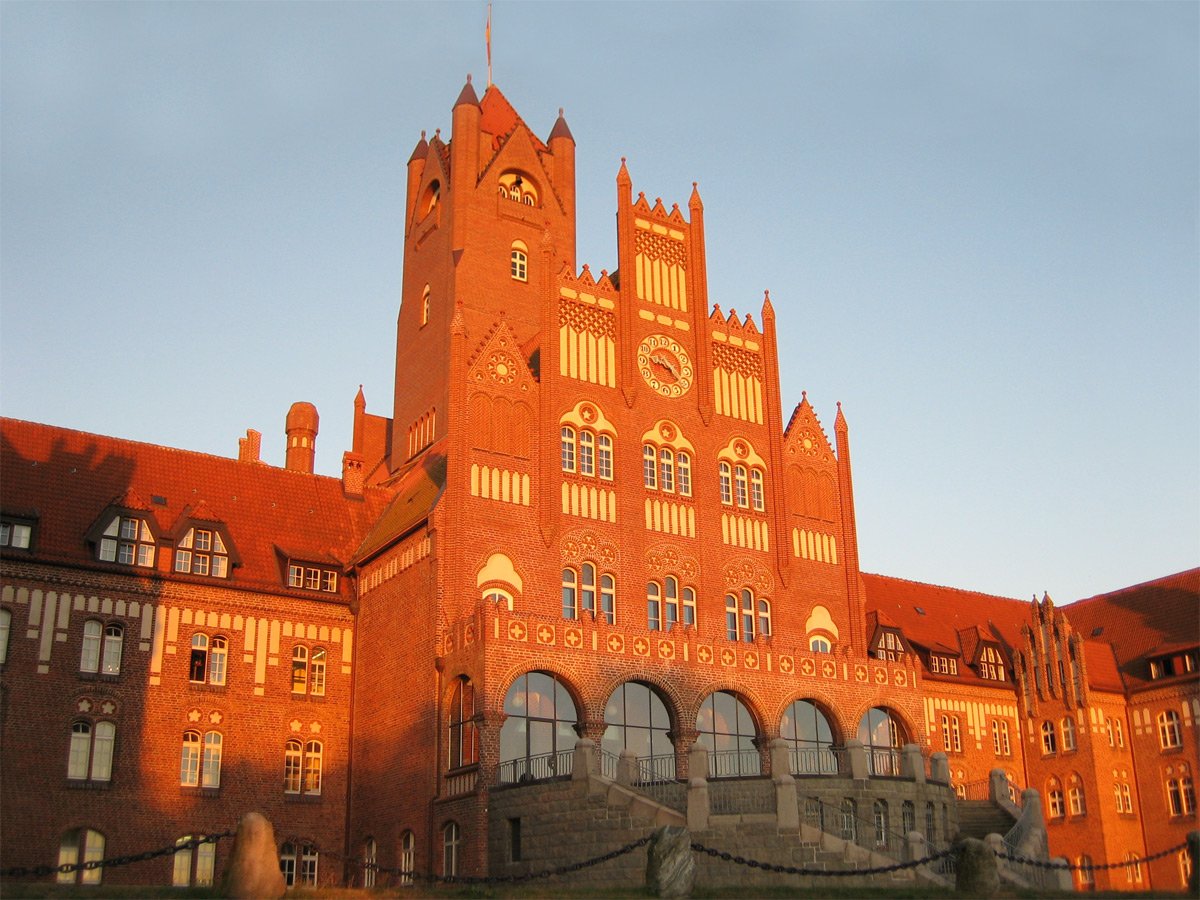
Mürwik Naval School

The German Navy is commanded by the Inspector of the Navy (Inspekteur der Marine) supported by the Navy Command (Marinekommando) in Rostock.

=== Formations ===
- Navy Command (Marinekommando), Rostock
  - Einsatzflottille 1 (HQ Kiel)
    - 1st Corvette Squadron (1. Korvettengeschwader), Warnemünde
    - 1st Submarine Squadron (1. Ubootgeschwader), Eckernförde
    - Submarine Training Centre (Ausbildungszentrum Unterseeboote), Eckernförde
    - 3rd Minesweeping Squadron (3. Minensuchgeschwader), Kiel
    - Sea Battalion, Eckernförde
    - Kommando Spezialkräfte Marine, Eckernförde
    - Naval Base Command Kiel (Marinestützpunktkommando Kiel)
    - Naval Base Command Eckernförde
    - Naval Base Command Warnemünde
  - Einsatzflottille 2, Wilhelmshaven
    - HQ 2nd Flotilla
    - 2nd Frigate Squadron (2. Fregattengeschwader), Wilhelmshaven
    - 4th Frigate Squadron (4. Fregattengeschwader), Wilhelmshaven
    - Auxiliary Squadron (Trossgeschwader), Wilhelmshaven
    - Naval Base Command Wilhelmshaven
  - Naval Aviation Command (Marinefliegerkommando), Nordholz
    - Naval Air Wing 3 (Marinefliegergeschwader 3), Nordholz
    - Naval Air Wing 5 (Marinefliegergeschwader 5), Nordholz
  - Naval Support Command (Marineunterstützungskommando – MUKdo)
  - Naval Medical Institute (Schiffahrtsmedizinisches Institut), Kiel
  - Naval Academy (Marineschule Mürwik), Flensburg
  - Naval Petty Officer School (Marineunteroffiziersschule), Plön
  - Naval Engineering School (Marinetechnikschule), Parow, near Stralsund
  - Naval Operations School (Marineoperationsschule), Bremerhaven
  - Naval Damage Control Training Centre (Ausbildungszentrum für Schiffssicherung), Neustadt in Holstein

== Ranks ==
=== Officers ===
NATO code	OF-10	OF-9	OF-8	OF-7	OF-6	OF-5	OF-4	OF-3	OF-2		OF-1
German Navy
German Navy		Admiral	Vizeadmiral	Konteradmiral	Flottillenadmiral	Kapitän zur See	Fregattenkapitän	Korvettenkapitän	Stabskapitänleutnant	Kapitänleutnant	Oberleutnant zur See	Leutnant zur See

=== Petty officers and enlisted seamen ===
NATO code	OR-9	OR-8	OR-7	OR-6		OR-5		OR-4				OR-3		OR-2	OR-1
German Navy															No insignia
German Navy	Oberstabsbootsmann	Stabsbootsmann	Hauptbootsmann	Oberbootsmann	Bootsmann	Obermaat	Maat	Stabskorporal	Korporal	Oberstabsgefreiter	Stabsgefreiter	Hauptgefreiter	Obergefreiter	Gefreiter	Matrose
German Navy (Officer designate)
German Navy (Officer designate)			Oberfähnrich zur See	Fähnrich zur See		Seekadett

== Radio and communication stations ==
- DHO38
- DHJ58
- DHJ59

== Future developments ==
=== Planned investments ===
As of August 2025, Germany plans to invest €350 billion in new equipment through 2041. These investments come on top of the special fund of €100 billion. This includes the following estimated budgets:

- German Navy:
  - Naval vessels and other equipment: €36.6 billion
- German Army:
  - Communications equipment: €15.9 billion
  - Vehicles and accessories: €20.8 billion
  - Combat vehicles: €52.5 billion
  - Munitions: €70.3 billion
  - Field and logistics material: €20.9 billion
- German Air Force:
  - Aircraft and missiles: €34.2 billion
  - Satellite communications: €13.3 billion

=== Equipment on order ===
- Three Type 424 Electronic reconnaissance ships ordered in July 2023 to replace the Type 423 Oste. It will be delivered from 2029 to 2031. The cost of this project is €3.26 billion, and the financing comes from the regular defence budget.
- The German government has announced the selection in January 2020 and contracting in June 2020 of Damen Group as the main contractor, together with partners Blohm+Voss and Thales, for supplying four Multi-Purpose Combat Ship F126 frigates to the German Navy with an additional Order for 2 ships in 2024. The ships will be built at Blohm + Voss shipyard in Hamburg and at other shipyard locations of the North German Lürssen Group. The project was cancelled on 24 June 2026 and replaced with the procurement of eight MEKO A-200 DEU-class frigates (F128) instead.
- Two further-developed Type 212 submarines with significant advancements (Known as Type 212CD) will be designed & procured with the Royal Norwegian Navy in the next decade. The contract was signed in July 2021, where according to the official statement the "NDMA and its German counterparts in the Bundesamt für Ausrüstung, Informationstechnik und Nutzung der Bundeswehr (BAAINBw) will acquire six new submarines – four Norwegian (in June 2024 increased to six) and two German – as well as Naval Strike Missiles for use on both German and Norwegian naval vessels." According to ThyssenKrupp Marine Systems the delivery of the two boats for the German Navy is scheduled for 2032 and 2034.
- Five additional Braunschweig-class corvettes are ordered and will be delivered 2020–2023.
- NH90 NFH 'Sea Tiger' Helicopters ordered to replace Lynx in ASW/AsuW role, originally ordered by the German Army as NH90 TTH variant with deliveries planned from 2025 onwards. Up to 31 could be ordered.
- Integration of the German Navy Marines (Seebataillon) in the Netherlands Marine Corps and use of the Amphibious ships of the Royal Netherlands Navy such as the joint support ship HNLMS Karel Doorman (A833) as of 2016.

== See also ==
- German Navy:
  - List of active German Navy ships
  - List of active aircraft of the German Navy
  - List of active weapons of the German Navy
  - List of ship classes of the Bundesmarine and Deutsche Marine
  - List of ships of the German navies
  - Kommando Spezialkräfte Marine (German Navy special forces)
  - List of admirals of the German Navy
  - German commando frogmen
  - Marineamt
  - Marine-Regatta-Verein
  - U-boat
  - Volksmarine
- German Army:
  - List of modern equipment of the German Army
- German Air Force:
  - List of active equipment of the German Air Force
- German Army equipment pages in German:
  - List of small arms of the Bundeswehr
  - List of Bundeswehr ammunition
  - List of wheeled vehicles of the Bundeswehr
  - List of tracked vehicles of the Bundeswehr
  - List of aircraft of the Bundeswehr
