= Navy Command (Germany) =

Navy Command — XXXX —
- Marinekommando (MarKdo)
- Insignia
- Active: 1 October 2012
- Country: Germany
- Branch: German Navy
- Type: High command
- Garrison/HQ: Rostock

Commanders
- Inspector of the Navy: Vice Admiral Jan Christian Kaack
- Deputy Inspector of the Navy: Vice Admiral Rainer Brinkmann
- Chief of Staff: Rear Admiral Frank Martin Lenski

The Navy Command (German: Marinekommando, MarKdo) is the high command of the German Navy of the Bundeswehr as well as the staff of the Inspector of the Navy, the Navy's highest commander. It was formed in 2012, as a merger of the Navy Office (Marineamt), Naval Staff (Führungsstab der Marine), and Fleet Command (Flottenkommando), as part of a larger reorganization of the Bundeswehr. It is based in Rostock, Mecklenburg-Vorpommern.

== Organisation ==
The Navy Command is led by the Inspector of the Navy ranked Vice admiral, he is assisted by the Deputy Inspector of the Navy and Commander of the Fleet, as well as the Navy Commands Chief of Staff.

The command is structured in five departments. The forces of the Navy are assigned to the different departments heads.

- Operations
  - Einsatzflottille 1
  - Einsatzflottille 2
  - Marinefliegerkommando
- Planning
- Personnel, Training and Organization
  - Schools of the Navy
- Operations Support
  - Marineunterstützungskommando
- Navy Medical Service
  - Maritime Medicine Institute of the Navy

and the command staff.
