= Plön Evolution Path =

Educational public works project

Coordinates: 54.156667°N 10.417222°E

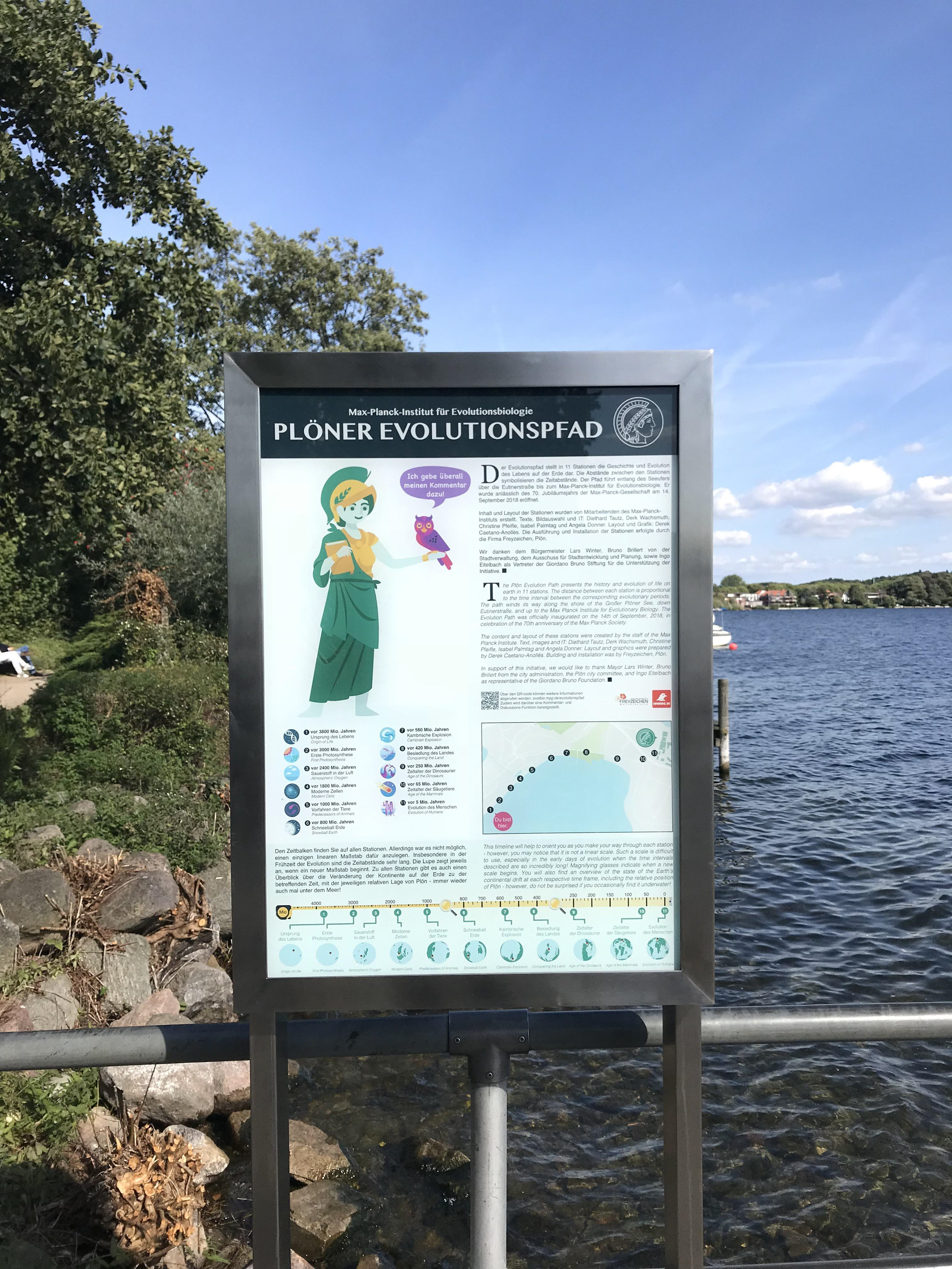
The Evolution Path begins at the Plön Pier in Plön, Germany. The Großer Plöner See can be seen in the background.

The Max Planck Institute for Evolutionary Biology's Plön Evolution Path ("Plöner Evolutionspfad", German pronunciation: [ˈpløːnɐ evoluˈt͡si̯oːns pfaːt]) is an educational public works project that presents the history and evolution of life on Earth. It is one of a number of Evolution Paths in Germany.

Located in Plön, Germany, the Evolution Path is composed of 11 dual-language English/German stations extending around the Großer Plöner See. The path extends 1.3 km in total, starting at the Plön Market Bridge (Schiffsanlegestelle Plön) that also serves as the start of the Plön Planet Walk, and makes its way to the Max Planck Institute for Evolutionary Biology.

From beginning to end, the Evolution Path describes events during evolutionary history, beginning with the origin of life (3.8 million years ago) up until the evolution of man (5 million years ago). The distance between each station is proportional to the time interval between the corresponding evolutionary periods described at that station.

The exhibition was officially inaugurated on the 14th of September, 2018, in celebration of the 70th anniversary of the Max Planck Society.

== History ==
The exhibition was officially inaugurated on the 14th of September, 2018, in celebration of the 70th anniversary of the Max Planck Society. The project was conceived by Diethard Tautz of the Max Planck Institute for Evolutionary Biology, with support from Plön's Bürgermeister Lars Winter, the Plön city committee, and the Giordano Bruno Foundation.

== Stations ==
The Plön Evolution Path presents the history and evolution of life on earth in 11 stations. The distance between each station is proportional to the time interval between the corresponding evolutionary periods, broken into three separate linear time scales. As a result, the overall time path does not represent a linear scale, which would be difficult to represent in such a path. Each station includes an overview of the state of the Earth's continental drift at each respective time frame, including the relative position of Plön.

=== 3850 Mya: origin of life ===
"First Station" (Map). Google Maps.

The first station represents the formation of the building blocks of life on Earth, approximately 4 billion years ago. It is located on the Plön Market Bridge, near the start of the Plön Planet Walk.

=== 3000 Mya: photosynthesis ===
The second station describes the evolution of the molecular mechanism for photosynthesis.

=== 2400 Mya: atmospheric oxygen ===
The third station describes the rise in atmospheric oxygen on young earth, and the extinction event that resulted.

=== 1800 Mya: modern cells ===
The fourth station is related to the evolution of eukaryotic cells.

=== 1000 Mya: predecessors of animals ===
The fifth station describes the evolution of Choanoflagellates. These organisms are the closest relatives to Metazoa.

=== 800 Mya: snowball Earth ===
The sixth station discusses the second planetary-scale icing event that resulted in Snowball Earth, the break-up of the super-continent of Rodinia. This station is located on the shore of the Großer Plöner See, directly in front of the Plön Hauptbahnhof (Plön main station).

=== 560 Mya: Cambrian explosion ===
The seventh station outlines the effects of the Cambrian explosion, in which a large number of animal forms emerged within a relatively short evolutionary time period. This station is located near the Altes Fährhaus, which was the building originally opened by Otto Zacharias as the Plön Biological Station in 1917, before the laboratory was moved to the location of the current Max Planck Institute for Evolutionary Biology.

=== 480 Mya: conquering the land ===
The eighth station outlines the development of Earth's protective ozone layer and the subsequent colonization of plants, insects, and limbed vertebrates out of the oceans and onto land.

=== 251 Mya: start of the age of the dinosaurs ===
The ninth station describes the Permian–Triassic extinction event that paved the way for the Mesozoic era and the evolution of dinosaurs.

=== 66 Mya: start of the age of the mammals ===
The tenth station describes the extinction of the dinosaurs and the subsequent filling of their niche by mammals.

=== 5 Mya: evolution of humans ===
"Final Station" (Map). Google Maps.

The final station describes the evolution of humans and their migration out of Africa. It is located on August-Thienemann-Straße, outside of the Max Planck Institute for Evolutionary Biology.

== Table of represented ages and distances ==
Table of Represented Ages and Scaled Distances
Station	Million Years Ago (Mya)	Scaled Distance (meters)
Origin of Life	3,850	0
Photosynthesis	3,000	130
Atmospheric Oxygen	2,400	260
Modern Cells	1,800	390
Predecessors of Animals	1,000	520
Snowball Earth	800	650
Cambrian Explosion	560	780
Conquering the Land	480	910
Age of the Dinosaurs	251	1,040
Age of the Mammals	66	1,170
Evolution of Humans	5	1,300

== Reception ==
The Plön Evolution Path was met with a particularly positive response from Stadtwerke and Giordano Bruno Foundation representatives, a local group with the aim of teaching the subject of evolution to children.

The path was praised as being "aligned with the smartphone generation", with each station providing QR codes to expand the information provided through Internet links. It was also positively received for its integration with the Max Planck Institute's guided tours and lectures, with information on the path being tailored to appeal to the young and old alike.

== See also ==
- Max Planck Institute for Evolutionary Biology
- Solar System model
