= Naval Petty Officer School =

German Naval Petty Officer School

Coordinates: 54.149483°N 10.449745°E

- Marineunteroffizierschule
- Insignia of the Marineunteroffizierschule
- Founded: 1956; 70 years ago
- Country: Germany
- Branch: German Navy
- Type: Naval training establishment
- Part of: German Navy
- Garrison/HQ: Plön

Commanders
- Kommandeur: Captain Klaus Heermeier

The Marineunteroffizierschule (MUS) is a naval petty officer school of the German Navy in Plön. It reports to the Head of Personnel, Training, Organization in the Navy Command in Rostock.

== History ==
In the early days of the newly established German Navy, petty office training took place in Cuxhaven from 1956 and in Eckernförde from 1957 to 1960. The aforementioned training was finally relocated to the Ruhleben barracks in Plön (directly on the Großer Plöner See) in 1960. This barracks was built in 1938 and taken over by a naval non-commissioned officer training department. After the end of the Second World War, it served the British Army as the headquarters of Schleswig-Holstein until 1948, after which the barracks served as a boarding school for children of the armed forces of the United Kingdom (King Alfred School and Windsor Girls' School).

Since 1 November 2017, the Neustadt in Holstein location has had the Zentrum Wiedereinstellung Marine (ZWE Mar) as a sub-unit of the MUS.

On 2 January 2018, a 7th inspection belonging to the training school was set up at the Putlos military training area (Wagrien barracks). In the course of the trend reversal, it is intended to enable personnel to gradually grow in strength and is in particular charged with the implementation of Einsatzlandunspezifischen Ausbildung (ELUSA), additional shooting training and infantry training for candidate officers.

== Gallery ==
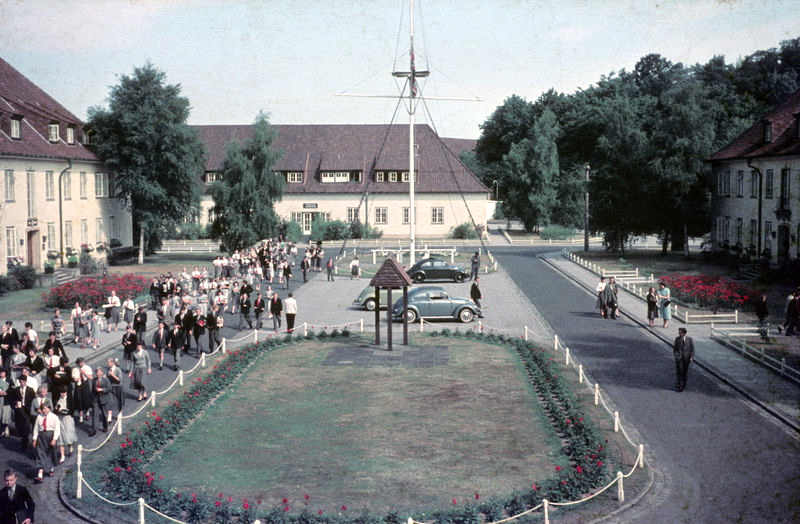
Headquarters and school building during the time of the King Alfred School

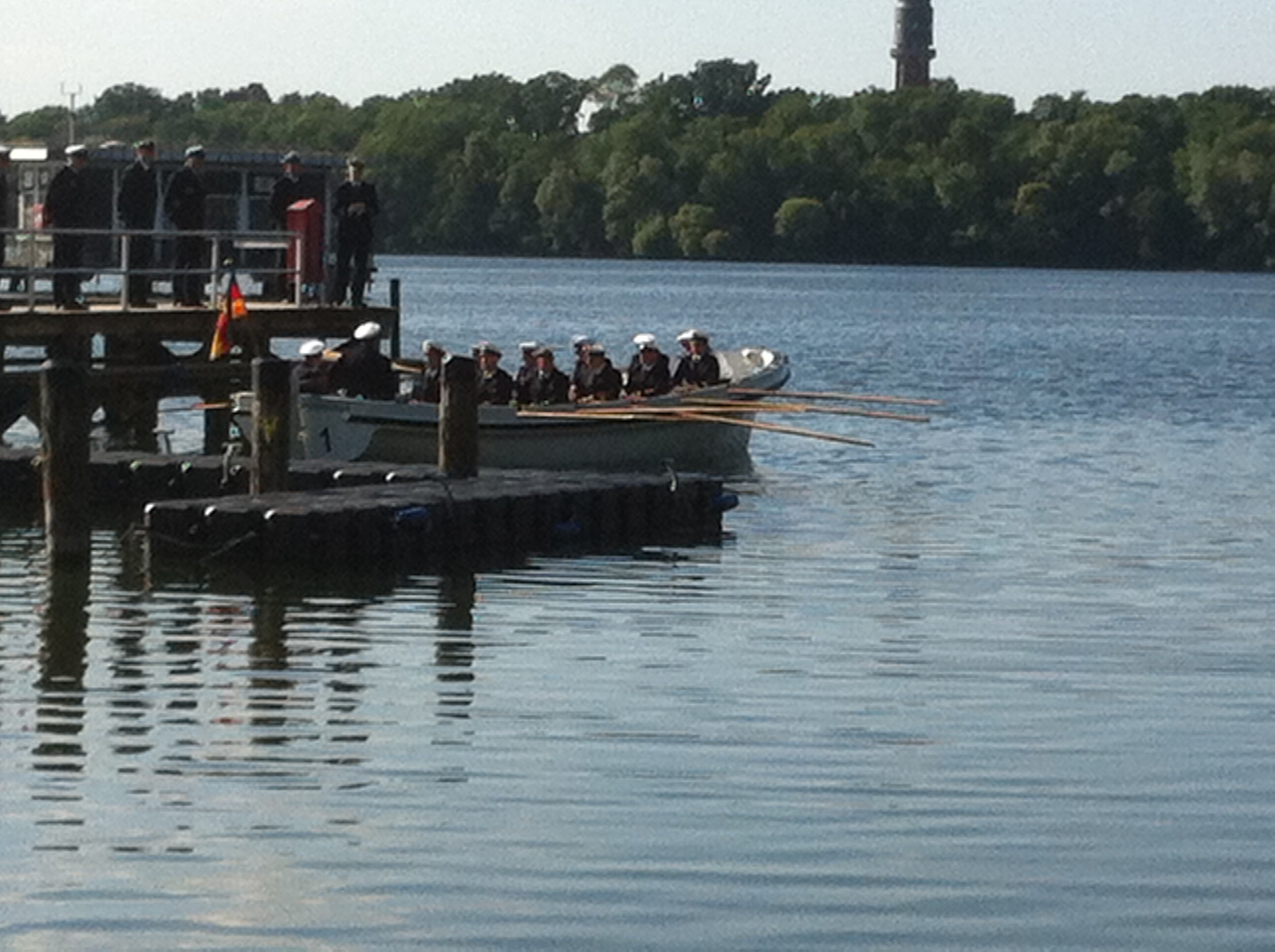
Traditional unloading of a departing commander with a marine cutter from the MUS dock

== See also ==
- German Navy
