= Naval Academy Mürwik =

Training establishment for all German Navy officers

Coordinates: 54°48′54″N 9°27′34″E

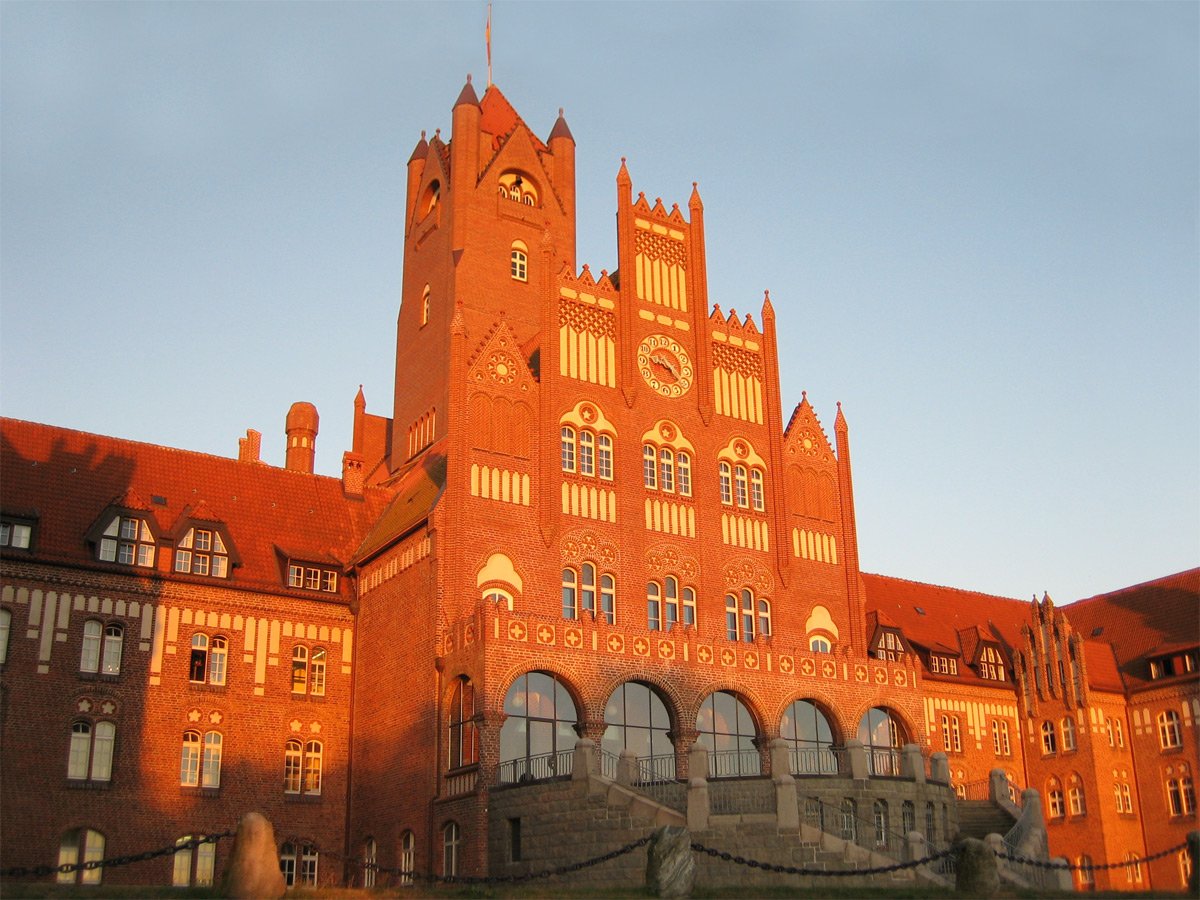
- Affiliations: German Navy
- Location: Mürwik, Flensburg, Germany

The Naval Academy Mürwik (German: Marineschule Mürwik) is the main training establishment for all German Navy officers and in 1910 replaced the German Imperial Naval Academy in Kiel (which is now the seat of government or ''Landeshaus'' of Schleswig-Holstein).

It is located at Mürwik which is a part of Germany's northernmost city, Flensburg. Built on a small hill directly by the coast, it overlooks the Flensburg Firth.

== History ==
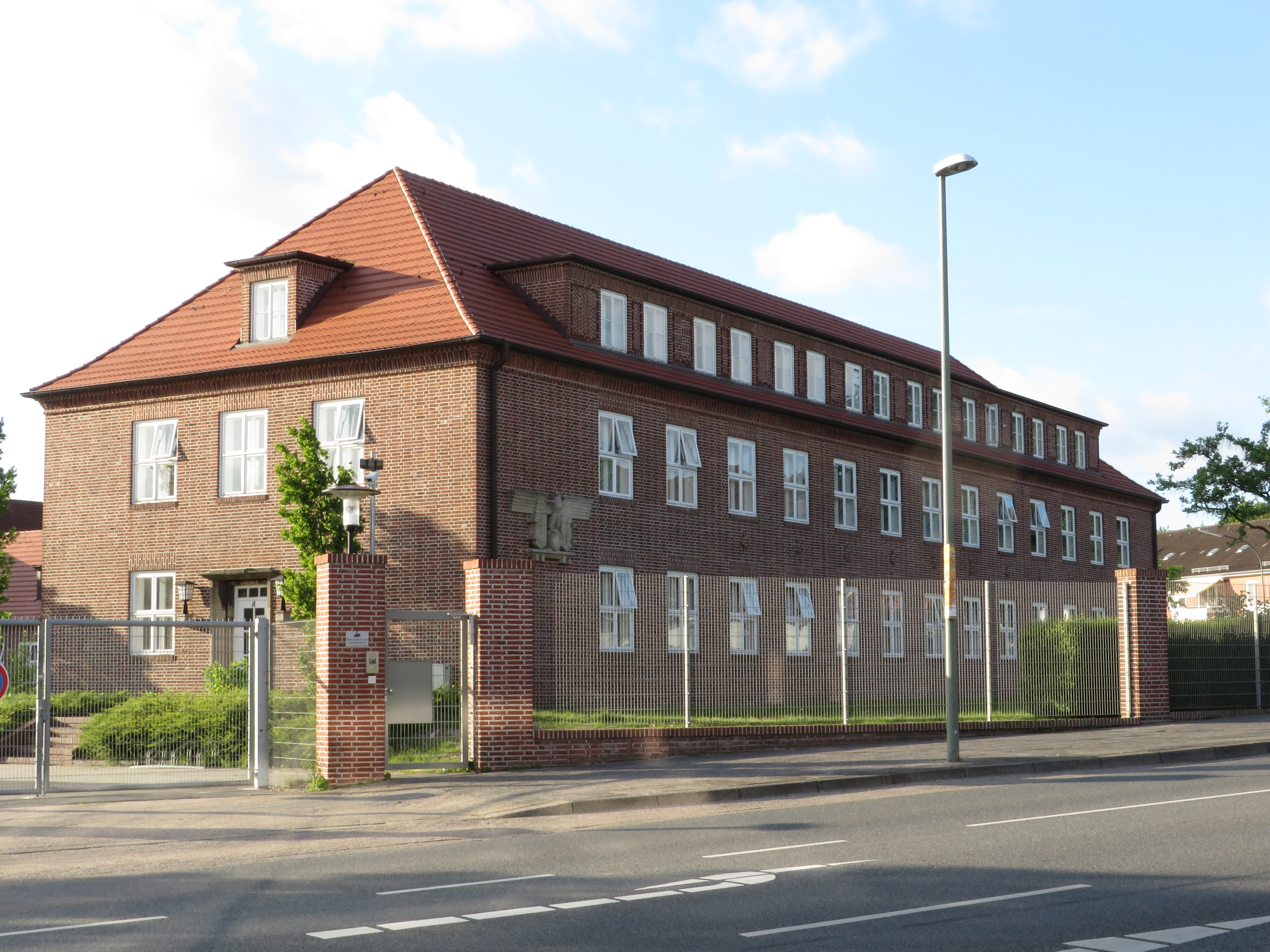
The Naval Academy's sports school building, the seat of the Flensburg government during the final days of the Second World War

The Naval Academy was established at this site by the order of Kaiser Wilhelm II in 1910. Its unusual gothic architecture, with dominating red brick, was intended to imitate the castle Ordensburg Marienburg, founded in 1274. The architect of the building was Adalbert Kelm.

Following the signing of the Treaty of Versailles, which officially ended the First World War, a British regiment, the Sherwood Foresters were garrisoned at the Naval Academy Mürwik to supervise the elections in the Schleswig plebiscites in the Flensburg-Mürwik region.

In the final days of World War II, Grand Admiral Karl Dönitz assumed the office of President (Reichspräsident) of Germany, having been named as Adolf Hitler's successor before Hitler's suicide in Berlin. Dönitz moved to the Naval Academy at Mürwik, where he established the Flensburg government in the sports school of the naval academy. This made Flensburg the de facto capital of Germany for nearly twenty days. Soon after the final surrender to the Allies, members of the group were unseated and arrested by British troops.

Today, the collection of the National Maritime Museum in Greenwich, London includes old ship models, old paintings and flags looted from the Naval Academy Mürwik by British troops after the war.

== Education of German naval officers ==
Badge of the Naval Academy at Mürwik

Most naval officer cadets join the German Navy after passing their Abitur (High school leaving certificate), and sign up for thirteen years of service (which can be extended to a "lifetime" of around 35 years when accepted by Bundesamt für das Personalmanagement der Bundeswehr).

The standard education consists of three parts:

The initial "basic education" at the Naval Academy in Mürwik lasts at least one year. and consists of four parts: Being new in the German Navy, all cadets first perform six weeks of collective basic training at Mürwik. After this they are divided in three groups which will consecutively take part in three sections of training: A sailing trip with German Navy's training ship Gorch Fock, a mission-preparing part at the "NCO's school" (Marineunteroffizierschule/MUS) in Plön, and the officer's training again at Mürwik. Cadets who will serve at the German forces' medical service only take part in the first trip with Gorch Fock and the six weeks basic training.

It is usually followed by university studies at the University of the German Federal Armed Forces, which last around four years, from which the majority graduate with Bachelor and/or Master's degrees.

Officers then return to the Naval Academy in Mürwik, and sometimes other naval schools, for advanced training. The advanced training lasts up to two years, depending on the officers' choice of an operational or engineering career and on the type of vessel they are going to serve on. Those heading for a land-based post also get the basic parts of the advanced training. Advanced training for officers provides further knowledge on various military topics, like leadership studies or military law. Depending on their choice of an engineering or operational career, officers will also join special courses like officer-of-the-watch training, specialized weapon systems training or naval engineering.

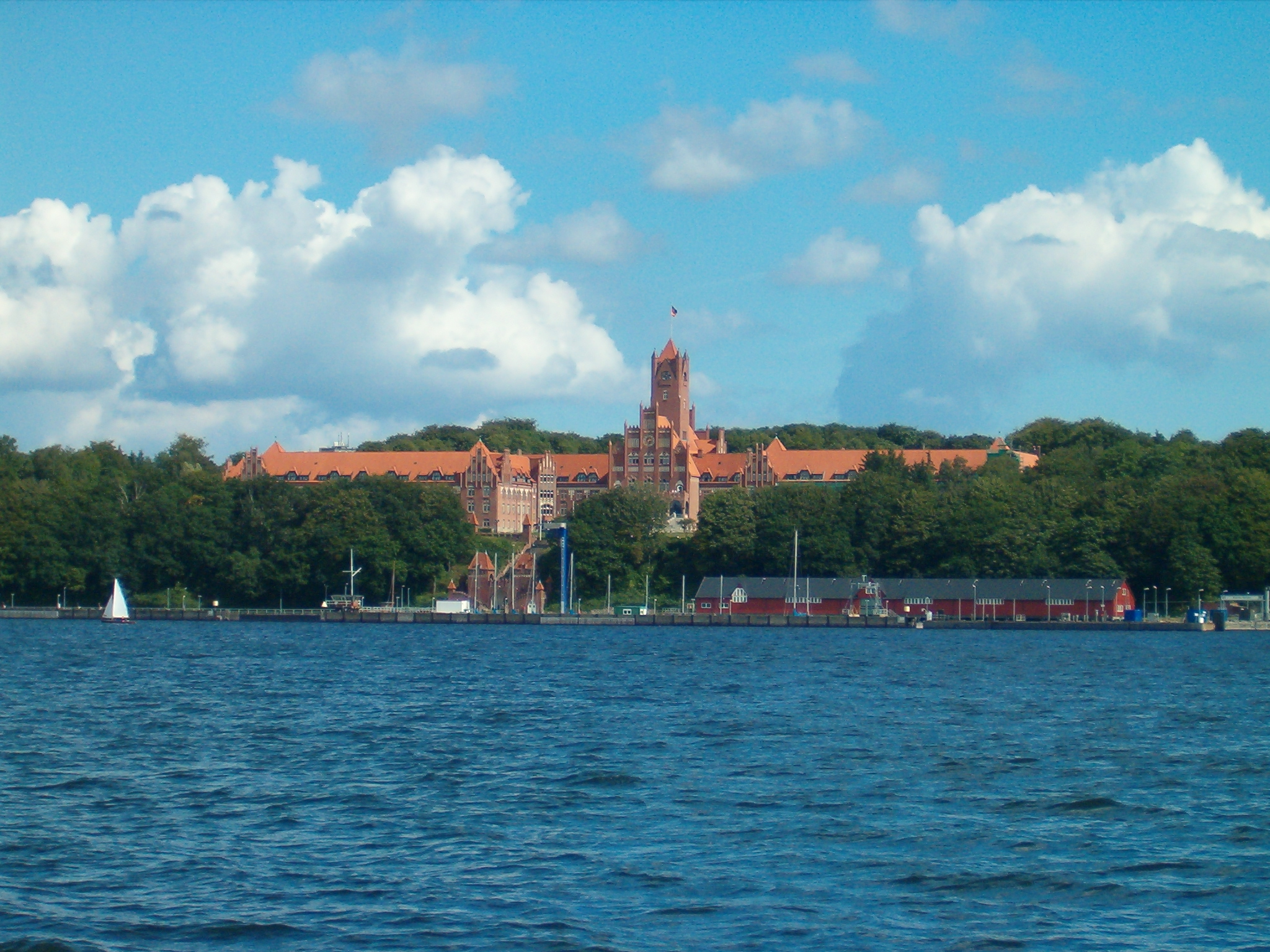
Main building of the school the Red Castle by the Sea

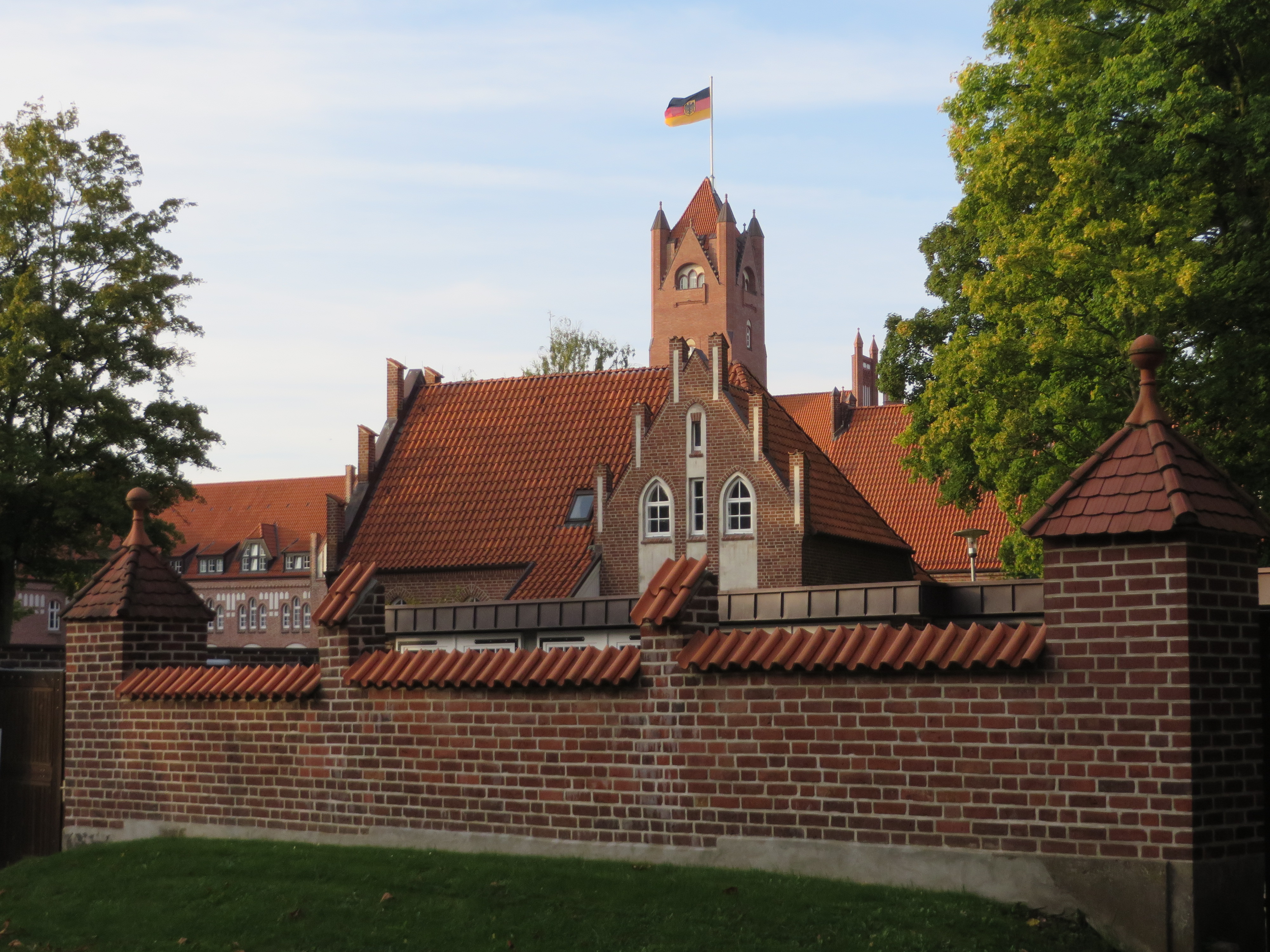
The school from the main gate (2014)
