= King Alfred School =

King Alfred School may refer to:

- King Alfred School, London, an independent school in London, England
- The King Alfred School, Highbridge, a state secondary school in Highbridge, Somerset, England
- King Alfred School, Plön, A BFES (British Forces Education Service) boarding school, which existed in Germany from 1948 to 1959
- King Alfred's Academy, Wantage, Oxfordshire formerly King Alfred's School.

== See also ==
- King Alfred's College, a teacher-training college in Winchester, England, now part of the University of Winchester
