= Ruhleben =

This is a disambiguation page. Ruhleben may refer to

- Ruhleben - an area in Berlin, Germany, within the localities of Westend and Spandau
- Ruhleben (Berlin U-Bahn) - a Berlin underground station
- Ruhleben internment camp - a World War I detention camp for enemy civilians
- Ruhleben Barracks - a German naval barracks in Plön, Holstein
