= Princes' Island =

Peninsula in Germany

Coordinates: 54°8′21.066″N 10°24′33.59″E

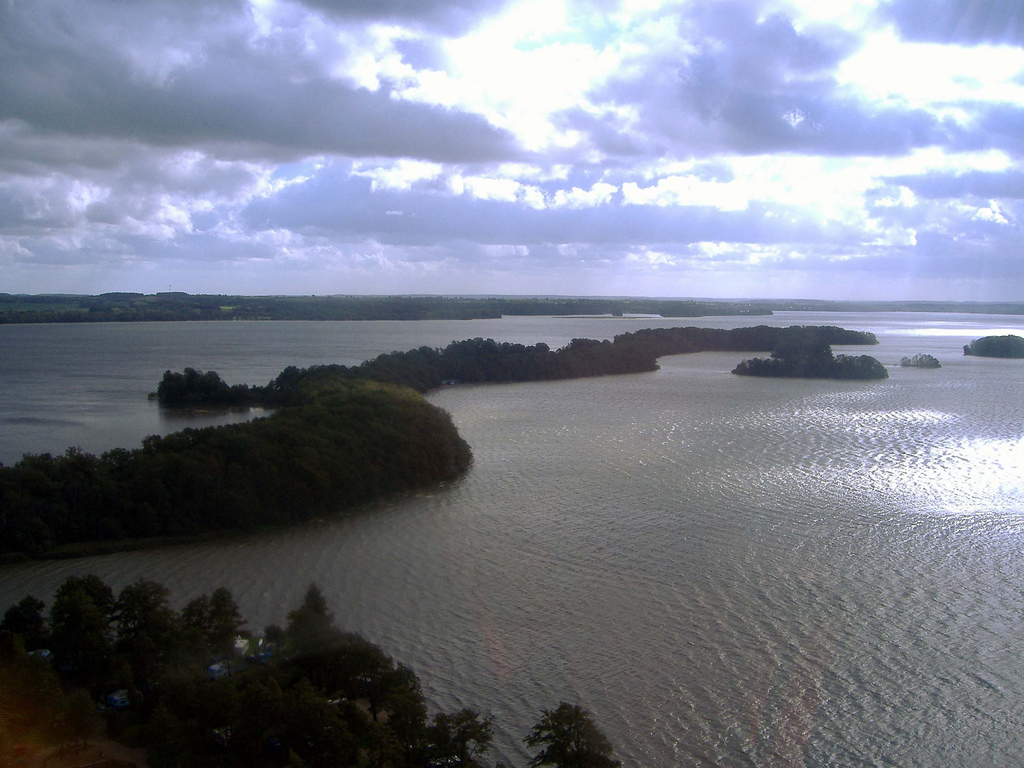
Princes' Island, southwards

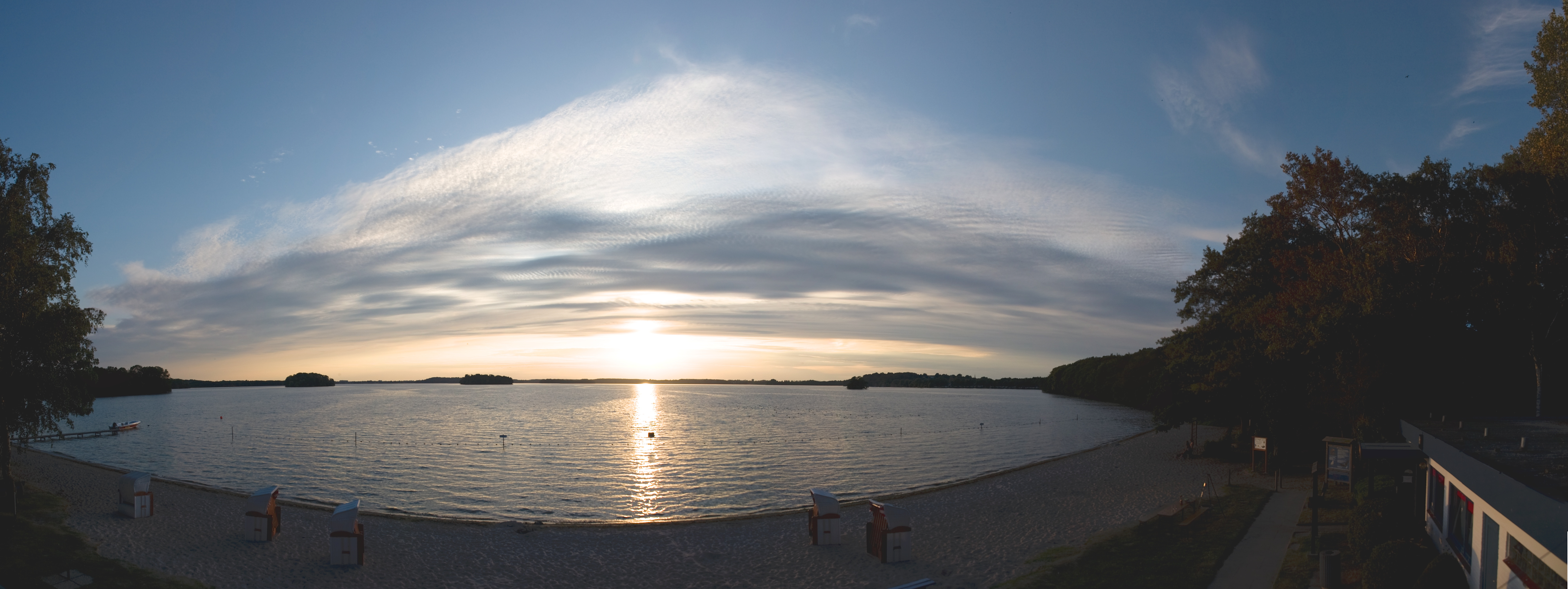
Beach of Princes' Island with view in the direction of Ascheberg

The Princes' Island (German: Prinzeninsel) is a peninsula in the Großer Plöner See southwest of the town of Plön in the north German state of Schleswig-Holstein.

Princes' Island was turned into a peninsula in the 19th century by the artificial lowering of the water level. It is about 2 km long and only about 30 m wide in places. At the southern end is the Niedersächsisches Bauernhaus ("Lower Saxon farmhouse") dating to the 17th century, which is now operated as a restaurant and breeds geese and moorland sheep of the Heidschnucke variety. Princes' Island is mainly forested, but some areas of the shoreline are also swampy. It is closed to motor traffic.

The sons of the last German Emperor William II learned agricultural skills on the old farm which their father had purchased, while they lived in the Princes' House on the bank of the lake. The southern tip of the Prinzeninsel was a favourite spot of the last German Empress, Augusta Victoria of Schleswig-Holstein. The current owner of the island is Georg Friedrich, Prince of Prussia.

The boats of the Großer-Plöner-See-Rundfahrt, that make round trips of the lake, land near the Niedersächsisches Bauernhaus. At the farmhouse is an inscription: melior nihil nihil homini libero dignius agricultura 1901: "Nothing is better, nothing more worthy of free people, than farming."

The peninsula also has an outdoor swimming pool, which goes under the name of Prinzenbad ("Princes' pool"), because the Hohenzollern sons learnt to swim there. It has a fine sandy beach on the west side where the lake bed shelves very gently so that, 30 metres offshore, the depth is just 1.20 metres. Whilst from 1947-1963 there was a campsite and restaurant here on a very small scale, bathers are now largely on their own. In the modern buildings that have replaced the old ones, there is, inter alia, a lifeguard station of the DLRG in Plon.
