= Princes' House =

Castle in Germany

Coordinates: 54°09′15″N 10°24′33″E

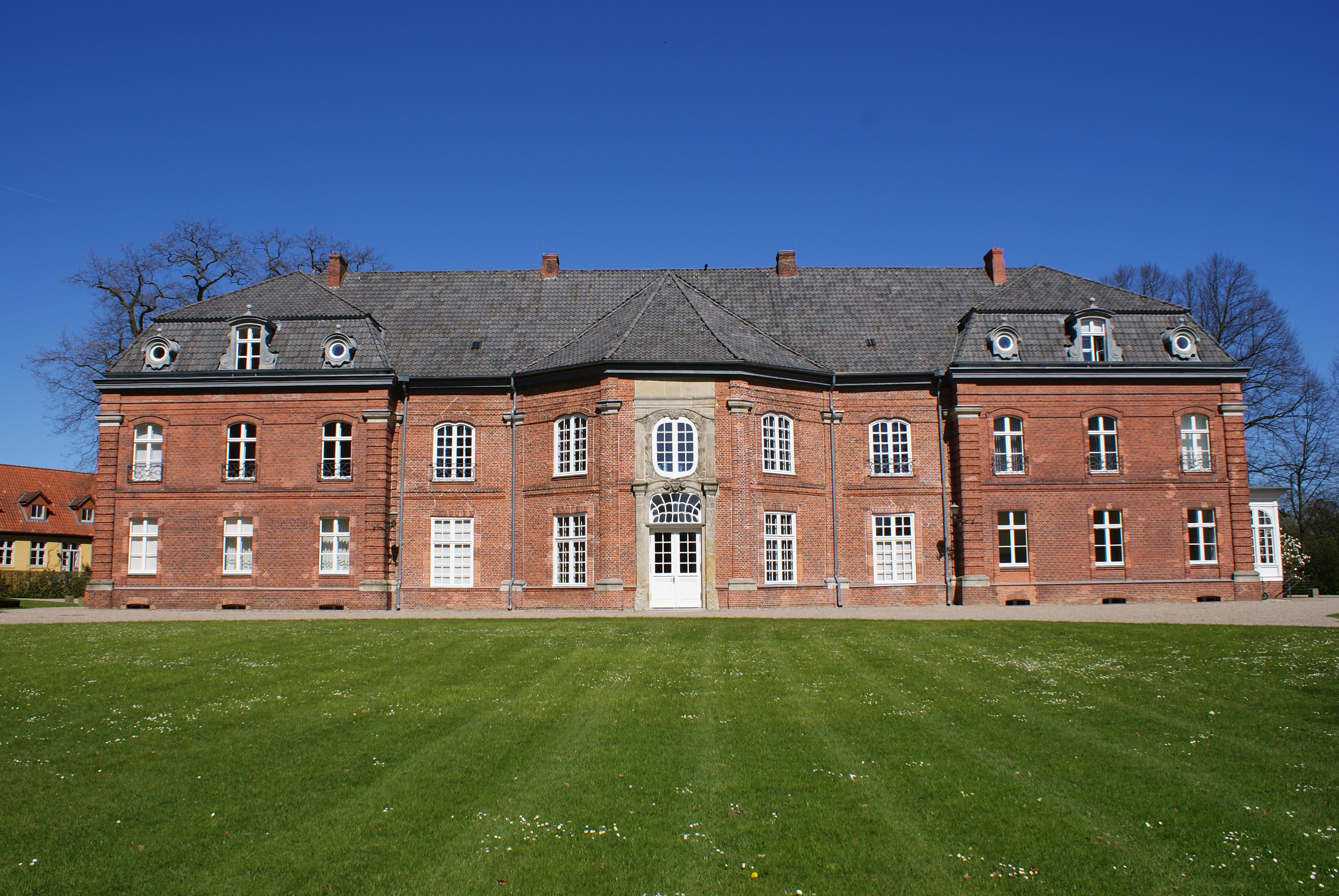
The Princes' House at Plön. View of the garden façade. The centre of the building is based on the pavilion from the 18th century. Left and right of it are the 19th century extensions

The Princes' House (German: Prinzenhaus) in Plön in the North German state of Schleswig-Holstein is a former royal summer residence in the grounds of the park at Plön Castle. It is the only surviving maison de plaisance in Schleswig-Holstein.

It was given its present name because at the end of the 19th and beginning of the 20th century it was used as a residence and school for the sons of the German emperor, William II. At that time it was enlarged with two extensions. A farm on nearby Princes' Island served the princes as a learning site for agricultural skills.

== Sources ==
- Deutsche Stiftung Denkmalschutz (Hg.in): Kulturerbe bewahren. Förderprojekte der Deutschen Stiftung Denkmalschutz. Bd. 3: Schlösser, Burgen, Parks. Monumente, Bonn 2004, ISBN 3-936942-44-7, S. 202–211.
- Dehio: Handbuch der Deutschen Kunstdenkmäler Hamburg, Schleswig-Holstein. Deutscher Kunstverlag, München 1994, ISBN 978-3-422-03033-6
- J. Habich, D. Lafrenz, H. Schulze, L. Wilde: Schlösser und Gutsanlagen in Schleswig-Holstein. L&H Verlag, Hamburg 1998, ISBN 978-3-928119-24-5
