= King Alfred School, Plön =

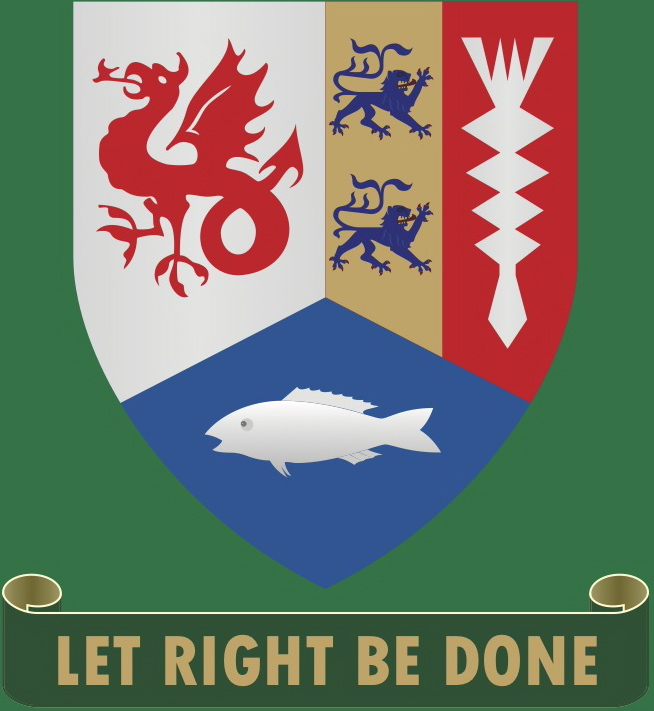

Location
- Ruhleben Kaserne, Plön, Germany
- Coordinates: 54.1506°N 10.45067°E

Information
- Type: Coeducational, Bilateral-Comprehensive, Secondary Boarding School
- Opened: May 1948
- Closed: July 1959
- Colour: Red on Green
- Mascot: Wyvern - 'Wyvie'
- Newspaper: KASper

King Alfred School, Plön, was a boarding school for children whose parents were British military or civil service personnel working in Germany; between 1948 and 1959, it educated approximately 4000 pupils aged between 11 and 18 years old.

== Introduction ==
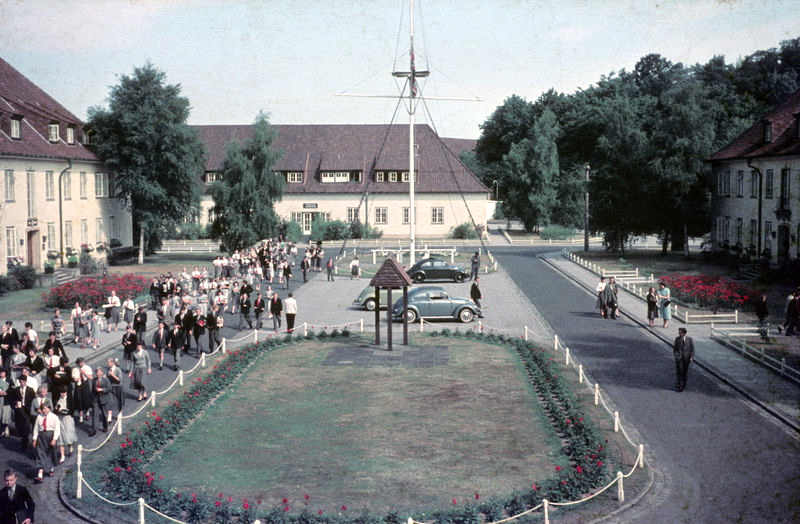
Pupils moving from school assembly in Butler Hall to lessons in Alexander Classrooms.

As a result of Operation Union, King Alfred School (KAS), Plön was opened as the second British Families Education Service (BFES) boarding school in Germany by the Minister of Education, George Tomlinson MP in May 1948. KAS was a co-educational, bilateral-comprehensive, secondary, boarding school for children whose parents were serving with either the British or Canadian Armed Forces or the Allied Control Commission, Germany throughout the British Occupation Zone of Germany. It was established in the former Kriegsmarine Ruhleben Kaserne, a barracks beside the Grosser Plöner See, near the Holsteinische Schweiz town of Plön in Schleswig Holstein.

During World War II, the Kriegsmarine used Ruhleben Kaserne for U-boat crew training. After WW2, these barracks were renamed HMS Royal Alfred by the Royal Navy's Flag Officer, Schleswig Holstein, Rear Admiral Tom Baillie Grohman. Subsequently, this Royal Navy's 'ship's' title, became the basis of the school's name - King Alfred. Currently, the German Navy's Marineunteroffizierschule (MUS) is stationed there.

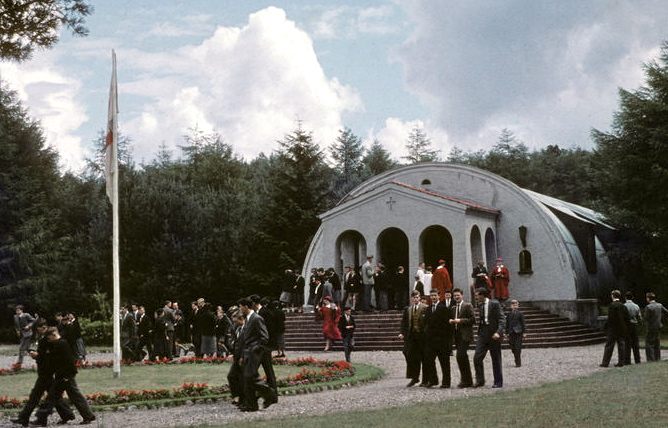
Pupils leaving Sunday morning church service in St George's School Chapel. Choristers wearing red gowns.

== Campus ==
The school's facilities included teaching and library buildings, craft workshops, assembly and dining halls, a double gym, a running track and playing fields, stables, a boathouse and school clinic. The only significant British building was St George's School Chapel constructed from two Nissen huts; it is now a listed building.

== Concept ==
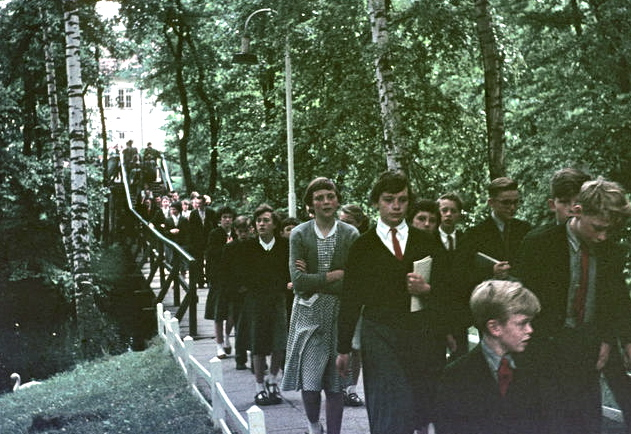
Pupils crossing the Norwegian Bridge from morning lessons in Alexander Classrooms to lunch in the Dining Hall.

The founding Headmaster was Lieutenant Colonel Freddie Spencer Chapman who introduced Kurt Hahn’s Gordonstoun ideals of service, discipline and strength of personality into the school ethos. The last Headmaster was Mr 'Hugh' Wallis-Hosken.

The school was staffed with British teachers and administrators as well as German support staff. The 600 or so boys and girls aged 11 to 18 were accommodated in five twinned houses with up to 60 boys or girls living in each part-house. A housemaster with three or four male teachers and a matron led one part-house; while a housemistress with three or four female teachers and another matron led the other half of the house. Each housemaster and housemistress was supported by senior pupils who were appointed as either Helpers or Assistants and, from Autumn 1956, as Prefects. Each physically separate part-house, accommodation building was united by a strong house corporate identity. The houses were named after scholars who were also men of action.

== Curriculum ==
Under the KAS bilateral-comprehensive system, those pupils, who had passed an eleven-plus exam, undertook the General Certificate of Education syllabus; or, prior to 1951, either the School Certificate (UK) or the Civil service exam syllabi. Otherwise, they followed Royal Society of Arts as well as Pitman's Commercial courses. HM Inspectorate of Schools visited KAS routinely.

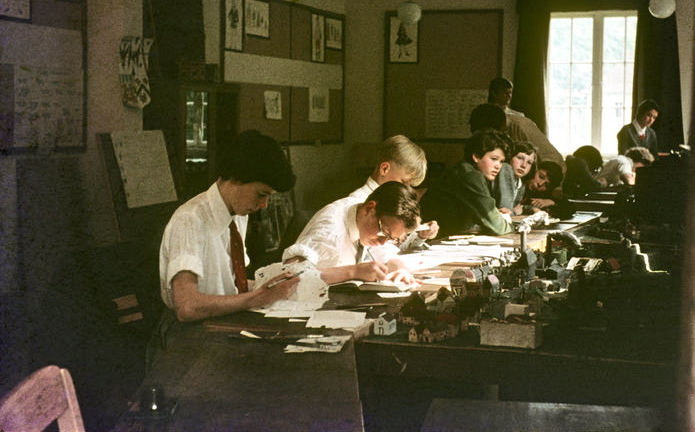
Pupils preparing a history project display in the History Room, Alexander Classrooms for the annual Speech Day.

== Extra-curricular activities ==
A major feature of the school was the emphasis given to sports and extra-curricular activities. During its short life of 11 years, KAS won, no less than six times, the Milocarian Trophy for athletics in British schools, as well as the 4 x 110 yards relay race at the London Athletic Club's Schools' Meeting held in the White City Stadium, London. Apart from the usual school sports, there were also: Scouts, Guides and CCF camps, horse riding and dinghy sailing, as well as inter-house music and verse-speaking competitions. The school assembly hall, a fully equipped theatre, was the venue for some memorable school productions. In 1949, the Rank Organisation filmed Looking for Trouble at the school; all the supporting cast were members of staff or pupils of the school. In January 1955, KAS competed in the BBC Radio Top of the Form quiz show.

== Closure and legacy ==
In 1959 the school was closed for economic reasons. The Wyvern Club, whose 'Wyvie' members are former KAS staff or pupils, meets in London annually. Other 'Wyvie' gatherings are also held further afield in Australia, Canada, New Zealand and South Africa. During the latest Wyvern Club visit to the former KAS, now Marineunteroffizierschule (MUS), Ruhleben Kaserne, a 'Wyvie' crew of former pupils and their offspring competed in the Plön Dragon Boat Festival. The official KAS archived records have been lost; so today, the Ploen Trophy of the Milocarian Athletic Club serves as a memorial to this school's remarkable reputation, particularly in the field of athletics. As a link to the former KAS the 1. Inspektion of the Marineunteroffizierschule is showing the red wyvern of the KAS in her coat of arms.
