= Parnass Tower =

Coordinates: 54°10′04″N 10°25′42″E

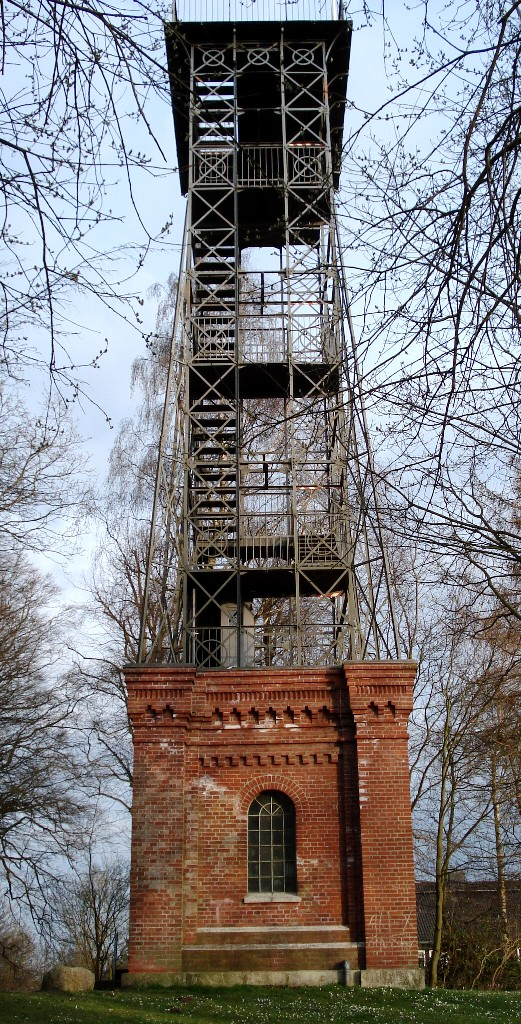
The Parnaß Tower in Plön

The Parnass Tower (German: Parnaß-Turm) is an observation tower located in the town of Plön in the North German state of Schleswig-Holstein. It sits on the summit of the low hill of Parnaß, which is a terminal moraine).

The tower stands 20 metres high and is made of steel lattice, built on a stone plinth with an observation platform 20 metres above the ground (and 85 metres above sea level).

Erected in 1888 by the Plön Tourist Association (Plöner Verschönerungsverein), the tower underwent renovation in 1985 and has since reopened as an observation tower.

On the southern side of the stone base of the tower are three panels with:

- an Iron Cross with the coat of arms of Schleswig-Holstein and the dates 1848 and 1849 (in memory of the First Schleswig War)
- a portrait relief of Emperor William I
- an Iron Cross with a "W" and the date 1870 (in memory of the Franco-Prussian War)

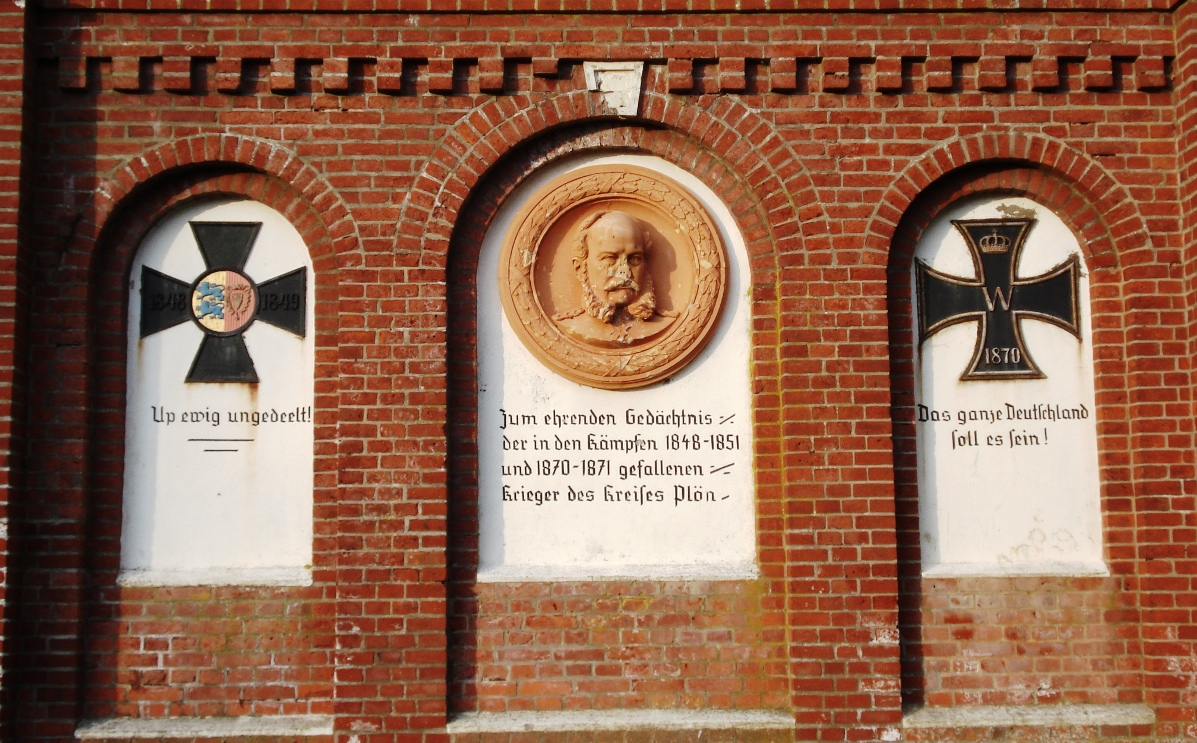
The relief on the Parnass Tower

From the top of the tower are views over the town of Plön and all of the surrounding countryside with its lakes.
