= Diethard Tautz =

German biologist and geneticist (born 1957)

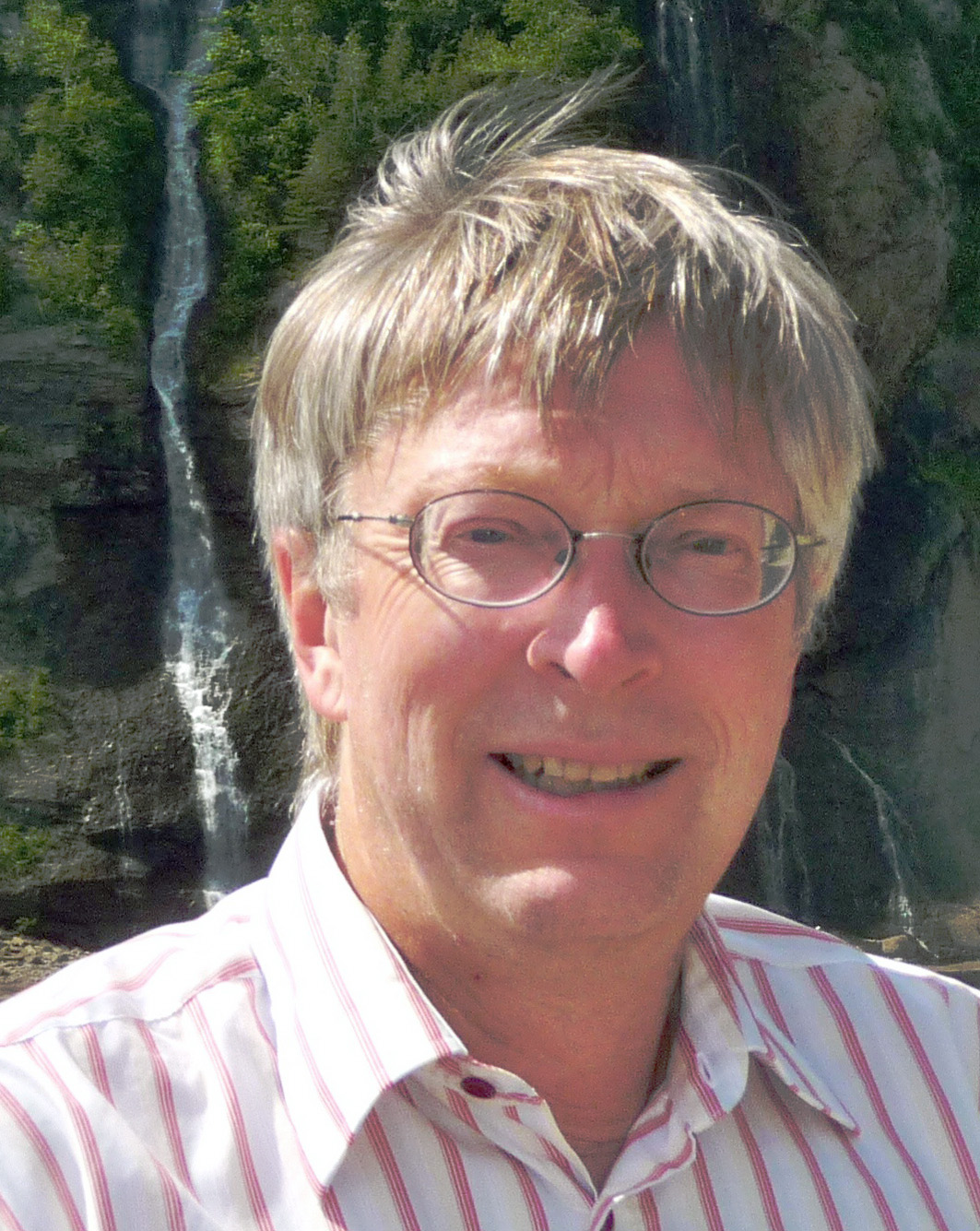
- Born: 17 August 1957 (age 69); Glonn, West Germany
- Citizenship: German
- Known for: development of DNA fingerprinting technique; linking evolution and development (evo-devo)
- Awards: Gerhard-Hess-Prize of the Deutsche Forschungsgemeinschaft (DFG), Philip Morris Research Award, Order of Merit of the Federal Republic of Germany
- Scientific career
- Fields: molecular evolution and developmental genetics
- Workplaces: Max Planck Institute for Evolutionary Biology

Diethard Tautz (born 17 August 1957 in Glonn) is a German biologist and geneticist, who is primarily concerned with the molecular basis of the evolution of mammals. Since 2006 he is director at the Max Planck Institute for Evolutionary Biology in Plön.

== Life ==
From 1976 to 1981, Tautz studied biology at the Goethe University Frankfurt and at the University of Tübingen. He completed a doctorate in 1983 at the EMBL in Heidelberg and the Max Planck Institute in Tübingen. He spent two years as a postdoc at the University of Cambridge, UK. From 1985 to 1987, he worked at the Max Planck Institute for Developmental Biology in Tübingen as a postdoc. After his habilitation in 1988, he worked as a research group leader at the Max Planck Institute for Developmental Biology until 1990.

In 1991, he was appointed professor at the Zoological Institute of LMU Munich in 1991, and at the Institute of Genetics at the University of Cologne in 1998. Since 2006, Tautz is a "Scientific Member" of the Max Planck Society and director at the Max Planck Institute for Evolutionary Biology in Plön.

== Scientific contribution ==
Tautz's early research included the characterization of simple sequence repeats, now commonly known as microsatellites. He later contributed to the development of genetic fingerprinting methods based on these sequences.

During postdoctoral work in Tübingen with groups led by Herbert Jäckle and Christiane Nüsslein-Volhard, Tautz studied developmental genetics in ''Drosophila''. He cloned and characterized the segmentation gene ''hunchback'' and contributed to the development of whole-mount in situ hybridization for studying spatial and temporal patterns of gene expression.

His research examined the evolution of developmental processes and segmentation, including work using the beetle ''Tribolium'' as a model organism. He also participated in the sequencing and analysis of the ''Tribolium'' genome. Tautz was the founding editor-in-chief of the journal Development Genes and Evolution.

At LMU Munich, his research expanded to population genetics, speciation, and molecular phylogenetics. His studies included sympatric speciation in cichlids, hybrid speciation in European sculpins, and arthropod evolutionary relationships.

After moving to the University of Cologne, Tautz worked on comparative genomics and the evolution of novel genes. His research provided evidence for the de novo origin of protein-coding genes from previously non-coding DNA and identified a eukaryotic polycistronic peptide-coding gene. He has also studied the genetic basis of adaptation using natural populations and subspecies of the house mouse (''Mus musculus''), applying approaches from population genetics, comparative genomics, and quantitative genetics.

== Memberships ==
From 2005 to 2006, Tautz was president of the German Zoological Society. Since 2009, he is president of the Association of Biology, Biosciences and Biomedicine in Germany (VBIO). He is an elected member of European Molecular Biology Organization and the Deutsche Akademie der Naturforscher Leopoldina. He is also editor of scientific journals and, since 2012, senior editor of "eLIFE" and since 2014 senior editor of "Molecular Ecology".

== Honors and awards ==
- 1990 Gerhard-Hess-Prize of the Deutsche Forschungsgemeinschaft (DFG)
- 1995 Philip Morris Research Award
- 2021 Order of Merit of the Federal Republic of Germany

== Publications ==
Research Gate Publication list
