= Otto Zacharias =

German zoologist

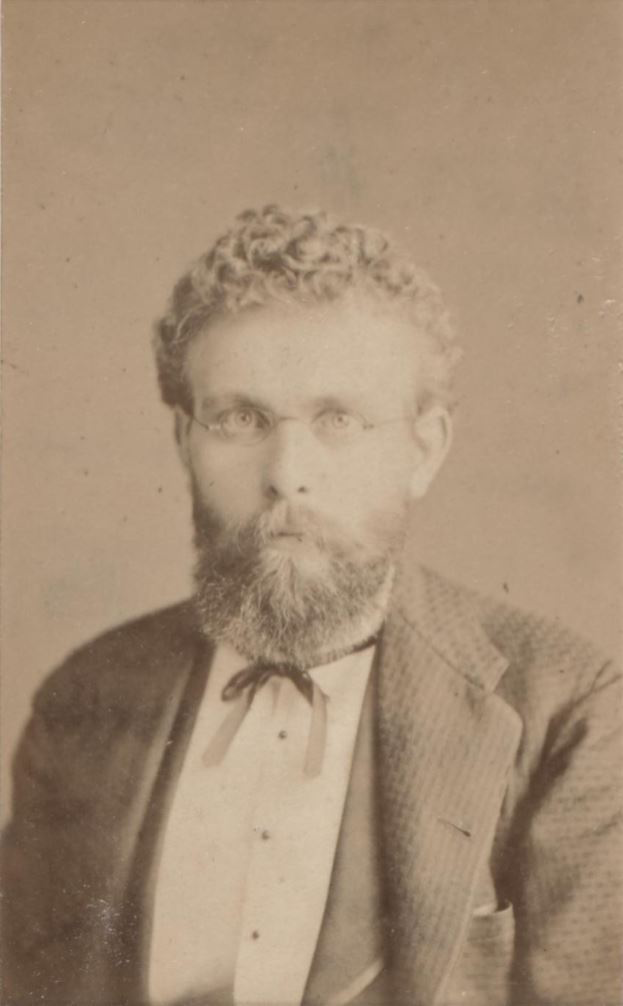
Zacharias in 1876

Emil Otto Zacharias (January 27, 1846, Leipzig – October 2, 1916, Kiel) was a German zoologist and plankton researcher, as well as popularizer of science and journalist.

== Life ==
After a training as a mechanic, Otto Zacharias immersed himself autodidactically into the study of astronomy and studied in Leipzig, including mathematics, philosophy and zoology. For many years he worked as a tutor in Italy, where he devoted himself mainly to the popular science presenting complex issues of biology.

Zacharias held a long correspondence with leading researchers and writers in Prussia and elsewhere, including Ernst Haeckel, Charles Darwin, Rudolf Virchow, Joseph Kürschner and Wilhelm Bölsche. In 1891, Zacharias was supported financially by the Prussian government and several private individuals to establish, on Großer Plöner See, the first "Biological Station" for limnology (freshwater research) based on German soil as a private research institute. The inspiration for this was the Stazione Zoologica founded in 1870 in Naples by Anton Dohrn, which was already highly recognized.

Zacharias was an advocate of Darwinism. He supported the evolutionary ideas of Charles Darwin and Ernst Haeckel. In 1877, Zacharias came across a strange monstrosity at a marketplace, a pig with thumbs developed on both forelimbs. Intrigued about the possibility of atavism, he purchased the pig and sent one of the feet to Darwin to ask for his opinion.

As the director Zacharias published research reports from 1893 on the activities at Plön station, which were recorded from 1905 in the Archives of Hydrobiology. In so-called "summer schools" Zacharias trained teachers and laity interested in working with the microscope.

The Centre became known as the Max Planck Institute of Limnology. As of 2008 the Institute is no longer in the original building but still in Plön. It was renamed in April 2007 as part of the Max Planck Institute for Evolutionary Biology.

Zacharias has a water mite Arrenurus zachariae Koenike, 1886 named after him.

== Selected works ==
- Charles Darwin und die kulturhistorische Bedeutung seiner Theorie vom Ursprung der Arten. Berlin 1882.
- Über gelöste und ungelöste Probleme der Naturforschung. 2. Aufl. Leipzig 1891.
- Katechismus des Darwinismus. Leipzig 1891.
- Die Tier- und Pflanzenwelt des Süßwassers. 2 Bde. Leipzig 1891.
- Das Plankton. Leipzig 1907.
