= Max Planck Institute for Evolutionary Biology =

Research institute located in Plön, Schleswig-Holstein, Germany

Coordinates: 54°9′36″N 10°26′2″E

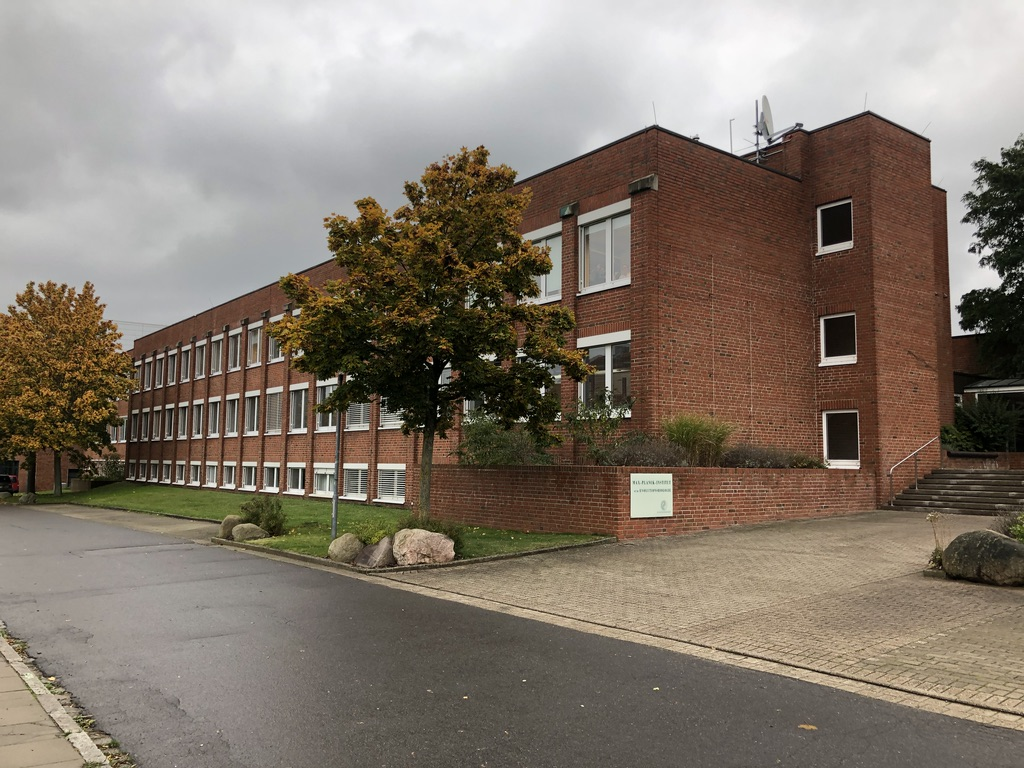
Front view of MPI-EB

The Max Planck Institute for Evolutionary Biology is a German institute for evolutionary biology. It is located in Plön, Schleswig-Holstein, Germany.

== History ==
The institute was founded by German zoologist Otto Zacharias as Hydrobiologische Station zu Plön. Working in Italy in the 1880s, Zacharias was inspired by the highly recognised Stazione Zoologica in Naples, founded in 1870 by Anton Dohrn, to set up the first biological station for freshwater research in Germany. He secured financial support from the Prussian government and several private individuals to establish it on Großer Plöner See in 1891, as a private research institute.

As the director, Zacharias published research reports from 1893 on the Station's activities, which were recorded from 1905 in the Archives of Hydrobiology. In so-called "summer schools" Zacharias trained teachers and laity interested in working with the microscope.

It became part of the Max Planck Society in 1948, and was renamed in 1966 as the Max Planck Institute of Limnology.

It was renamed again as Max Planck Institute for Evolutionary Biology in 2007, marking a change of the research focus towards evolutionary biology.

== Departments ==
- Evolutionary Genetics (Diethard Tautz)
- Evolutionary Theory (Arne Traulsen)
- Microbial Population Biology (Paul Rainey)

== Research groups ==
- Behavioural Genomics (Miriam Liedvogel)
- Biological Clocks (Tobias Kaiser)
- Dynamics of Social Behavior (Christian Hilbe)
- Evolutionary Cell Biology (Javier López Garrido)
- Craniofacial Biology (Marketa Kaucka )
- Environmental Genomics (Eva Stukenbrock)
- Antibiotic Resistance Evolution (Hinrich Schulenburg)
- Evolutionary Genomics (John Baines)
- Evolutionary Immunogenomics (Tobias L. Lenz)
