= Ruhleben Barracks =

The Ruhleben barracks (German: Ruhleben-Kaserne) is part of the German naval establishment located in Plön, Holstein, Germany.

From 1940 to 1945 it was home to the III U-Boat Training Division (III Untersee-Boot Ausbildungsabteilung). On April 22, 1945 Grand Admiral Karl Dönitz moved the headquarters of the Naval High Command (Oberkommando der Marine) there. As of April 30, 1945 until May 2, 1945, following Dönitz being named head of the German Reich, it was the de facto capital of Germany.

On May 7, 1945, the installation was captured by British forces who installed themselves there and renamed it the Connaught Barracks. Towards the end of formal British occupation, the British set up the King Alfred School on March 10, 1948, to teach the children of the British military service personnel stationed in Germany.

Following the re-establishment of the German Navy, the barracks reopened as the home of the Naval NCO School (Marineunteroffizierschule Plön) on September 9, 1960.
