= Plön =

Plön Plöön (Low German)
- Town
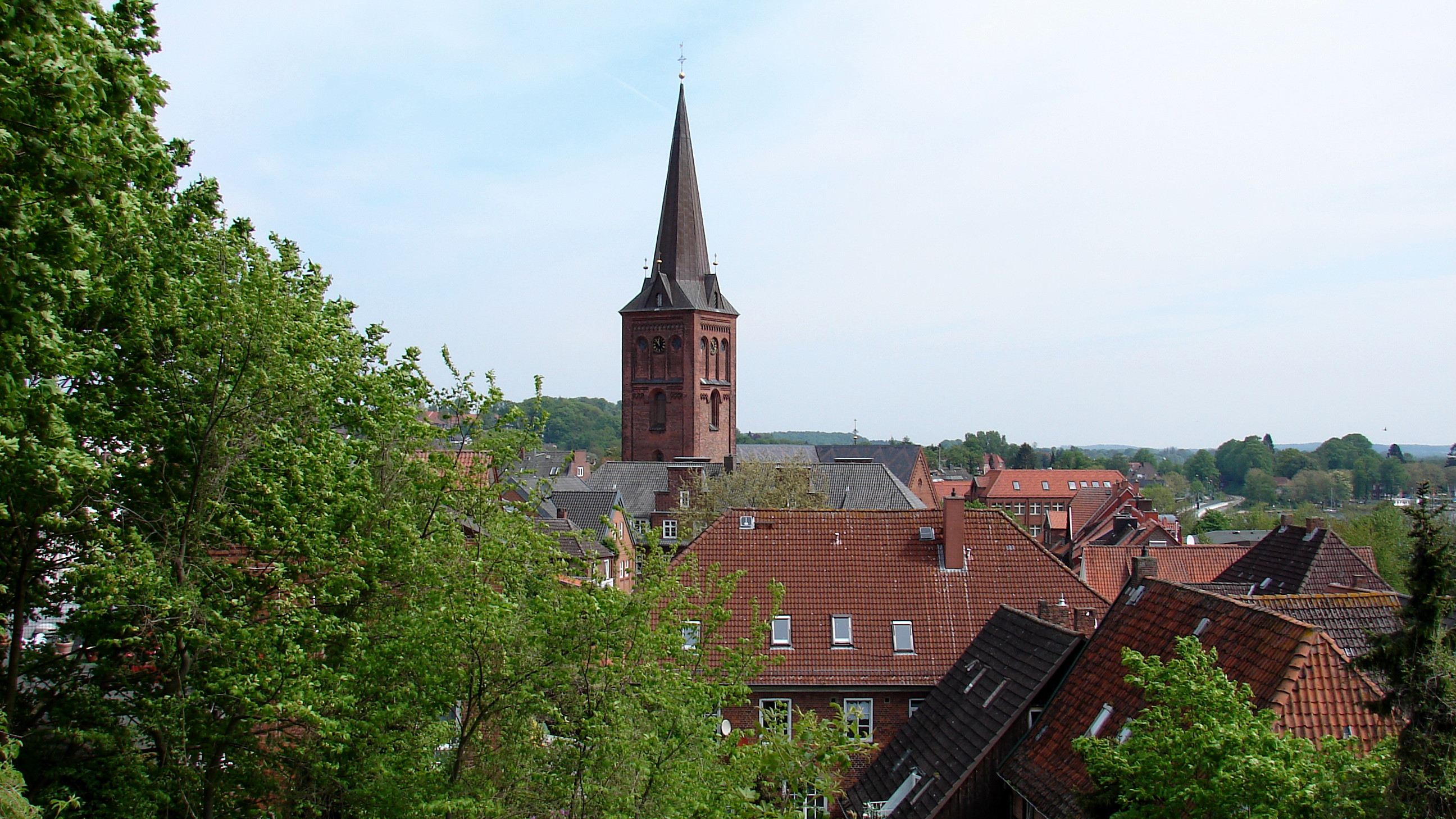

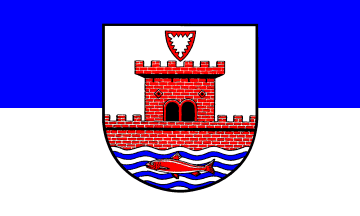
- Flag Coat of arms

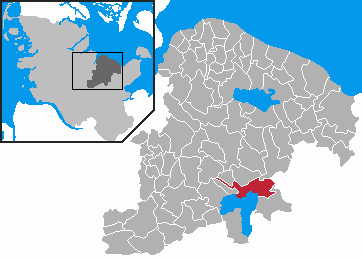
- Location of Plön within Plön district
- Interactive map of Plön
- Location within Germany Location within Schleswig-Holstein
- Coordinates: 54°9′44″N 10°25′17″E
- Country: Germany
- State: Schleswig-Holstein
- District: Plön

Government
  - Mayor: Lars Winter (SPD)

Area
  - Total: 36.76 km^{2} (14.19 sq mi)
- Elevation: 26 m (85 ft)

Population (2025-12-31)
  - Total: 8,851
  - Density: 240.8/km^{2} (623.6/sq mi)
- Time zone: UTC+01:00 (CET)
  - Summer (DST): UTC+02:00 (CEST)
- Postal codes: 24301–24306
- Dialling codes: 04522
- Vehicle registration: PLÖ
- Website: www.ploen.de

Plön (German: [ˈpløːn]; Holsatian: Plöön) is the district seat of the Plön district in Schleswig-Holstein, Germany, and has about 8,700 inhabitants. It lies right on the shores of Schleswig-Holstein's biggest lake, the Great Plön Lake, as well as on several smaller lakes, touching the town on virtually all sides. The town's landmark is Plön Castle, a chateau built in the 17th century on a hill overlooking the town.

Plön has a grammar school with a 300-year history, and is home to a German Navy non-commissioned officer school and the Max Planck Institute for Evolutionary Biology. The town, nestled as it is in the hilly, wooded lake district of Holstein Switzerland (Holsteinische Schweiz), also has importance in the tourism industry.

== History ==
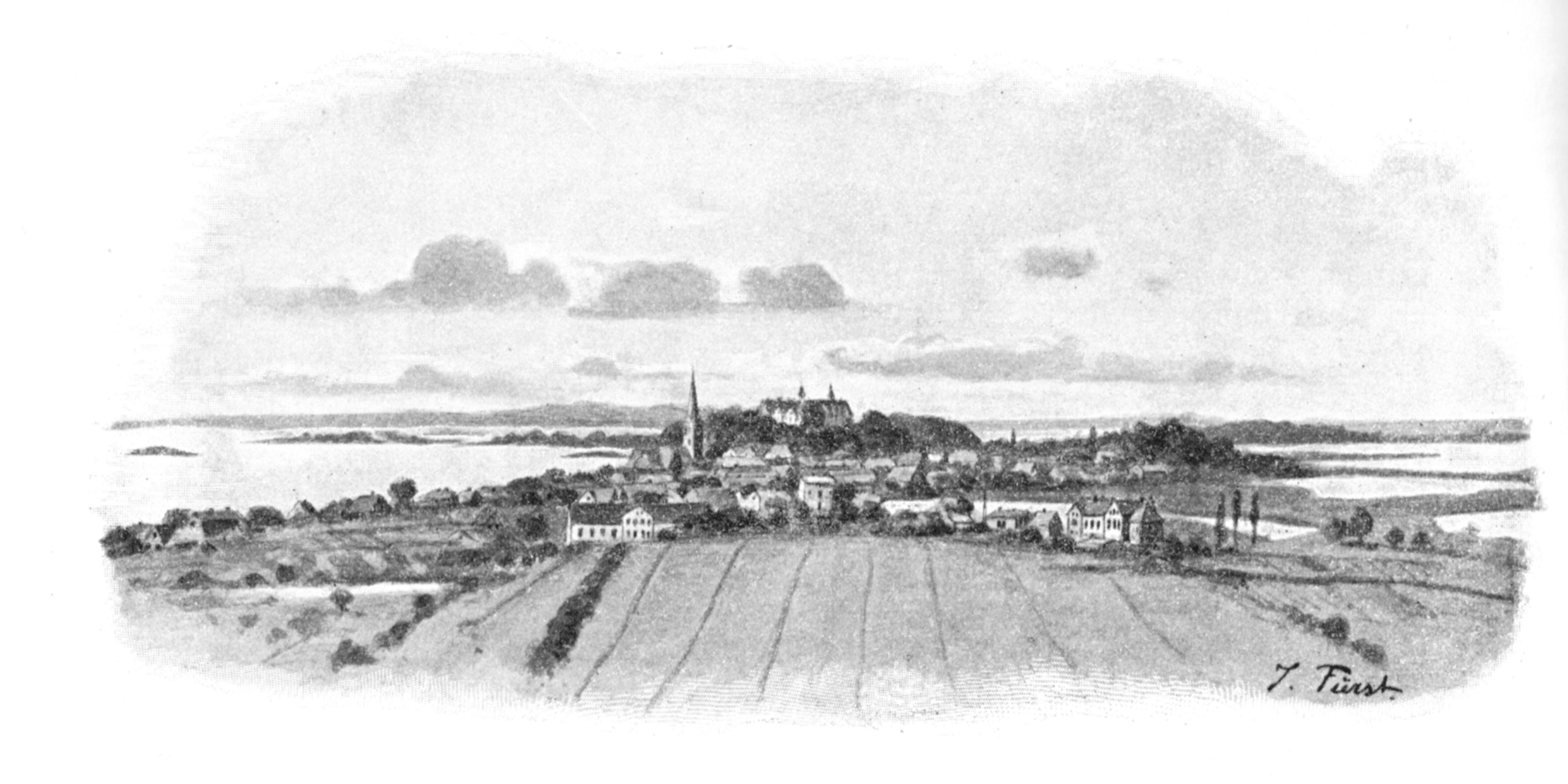
Plön in 1895

In the course of the Migration Period, Slavic tribes entered the region of Plön during the early 7th century following the withdrawal of the original Germanic population. On the large island opposite Plön, which was later called Olsborg, they built a large fortification. They called their settlement Plune, which means "ice-free water".

In 1075, Kruto lured Budivoj of the Nakonids into the "castrum plunense" (according to Helmold of Bosau), laid siege to him, and then once Budivoj's men had given themselves up after Kruto's promises to let them withdraw freely, Kruto had them slain. In 1139 the Count of Holstein, Adolf II of Schauenburg, destroyed the fortress, ending the domination of the Slavs in the region of Plön. Twenty years later, Adolf II had the castle on the island rebuilt, but soon had it moved to the present hill of Schlossberg ("castle hill"). It was here, under the protection of the castle and close to the major trading route from Lübeck to the north, that a Saxon market town emerged.

In 1236, Plön was granted town rights under Lübeck law. Strategically located on a narrow isthmus between the lakes and the River Schwentine, Plön remained a centre of the County of Holstein until the Danish royal house fell in the 15th century.

Between 1561 and 1729, Plön was the capital of the Duchy of Schleswig-Holstein-Sonderburg-Plön. The Duchy of Schleswig-Holstein-Plön emerged in 1622 as a result of succession in the Danish royal house. From 1633 to 1636 a Renaissance castle was built on the site of the old castle by Duke Joachim Ernest, and Plön became the capital of the small but independent princedom. As a residence town Plön experienced a considerable increase in status. For example, in 1685 Duke John Adolphus ("Hans Adolf") founded the new town (Neustadt) northwest of the town in order to settle craftsmen here and thus increase the economic might of the duchy. Under Charles Frederick the castle district was expanded with several baroque buildings and a pleasure garden. At that time the town had about 1,000 inhabitants and reached as far as the bridge over the Schwentine in the east and as far as the end of today's pedestrian zone in the west. Both entrances were protected by gates.

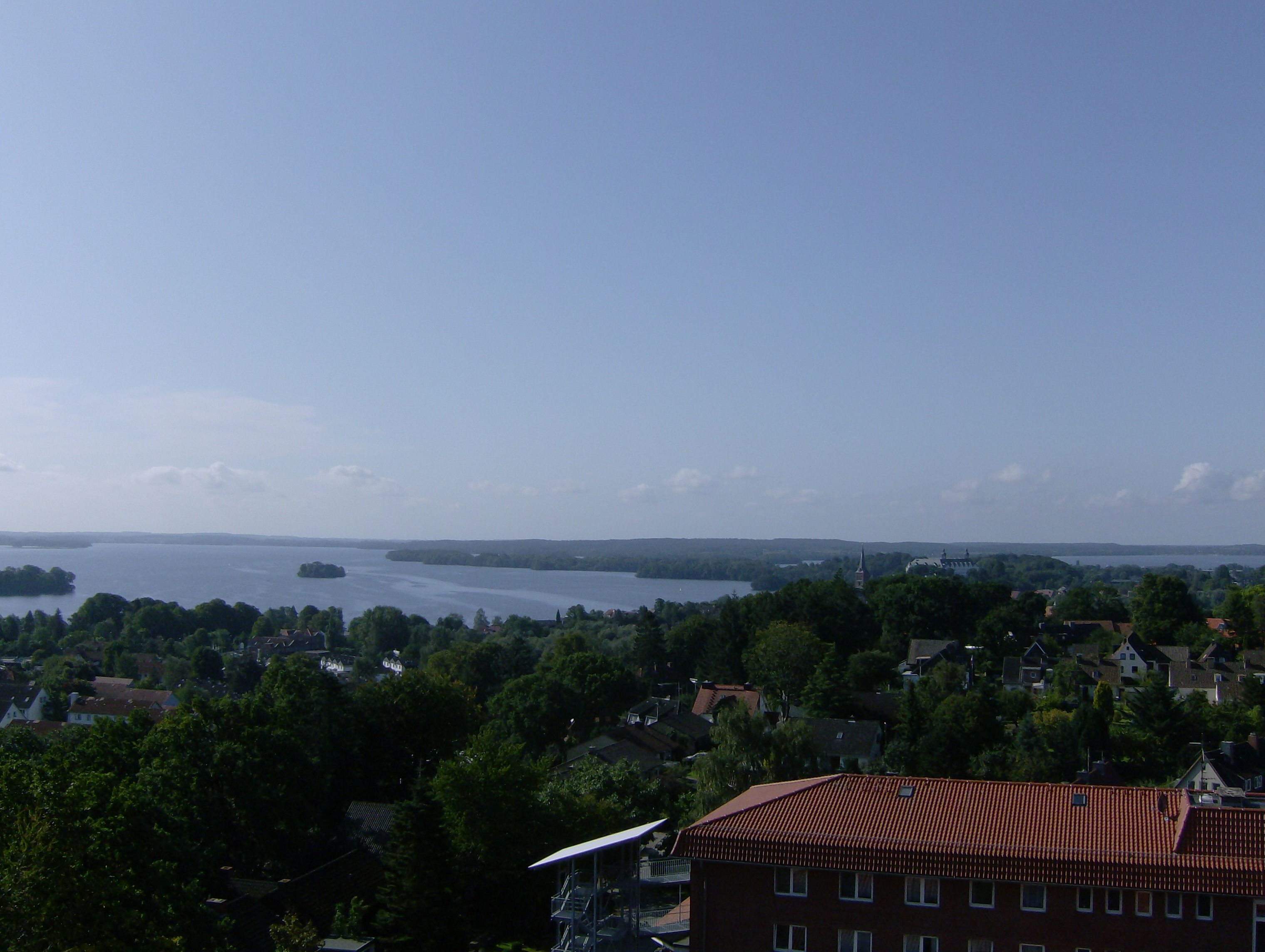
Plön from the Parnass Tower with Plön Lake and Plön Castle in the centre

In 1761 the Duchy fell back into the hands of the Danish crown. Plön remained under Danish rule until the Second Schleswig War in 1864. Although it was the Danish king's summer residence from time to time, it remained otherwise a sleepy provincial town of about 2,000 inhabitants. The cultural life of the minor residence was charmingly described by Rochus von Liliencron in his "Childhood Memories". In the mid-19th century, the Danish crown prince spent a few years of his summer vacation in Plön Castle, since when it has been decorated in white plaster with a gray roof.

In 1867 Plön became a county town following the introduction of Prussian administrative reforms. The Hohenzollern princes were educated for a time in Plön. The Princes' Island (Prinzeninsel) is still owned by the House of Hohenzollern. Since 1868, Plön Castle was a Prussian military school. After World War I it became a boarding school that served as a 1933–1945 as a National Political Institutes of Education. Since 1946, it has again been a state boarding school. After the end of World War II, former NAPOLA pupils were often able to avail themselves of a form of ‘evasive selective memory’ that ultimately cast themselves as victims of the Nazi regime, and allowed them to make their own (sometimes very successful) way in postwar society. During the War, numerous forced laborers lived in Plön and the surrounding area. In the Plön cemetery, eight wooden crosses commemorate people who were probably forced laborers from Eastern Europe. According to a police report, forced laborers who were no longer able to work allegedly 'drowned while going swimming' in the Plöner See.

In 1891 Emil Otto Zacharias founded the first "Biological Station" for freshwater research on German soil on the Plöner See. It was established as a private research institute with the aid of financial support from the Prussian government and several private citizens. After his death, August Thienemann took the lead. Its successor for a long time was the Max Planck Institute of Limnology, now renamed the Max Planck Institute for Evolutionary Biology (see weblinks).

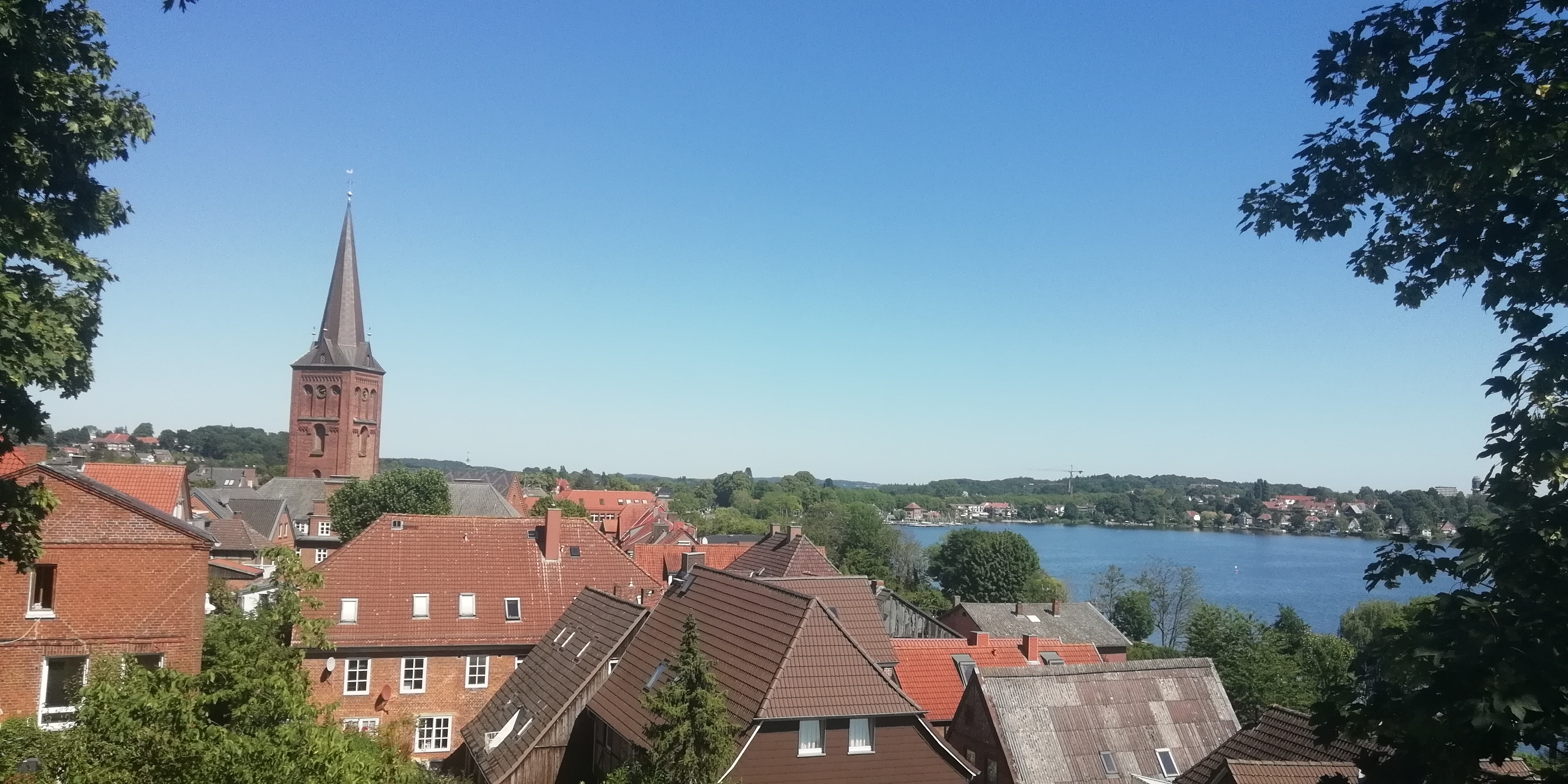
Plön seen from the castle

The Wehrmacht barracks at Stadtheide near Plön became the temporary location of the remaining members of the Hitler cabinet who had fled Berlin after the death of Adolf Hitler on 30 April 1945. Hitler believed that Reichsfuhrer SS Heinrich Himmler was located in Plön and ordered newly appointed Luftwaffe commander Robert Ritter von Greim to fly there to arrest him. However, Himmler had left several hours before Von Greim's arrival.

On 1 May, Commander of the Navy, Admiral Karl Dönitz, moved into the buildings of the Stadtheide Barracks but it was to be a short stay. Dönitz announced that Hitler had fallen and had appointed him as his successor (see Goebbels cabinet). On 2 May Dönitz and the new Government Executive of the Reich fled to Flensburg before the approaching British troops and formed the short-lived Flensburg Government.

After WWII Plon was chosen as the site for King Alfred School, a secondary school for British Forces children under the headmastership of Freddie Spencer Chapman with his staff at the Ruhleben Barracks site, As such the town holds a place of affection with many former pupils across the world and the declining number of surviving teachers and their families. King Alfred School, Plön can rightly claim to be the first fully comprehensive school in the UK system. This school existed from 1948 to 1959. The Ruhleben Barracks site had been the German Navy U-boat training school and has now reverted to a similar function as M.U.S the non-commissioned officer school. The street nearby has a Lighthouse restaurant and down the street is a camping trailer park then a drug abuse hospital and a retirement castle. There are interesting free time activities like canoeing, walking and wandering in the woods or on the great lake.

The German boarding school in Plön Castle was closed in 2001 under the state government of Heide Simonis and the castle was sold to the Fielmann optical company. They re-opened it in October 2006, after extensive restoration work, as a school for opticians. The total cost of refurbishment and reconstruction was 35 million euros. Today it is a non-profit training centre for the whole field of optics. This has strengthened the economy of the town of Plön, which has become more widely known, even internationally. Each year the castle is home to six thousand Fielmann employees who receive training for anything up to a two-week period. Other students at the castle take part in B.A. and master optician courses. The castle has extensive grounds and is one of the most beautiful castles in Schleswig-Holstein. There are several restored historic buildings - such as the Princes' House (Prinzenhaus), Old Swimming Baths (Alte Schwimmhalle), Clock House (Uhrenhaus) - as well as shady avenues and old trees open to the public to stroll through and explore. Parts of Günther Fielmann's own antique collection can be viewed at the castle; it encompasses pieces from the major north European and French epochs since the mid-seventeenth century.

The Princes' House is affectionately called the "Pearl of the Rococo Period". It was previously used as a summer house and was given its present name when the sons of the last German Emperor, William II were taught in this building. After several years of restoration, it is now again open to the public. The Uhrenhaus now contains the information centre for the Holstein Switzerland Nature Park. The former imperial swimming pool is now a cultural forum, which is available for events and exhibitions. Evidence of the imperial era is still visible in many parts of Plon. For example, there is on the Princes' Island, a thatched pavilion, from where there is a view of the Great Plön Lake - this was a favourite haunt of the Empress. In the chapel at the Old Cemetery is an altar donated by Empress Augusta Victoria.

Relics of the Cold War can be found in the form of explosive vehicle traps along the Fünf-Seen-Allee ("Five Lake Lane") near the old Five Lake Barracks (formerly home to the 6th Engineer Battalion (Pionierbataillon 6) and 6th Panzergrenadier Division), in Plön-Stadtheide.

== Politics ==
=== Town council ===
Plön's town council consists of 23 councillors.

	CDU	SPD	FWG-Plön	Die Grünen	FDP	Total
2013	8	7	4	3	1	23 seats

(as of municipal election in May 2013)

=== Mayor ===
After a runoff on 21 November 2004 Jens Paustian became Plön's mayor. The current mayor, Lars Winter, was elected in 2006.

=== Coat of arms ===
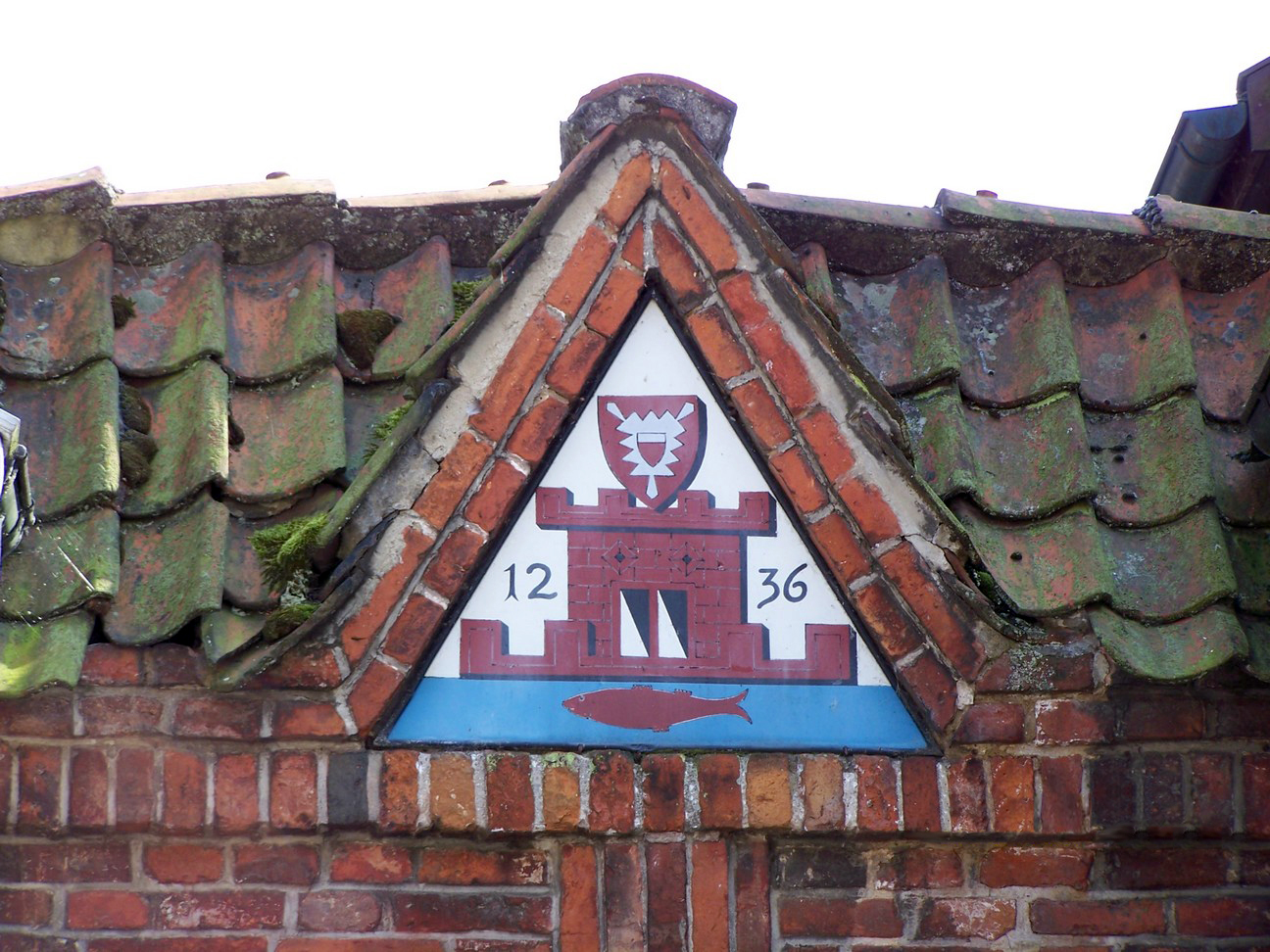
Old coat of arms at the gate from Lange Straße to the castle

The coat of arms shows on a silver background above silver and blue waves in which a red fish is swimming, a red, full-width, low crenellated wall made of bricks, on top of which is a short, red crenellated tower with two black window arches; over the tower hovers Holstein's coat of arms (in red a silver nettle leaf)

=== Partnerships ===
- (Germany) Plau am See, Mecklenburg-Vorpommern, since 1990
- A sponsorship arrangement also exists with the town of Zhilino (formerly the German town of Schillen) in the old Tilsit-Ragnit district in Russia's Kaliningrad Oblast, in what was once East Prussia.
- Ksour Essef, Tunisia, since 1969
- Plöns Kreis is the partnership of Lääne-Virumaa county in Estonia

== Transport ==
The railway line between Kiel and Lübeck, on which trains run half-hourly in each direction, runs through Plön. Plön station became known Germany-wide as a result of the early evening television series, Kleinstadtbahnhof ("small town station"), which was filmed here and starred Heidi Kabel and Gustav Knuth. In the series the town was called "Lüttin".

The town is a highway hub, being on the junction of the federal roads (Bundesstraßen) B 76 (east-west) and B 430 (southwest-northeast).

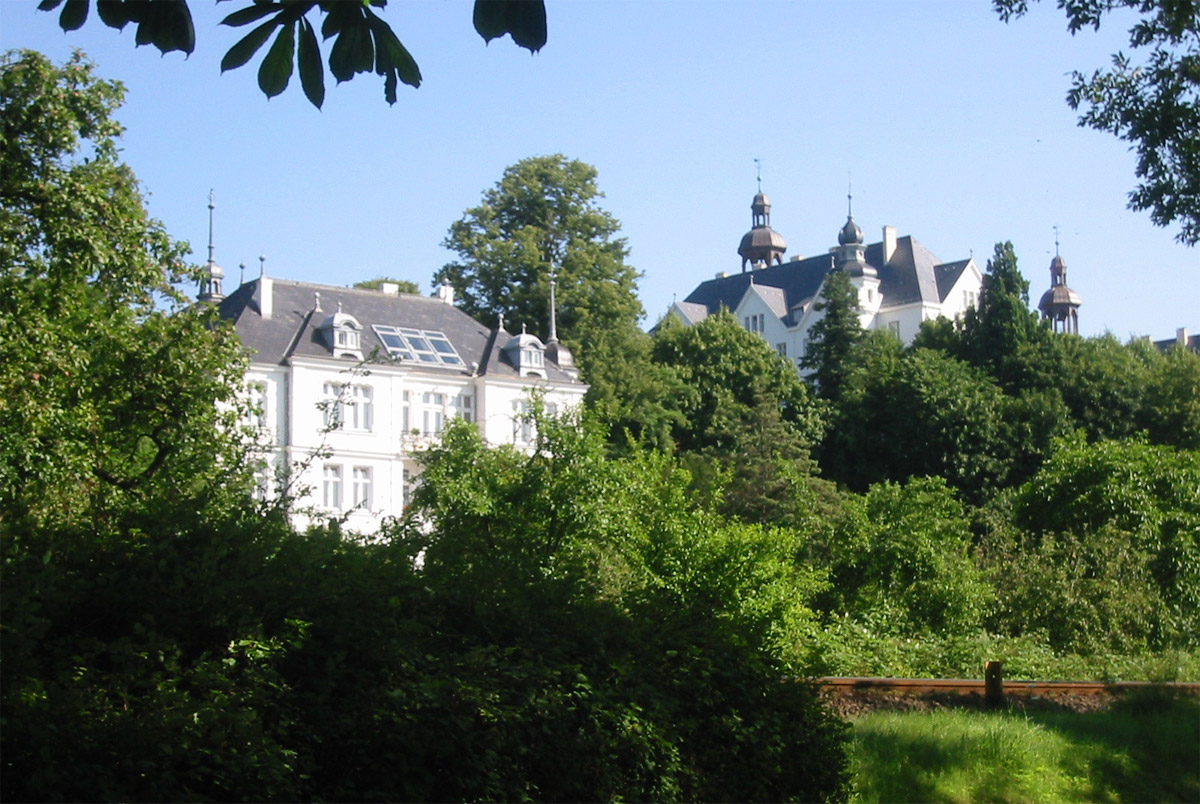
Plön Castle seen from the Plöner See

== Suburbs ==
The village of Koppelsberg lies on the B 430 to the west of the town. The village of Sandkaten (municipality of Bösdorf) and the new suburb of Stadtheide lie on the B 76 to the east of the town. Most of Stadtheide is built on the newly reclaimed terrain of the old engineer barracks.

== Culture ==
=== Places of interest ===
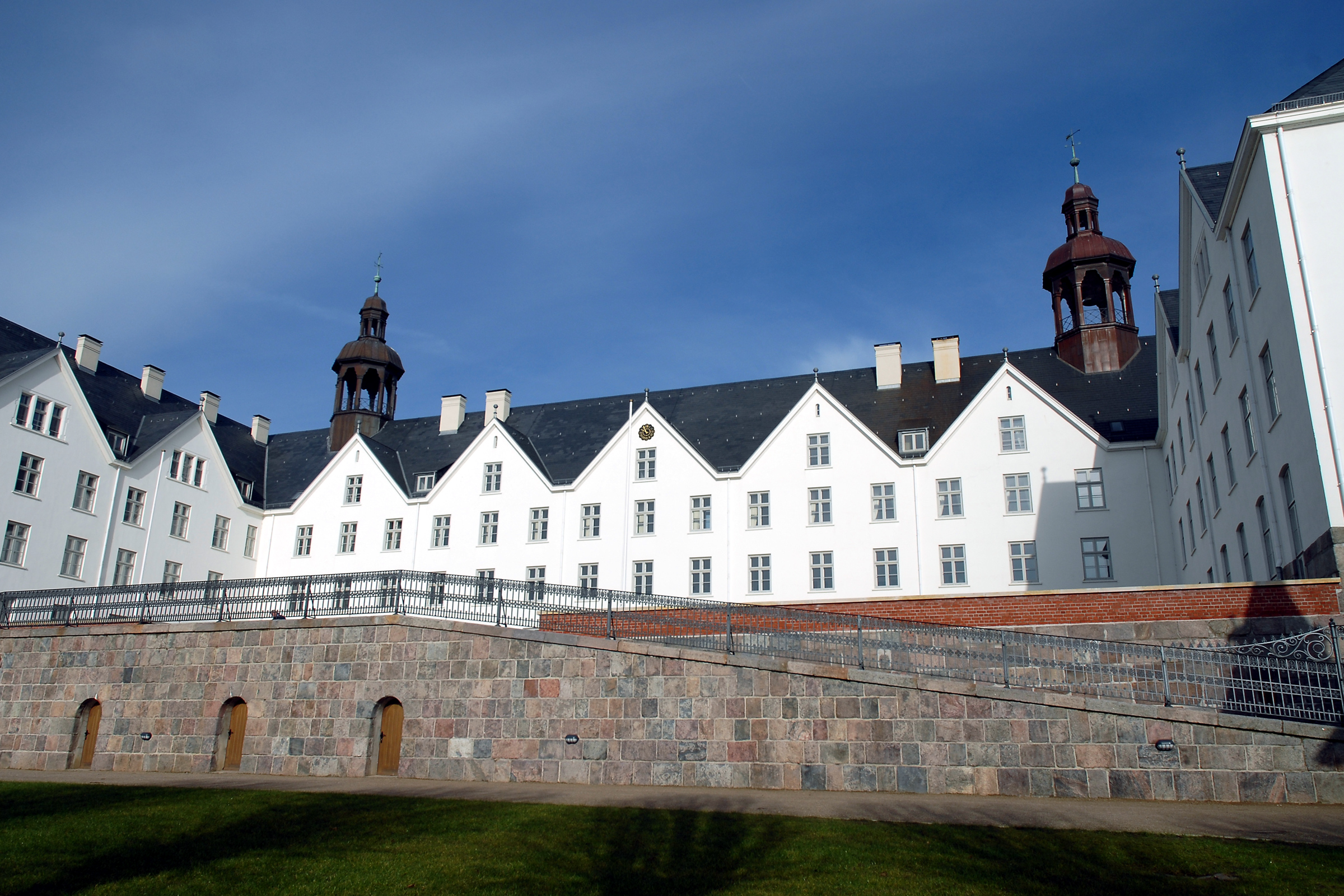
Plön Castle

==== Plön Castle ====
Plön Castle is one of the most important Renaissance buildings in the country. Until the death of Duke Frederick Charles of Schleswig-Holstein-Plön in 1761 it was the ducal Residenz; thereafter it was used for various purposes. Today it is owned by the firm of Fielmann.

==== Parnass Tower ====
The Parnass Tower is a 20-metre-high, steel lattice tower on a stone plinth erected in 1888 as an observation tower by the Plön Tourism Society (Plöner Verschönerungsverein). It is open from April to October.

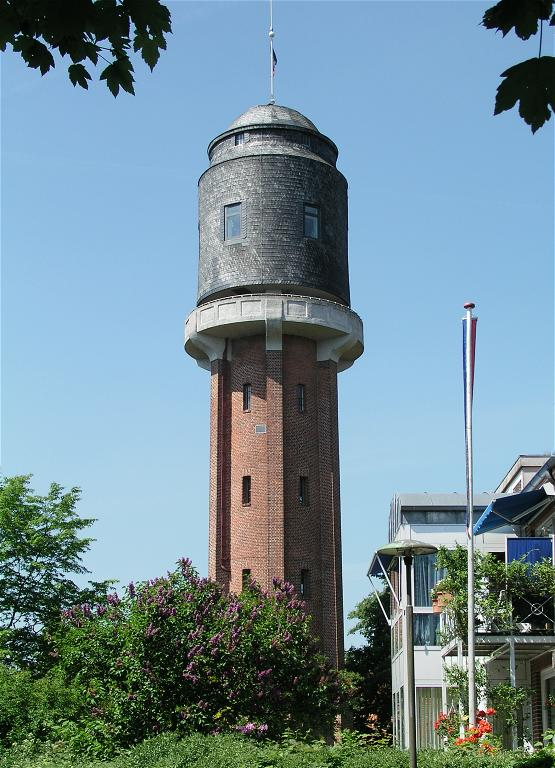
Plön Water Tower of 1913

==== Water tower ====
The old Plön Water Tower (Wasserturm Plön) of 1913 lies in the east of the town and is used today as a residence.

=== Planet Walk ===
On Plön's Planet Walk the Solar System is mapped on a scale of 1:2,000,000,000, starting from a symbol of the Sun on the landing stage on Market Bridge.

=== Museums ===
Museums in Plön include the Museum of Plön District with its North German glass collection, the Nature Park House, the Plön Princes' House (Prinzenhaus) and the Fritz-During Foundation in Plön District.

=== Krieglstein Puppet Theatre ===
Opposite the Max Planck Institute for Evolutionary Biology (until 2007: the MPI for Limnology) is the Krieglstein Puppet Theatre. Ute Krieglstein designed the yarn dolls, including the set and plays songs, composed by her, with her husband, Gerd, who is responsible for the technology. After years as a touring company in Germany, in other European countries and several guest performances in South Korea their company, "Puppen & Co", has had a permanent venue in Plön since 2000.

=== Literature: "Wonderful times in Wonderful Plön" ===
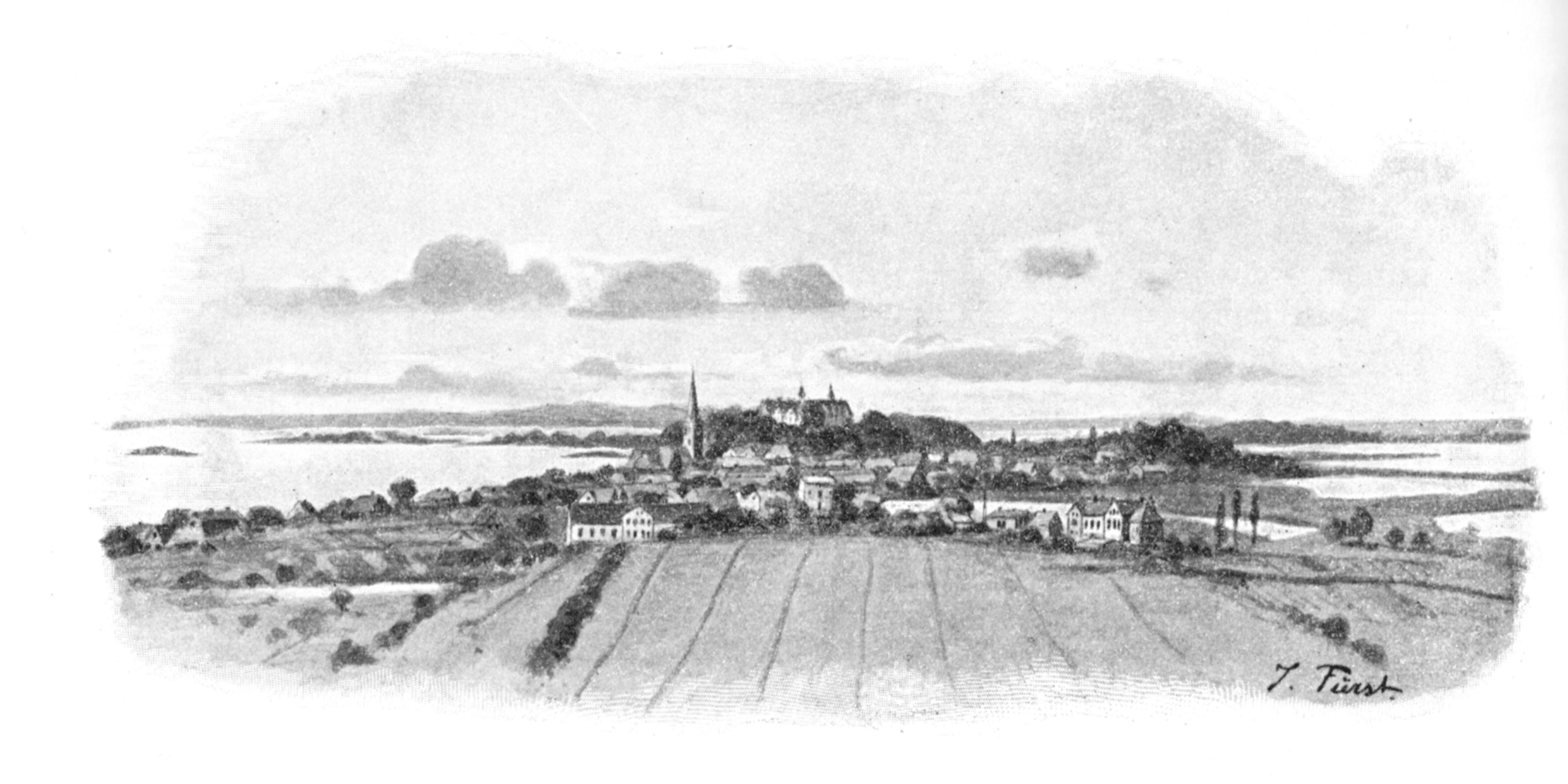
Plön around 1895

My romantic attachment began, of course, in the cradle, shaped by the whole course of those early days. It grew stronger, not least through the nourishment it received from the romantic beauty of Plön and its countryside. The little town nestles, surrounded by lakes, on a narrow strip of land encircling the low hill, whose heights are occupied by the old ducal palace, ringed by old trees, avenues and terraced, sloping gardens. Around the sprawling waters of the lakes, which can be seen from above in a single sweeping gaze, runs a belt of beautiful beech forest over serries of hills, interspersed with a gay, fertile landscape. When, in the evening of a bright summer's day, the moon casts its beams over the gently stirring waves of the lake surface, what a wonderful decoration to play romantic games with the heart over the terraces and under the old trees…" ~ Rochus von Liliencron, 1902, in his Jugenderinnerungen ("Memories of Childhood")

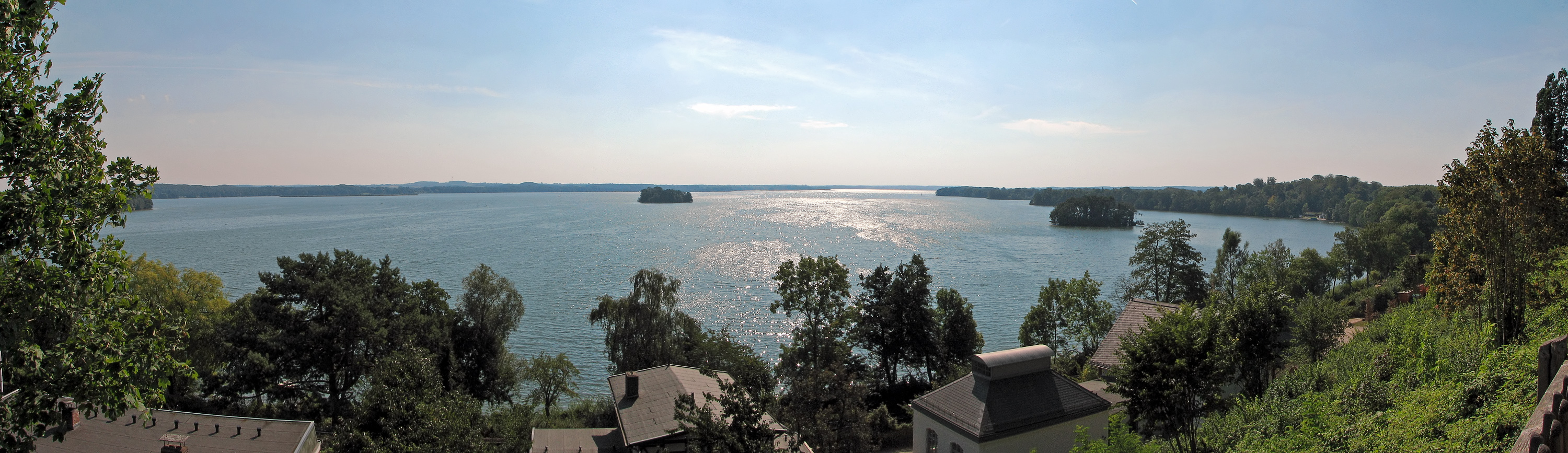
A panorama of the Großer Plöner See looking south. In clear weather the castle at Nehmten may be seen. In the foreground between the buildings and the lakeshore runs the Kiel-Lübeck railway: left (east) towards the Hanseatic town of Lübeck, and right (west) towards Kiel, the capital of Schleswig-Holstein.

== Notable people ==
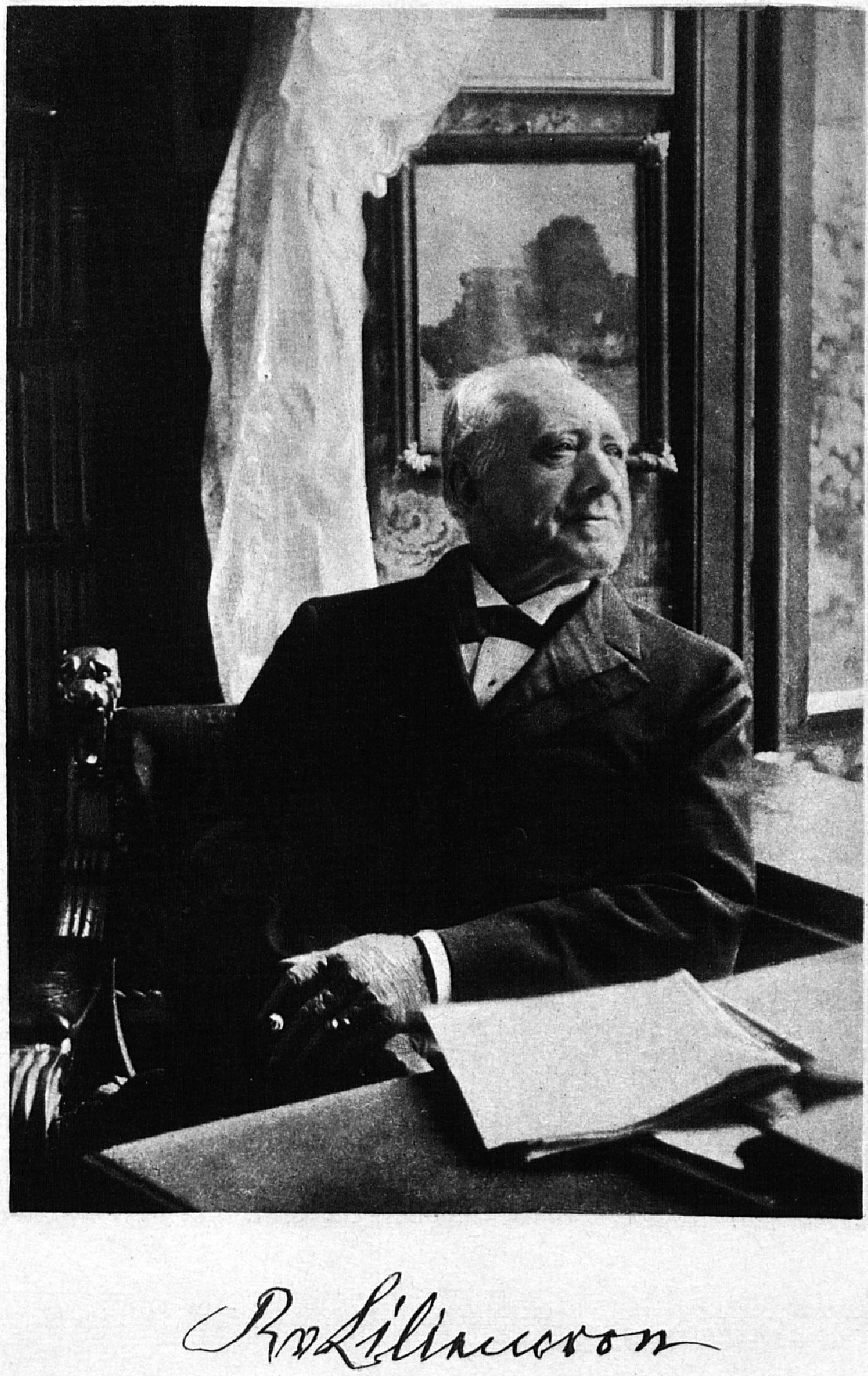
Rochus von Liliencron

- Georg Michael Telemann (1748–1831), church musician and composer
- Friedrich Carl Gröger (1766–1838), portrait painter and lithographer
- Rochus von Liliencron (1820–1912), Germanist, music historian and editor of the Allgemeine Deutsche Biographie
- Karl Christian Bruhns (1830–1881), astronomer
- Georg Kuphaldt (1853–1938), gardener, landscape architect, dendrologist,
- Karl von Graffen (1893–1964), general lieutenant in the Second World War
- Karl Mauss (1898–1959), officer and general
- Lauritz Lauritzen (1910–1980), politician 8(SPD)
- Nick St. Nicholas (born 1943), Bass player American Rock Band Steppenwolf
