= Deaths in April 1999 =

The following is a list of notable deaths in April 1999.

Entries for each day are listed alphabetically by surname. A typical entry lists information in the following sequence:

- Name, age, country of citizenship at birth, subsequent country of citizenship (if applicable), reason for notability, cause of death (if known), and reference.

== April 1999 ==
=== 1 ===
- Ellis Yarnal Berry, 96, American attorney, newspaper publisher and politician, member of the United States House of Representatives (1951-1971).
- Gladys Hasty Carroll, 94, American novelist.
- Stipe Delić, 73, Croatian film director.
- Tony Frasca, 71, American ice hockey player and coach, stomach cancer.
- Alfred Jahn, 83, Polish geographer, geomorphologist and polar explorer.
- Tadahito Mochinaga, 80, Japanese stop-motion animator.
- Madhurantakam Rajaram, 68, Indian author.
- George Rapée, 83, American bridge player.
- Wilson Riles, 81, American educator and politician.
- Jesse Stone, 97, American R&B musician and songwriter.

=== 2 ===
- Andrew Gardner, 66, British newscaster, heart attack.
- Julio Alberto Hernández, 98, Dominican composer and pianist.
- Sophie Lihau-Kanza, 59, Congolese politician and sociologist, cardiac arrest.
- Charlie Mitchell, 78, American gridiron football player (Chicago Bears, Green Bay Packers).
- Josip Pokupec, 85, Yugoslav Olympic cyclist (1936).

=== 3 ===
- Lionel Bart, 68, British music writer, composer and lyricist (Oliver!, Living Doll), cancer.
- John B. Daly, 69, American politician.
- Herman Foster, 70, American bebop jazz pianist.
- Björgvin Hólm, 64, Icelandic Olympic athlete (1960).
- Traian Iordache, 87, Romanian football player and coach.
- Evelyn Lambart, 84, Canadian animator and director.
- Aldona Nenėnienė, 49, Soviet/Lithuanian handball player and Olympic champion (1976, 1980).
- Geoffrey Walsh, 89, Canadian general.

=== 4 ===
- Manuel Bernardo Aguirre, 90, Mexican politician.
- Karl Barufka, 77, German footballer.
- Faith Domergue, 74, American actress, cancer.
- Jumabek Ibraimov, 55, Kyrgyz politician, stomach cancer.
- Vane Ivanović, 85, Yugoslav-British Olympic athlete (1936), political activist, diplomat and writer.
- Lucille Lortel, 98, American actress, artistic director and theatrical producer.
- Frank Charles McGee, 73, Canadian businessman and politician.
- Vladimir Orlov, 77, Soviet politician.
- Bob Peck, 53, British actor (Jurassic Park, Edge of Darkness, Lord of the Flies), cancer.
- Eric Ramsay, 82, Australian politician.
- Ambroise Roux, 77, French businessman and political advisor, heart attack.
- Early Wynn, 79, American Hall of Fame baseball player (Washington Senators, Cleveland Indians, Chicago White Sox).

=== 5 ===
- Paul David, 79, Canadian cardiologist and politician.
- Oleksiy Demyanyuk, 40, Soviet Ukrainian high jumper and Olympian (1980).
- Giulio Einaudi, 87, Italian book publisher.
- Chester E. McCarty, 93, American officer and pilot in the US Air Force.
- John Wiles, 73, South African novelist, television writer and producer (Doctor Who).

=== 6 ===
- Tibor Bedekovits, 68, Hungarian Olympic rower (1960).
- Gene Benson, 85, American baseball player.
- Inge Braumüller, 89, German high jumper and Olympian (1928).
- Hienadz Karpienka, 49, Belarusian scientist and politician opposing president Alexander Lukashenko, stroke.
- Robert D. Lindsay, 79, Canadian politician.
- Red Norvo, 91, American jazz musician known as "Mr. Swing".
- William Pleeth, 83, British cellist.
- Rosaire Smith, 85, Canadian weightlifter and Olympian (1948, 1952).
- Angus Ellis Taylor, 87, American mathematician and academic.

=== 7 ===
- Ivan Diviš, 74, Czech poet and essayist, fall.
- Heinz Lehmann, 87, German-born Canadian psychiatrist known as the "father of modern psychopharmacology".
- Angus Paton, 93, British civil engineer.
- Herbert Schibukat, 84, German Olympic ice hockey player (1936, 1952).
- Bob Tough, 78, American basketball player.
- Arnold Wientjes, 60, Dutch Olympic rower (1960).

=== 8 ===
- Pipaluk Freuchen, 81, Danish-Greenlandic-Swedish writer.
- Vic Fisher, 74, Australian rules footballer.
- Luis Castro Leiva, 56, Venezuelan academic, writer and columnist, brain haemorrhage.
- Fritz Tegtmeier, 81, German Luftwaffe flying ace during World War II.

=== 9 ===
- George Sidney Bishop, 85, British civil servant and businessman.
- Clay Bryant, 87, American Major League Baseball player (Chicago Cubs).
- Bert Firman, 93, English bandleader.
- Raúl Silva Henríquez, 91, Chilean prelate of the Catholic Church.
- Jerold Hoffberger, 80, American businessman.
- Marcel Lihau, 67, Congolese politician, jurist, and law professor.
- Mary Lutyens, 90, British author.
- Ibrahim Baré Maïnassara, 49, Nigerien military officer, shot.
- Albert Popwell, 72, American actor (Dirty Harry, Cleopatra Jones, Search), complications following open heart surgery.
- Geoffrey Wigoder 76, British-born Israeli historian, broadcaster, academic and encyclopedist.

=== 10 ===
- Roger Cuche, 70, Swiss Olympic boxer (1952).
- John Ngu Foncha, 82, Cameroonian politician.
- Heinz Fraenkel-Conrat, 88, Polish-American biochemist, lung failure.
- Charles Green, 85, South African-British RAF fighter pilot during World War II and Olympic medalist in bobsledding.
- Brownie Mary, 76, American medical cannabis rights activist, heart attack.
- James D. McCawley, 61, Scottish-American linguist.
- Tu'i Pelehake, 77, Tonga royal and politician, Prime Minister.
- Thakazhi Sivasankara Pillai, 86, Indian novelist and short story writer.
- Jean Vander Pyl, 79, American voice actress (The Flintstones, The Jetsons, Top Cat), lung cancer.
- Ali Sayad Shirazi, 54, Iranian army officer, assassinated.
- Thornton Wilson, 78, American chairman and CEO of Boeing corporation.

=== 11 ===
- Gábor Alapy, 86, Hungarian rower and Olympian (1936).
- William H. Armstrong, 87, American children's writer.
- Tom Bane, 85, American politician.
- Pete Milne, 74, American baseball player (New York Giants).
- Agim Ramadani, 35, Kosovar Albanian commander of the Kosovo Liberation Army, killed in action.
- Slavko Ćuruvija, 49, Serbian journalist and newspaper publisher, shot.

=== 12 ===
- Ricardo Barreiro, 49, Argentine comic book writer, esophageal cancer.
- Mario Cevasco, 60, Italian water polo player and Olympian (1964, 1968, 1972).
- José Francisco de Morais, 49, Brazilian football player.
- Alan Evans, 49, Welsh darts player.
- Hugo Fernando, 86, Sri Lankan actor and composer.
- Carlos Jaschek, 73, German-Argentine astrophysicist.
- Marion Albert Pruett, 49, American spree killer, execution by lethal injection.
- Cliff Ross, 70, American baseball player (Cincinnati Redlegs).
- Boxcar Willie, 67, American country music singer-songwriter, leukemia.

=== 13 ===
- Edith Anderson, 83, American journalist, writer and translator.
- James M. Clarke, 81, American farmer and politician, member of the United States House of Representatives (1983-1985, 1987-1991).
- Knut Hauge, 87, Norwegian writer.
- Rudolf Homberger, 89, Swiss rower and Olympian (1936).
- Masaji Kiyokawa, 86, Japanese sports administrator and Olympic medalist (1932, 1936), pancreatic cancer.
- Don McGuire, 80, American actor, director, screenwriter, and producer.
- Walter H. Moeller, 89, American politician, member of the United States House of Representatives (1959-1963, 1965-1967).
- Sheik Chinna Moulana, 74, Indian nadhaswaram player.
- Helmut Radach, 84, German Olympic rower (1936).
- Ortvin Sarapu, 75, Estonian-New Zealand chess player.
- Willi Stoph, 84, East German politician.
- Visakha Wijeyeratne, 64, Sri Lankan painter, sculptor, writer and social worker.

=== 14 ===
- Ellen Corby, 87, American actress (The Waltons, Vertigo, Shane), Emmy winner (1973), stroke.
- Anthony Newley, 67, British singer-songwriter and actor, kidney cancer.
- Robert G. Sachs, 82, American theoretical physicist.
- Aubrey Schenck, 90, American film producer, his film career was launched with the moderate success of his psychological horror film Shock! (1946)
- Brigitte Steden, 50, German badminton player and Olympian (1972).
- Werner Stumm, 74, Swiss chemist.
- Nicola Trussardi, 56, Italian fashion designer, traffic collision.
- Bill Wendell, 75, American television announcer, complications from cancer.

=== 15 ===
- Hermann Biechele, 81, German politician and member of the Bundestag.
- Roy Chiao, 72, British Hong Kong-era Chinese actor, heart failure.
- Aaron Esterson, 75, British psychiatrist.
- K. R. Srinivasa Iyengar, 90, Indian writer in English.
- F. Burton Jones, 88, American mathematician.
- Harvey Postlethwaite, 55, British Formula One team technical director, heart attack.
- Bernie Snyder, 85, American baseball player (Philadelphia Athletics).

=== 16 ===
- Kaoru Betto, 78, Japanese baseball player.
- Regis Cordic, 72, American radio personality and actor.
- Vincent J. Dellay, 91, American politician, member of the United States House of Representatives (1957-1959).
- Tony DeLuca, 38, American football player (Green Bay Packers).
- Osmund Faremo, 77, Norwegian politician.
- Rudi Fehr, 87, German-born American film editor (Dial M for Murder, Prizzi's Honor, Key Largo), heart attack.
- Zoë Lund, 37, American musician, model, actress, producer and screenwriter, cocaine-induced heart failure.
- Charles McKimson, 84, American animator.
- Manuel Ordovás, 86, Spanish Olympic equestrian (1952).
- Abbott Pattison, 82, American sculptor and abstract artist.
- Karl Schefold, 94, Swiss archaeologist.
- Skip Spence, 52, American singer-songwriter (Jefferson Airplane, Moby Grape), lung cancer.
- Margaret Tait, 80, Scottish film maker and poet.
- Alberto Torres, 65, Dominican sprinter and Olympian (1964, 1968).
- Gordon Watson, 78, Australian classical pianist.

=== 17 ===
- Julian Cole, 74, American mathematician.
- Ahmad Mohamed Ibrahim, 82, Singaporean lawyer and law professor.
- Georges Miez, 94, Swiss gymnast, cerebrovascular disease.
- Richard Negri, 71, British theatre director and designer.
- Nicky Virachkul, 50, American darts player, cancer.

=== 18 ===
- Sam Barber, 79, American baseball player.
- Alan Brazier, 74, English cricket player.
- Vicente Escrivá, 85, Spanish film director, producer and screenwriter.
- Ye Fei, 84, Filipino-Chinese general and politician.
- Tony Gallovich, 81, American football player (Cleveland Rams).
- Enrique Hormazábal, 68, Chilean football player.
- Robert Irving, 51, English rugby player, heart attack.
- Gert Jeschonnek, 86, German naval officer.
- Setsuko Migishi, 94, Japanese Yōga painter.
- Herman Miller, 79, American film writer and producer.
- Gian-Carlo Rota, 66, Italian-American mathematician and philosopher.
- Raghubir Singh, 56, Indian photographer, heart attack.

=== 19 ===
- Stanley T. Adams, 76, United States Army officer, Alzheimer's disease.
- Hermine Braunsteiner, 79, German Nazi concentration camp guard.
- Margaret Campbell, 86, Politician in Ontario, Canada.
- Flora Carabella, 73, Italian actress, bone cancer.
- Calvin Favron, 41, American football player (St. Louis Cardinals).
- Mario Gentili, 86, Italian Olympic cyclist (1936).
- Shay Gorman, 76, Irish actor.
- Charles Patrick Green, 85, South African-born British RAF pilot, bobsledder, and Olympian (1936).
- Juan Lavenás, 84, Argentine Olympic sprinter (1936).
- Helen Lundeberg, 90, American painter, pneumonia.
- Ray Magee, 81, Australian Olympic weightlifter (1948).
- Arthur Morton, 84, American football player and coach.
- Yoko Tani, 70, Japanese actress and nightclub entertainer, cancer.

=== 20 ===
- Flash Hollett, 88, Canadian ice hockey player.
- James Cullen Martin, 71, American chemist.
- Reginald O'Brien, 73, Australian politician.
- Nikos Rizos, 74, Greek actor, edema, heart attack.
- Bethsabée de Rothschild, 84, French philanthropist and member of the Rothschild family.
- Rick Rude, 40, professional wrestler, heart failure following accidental overdose.
- Cenobio Ruiz, 65, Mexican Olympic cyclist (1960).
- Señor Wences, 103, Spanish ventriloquist.
- Charles E. Whittingham, 86, American racehorse trainer.
- Students killed in the Columbine High School massacre:
  - Cassie Bernall, 17, victim.
  - Eric Harris, 18, perpetrator.
  - Dylan Klebold, 17, perpetrator.
  - Rachel Scott, 17, victim.

=== 21 ===
- Tim Forster, 65, British racehorse trainer.
- Georges Miez, 94, Swiss gymnast and Olympian (1924, 1928, 1932, 1936).
- Phillip Omondi, 42, Ugandan football player and manager.
- Ralph Perk, 85, American politician.
- Charles "Buddy" Rogers, 94, American actor and jazz musician.
- Mandayani Jeersannidhi Thirumalachar, 84, Indian mycologist, microbiologist and plant pathologist.
- Liz Tilberis, 51, British fashion magazine editor, ovarian cancer.
- Su Xuelin, 102, Chinese author and scholar.

=== 22 ===
- Ida Anak Agung Gde Agung, 77, Indonesian politician.
- Bill Bowen, 70, American politician.
- Joseph W.S. deGraft-Johnson, 65, Ghanaian engineer, academic and politician.
- Munir Ahmad Khan, 72, Pakistani nuclear engineer and physicist, complications following heart surgery.
- Constantino Miranda, 74, Spanish Olympic Olympic runner (1948).
- Jean-Claude Molinari, 67, French tennis player.
- Bernard Newman, 91, American judge.
- Apostolos Nikolaidis, 60, Greek singer, cancer.
- Bert Remsen, 74, American actor (McCabe & Mrs. Miller, Nashville, It's a Living).
- Z. A. Suleri, Pakistani political journalist, author and activist, heart failure.
- Anne Szumigalski, 77, Canadian poet.

=== 23 ===
- Maria Àngels Anglada, 69, Catalan poet and novelist.
- Dana Childs, 76, American politician, lawyer and jurist, heart attack.
- Melba Liston, 73, American jazz trombonist, arranger and composer.
- Aleksandr Prokofyevich Markevich, 94, Ukrainian zoologist, helminthologist and copepodologist.
- Tullio Pandolfini, 84, Italian water polo player and Olympic champion (1948).
- Francis J. Pettijohn, 94, American geologist.
- M. V. Rajamma, 78, Indian actress, singer and movie producer.
- Roger Rio, 86, French football player.
- Philip Stratford, 71, Canadian translator, professor and poet.
- Celso Torrelio, 65, Bolivian military general and member of the Junta.
- István Tóth, 60, Hungarian Olympic boxer (1964).

=== 24 ===
- Nanabhai Bhatt, 83, Indian Bollywood film director and producer, heart failure.
- Arthur Boyd, 78, Australian painter.
- Walter J. Cummings Jr., 82, American solicitor general and circuit judge (United States Court of Appeals for the Seventh Circuit).
- Ray Evans, 76, American football player (Pittsburgh Steelers).
- Don Nolander, 77, American gridiron football player (Los Angeles Dons).
- Charles Rostaing, 94, French linguist.
- Don Schofield, 68, Australian rugby player.

=== 25 ===
- Roman Hruska, 94, American politician, complications following a broken hip.
- Kemistry, 35, British drum and bass DJ, traffic collision.
- Rupert Lonsdale, 93, British submarine commander and prisoner of war during World War II.
- Michael Morris, 3rd Baron Killanin, 84, Irish journalist, author and Olympic official.
- William McCrea, 94, English astronomer and mathematician.
- Martti Simojoki, 90, Finnish archbishop .
- Roger Troutman, 47, American musician, producer and founder of Zapp and Roger, fratricide, fusillade.
- Michi Weglyn, 72, American author.

=== 26 ===
- Man Mohan Adhikari, 78, 31st Prime Minister of Nepal.
- Adrian Borland, 41, British singer (The Sound), suicide by train.
- Jill Dando, 37, British journalist and television presenter (Crimewatch), shot.
- Trilicia Gunawardena, 65, Sri Lankan actress and singer.
- Faye Throneberry, 67, American baseball player (Boston Red Sox, Washington Senators, Los Angeles Angels).

=== 27 ===
- Arbit Blatas, 90, Lithuanian artist and sculptor.
- Dominick L. DiCarlo, 71, American lawyer and politician, heart attack.
- Al Hirt, 76, American trumpeter and bandleader, liver failure.
- Peter Jackson, 87, British cricket player.
- Pavel Klushantsev, 89, Russian cameraman, film director, producer, screenwriter and author.
- Rolf Landauer, 72, German-born American physicist, brain cancer.
- He Luting, 95, Chinese composer.
- Antonio Merayo, 89, Argentine cinematographer.
- Enrique Sáinz, 81, Spanish Olympic field hockey player (1948).
- Maria Stader, 87, Hungarian-Swiss lyric soprano.
- Cyril Washbrook, 84, English cricketer.
- Mark Weiser, 46, American computer scientist, liver failure.

=== 28 ===
- Brandon Burlsworth, 22, American football player, traffic collision.
- Rory Calhoun, 76, American film and television actor, screenwriter and producer, diabetes.
- Osvaldo Civile, 40, Argentine heavy metal guitarist (V8, Horcas).
- Mien Duchateau, 94, Dutch Olympic middle-distance runner (1928).
- Joe Foreman, 63, Canadian sprinter and Olympian (1956).
- Jean-Blaise Kololo, 47, Congolese politician and diplomat.
- Alf Ramsey, 79, British football player and manager (Ipswich Town, England), Alzheimer's disease and prostate cancer.
- Arthur Leonard Schawlow, 77, American physicist and co-inventor of the laser with Charles Townes, leukemia.
- John Stears, 64, British special effects artist (Star Wars, Thunderball, The Mask of Zorro), Oscar winner (1966, 1978), stroke.
- Donald E. Stewart, 69, American screenwriter (Missing, The Hunt for Red October, Patriot Games), Oscar winner (1983), cancer.
- Roderick Thorp, 62, American novelist (Nothing Lasts Forever), heart attack.
- Arvo Viitanen, 75, Finnish cross-country skier and Olympic medalist (1956).
- Harold Wellman, 90, English-New Zealand geologist.

=== 29 ===
- Léon Barzin, 98, Belgian-American conductor.
- Les Bennett, 81, English football player.
- Barbara Bevege, 56, New Zealand cricket player.
- Faustin Birindwa, Prime Minister of Zaire (1993 – 1994), heart attack.
- Gastone Cerato, 98, Italian Olympic rower (1924).
- Bernhard Cuiper, 85, German Olympic basketball player (1936).
- Mohan Gokhale, 45, Indian actor, heart attack.
- Lojze Kozar, 88, Slovene Roman Catholic priest, writer, and translator.
- Oscar Ljung, 89, Swedish film actor.
- Elspeth March, 88, English actress.
- Ovídio Martins, 70, Cape Verdean poet and journalist.
- Zabihollah Safa, 87, Iranian scholar.
- Kidar Sharma, 89, Indian film director, producer and screenwriter.
- Yao Xueyin, 88, Chinese novelist.

=== 30 ===
- Bruce Jesson, New Zealand journalist, author and political figure, cancer.
- Jessica Lal, 34, Indian model, shot.
- Rikuo Nemoto, 72, Japanese baseball catcher and manager in the Nippon Professional Baseball.
- Jack Schiff, 89, American comic book writer and editor (Batman, Superman, Superboy).
- Darrell Sweet, 51, English drummer (Nazareth), heart attack.
