= Aleksy Antkiewicz =

Polish boxer (1923–2005)

Medal record

Men's Boxing

Representing Poland

Olympic Games
Silver medal – second place	1952 Helsinki	Lightweight
Bronze medal – third place	1948 London	Featherweight

European Amateur Championships
Silver medal – second place	1953 Warsaw	Lightweight

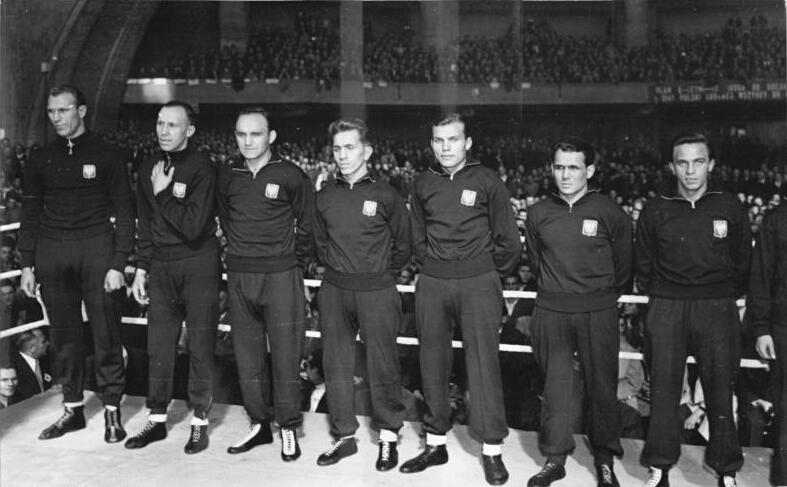

Aleksy Antkiewicz (12 November 1923 – 3 April 2005) was a Polish boxer. He won two Olympic medals for Poland: bronze in London 1948 in featherweight division (which was the only Polish medal at those Olympic Games and the first medal for Poland in boxing) and silver at the next Olympics in Helsinki 1952 in the lightweight division.

He was born in Katlewo, Warmia and died in Gdańsk.

== 1952 Olympic results ==
Aleksy Antkiewicz competed as a lightweight boxer for Poland in the 1952 Olympic boxing tournament in Helsinki, Finland. Below are his results from that tournament:

- Round of 32: defeated Benjamin Enríquez of the Philippines by decision, 3–0;
- Round of 16: defeated Hans-Werner Wohlers of West Germany by decision, 3–0;
- Quarterfinal: defeated Frederick Reardon of Great Britain by decision, 3–0;
- Semifinal: defeated Gheorghe Fiat of Romania by walkover;
- Final: lost to Aureliano Bolognesi of Italy by decision, 2–1.
