= Lennart Souchon =

German political scholar

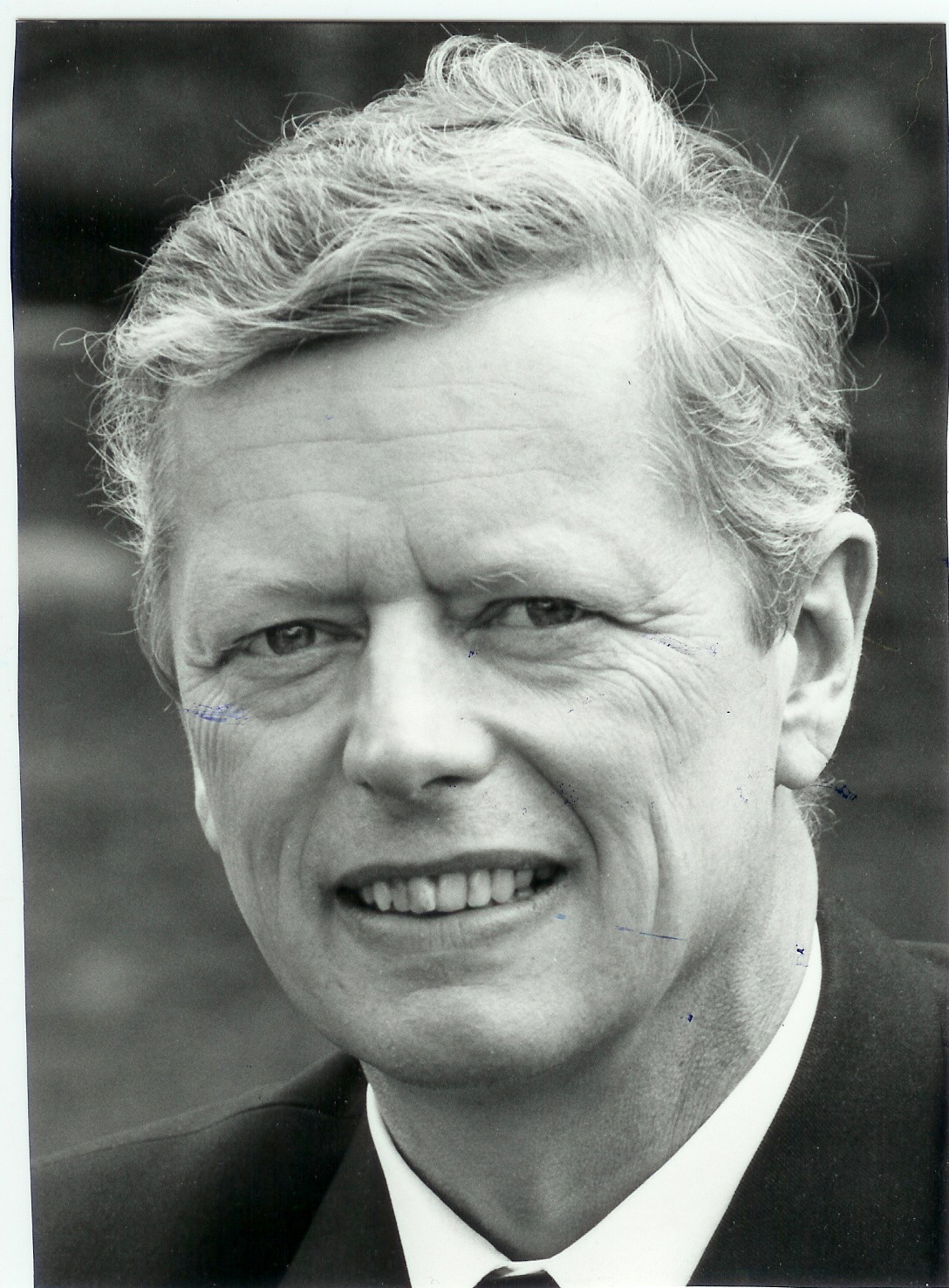
Lennart Souchon

Lennart Souchon (born May 7, 1942) is a German strategist and scholar of political philosophy and military theory. He was the director of the International Clausewitz-Center at the Military Academy of the German Armed Forces (1999–2018) and founded the Clausewitz Network for Strategic Studies in 2008. He was also a professor at the University of Potsdam (1993–2019) and lectured at the University of Halle-Wittenberg (2002–2004).

== Professional life ==
Souchon joined the German Navy in 1962 (Crew IV/62) and finished his Officer’s Training at Mürwik Naval School in 1965. He served on Fast Patrol Boats and as Combat Information Officer on the Guided Missile Destroyer Mölders. He attended the Naval Postgraduate School in Monterey, California and graduated as Doctor of Philosophy (Ph.D.) with Sydney R. Parker in 1975. His dissertation was on Structures, Analysis, and Design of N-Dimensional Recursive Digital Filters.

From 1976 to 1979, he commanded the F-104 Electronic and Weapons Squadron, Naval Air Wing 2. He attended the National General/Admiral Staff Officer Course at the Military Academy of the German Armed Forces in Hamburg in 1979. After assignments in the Naval Air Division and the concept branch of the Maritime Supreme Headquarters in Bonn, he served as Deputy Commandant of the Mürwik Naval School. In 1988, he went back to the Military Academy of the German Armed Forces. There he served as a lecturer for Security Policy, Commandant of the Senior Staff Courses (1995), and Dean of the Security Policy and Strategy Faculty (1999–2002). Between 1992 and 1995, he served as Director of Studies at the Federal Academy for Security Policy under president Dieter Wellershoff. From 1992 to 2004, Souchon was Director of the high-ranking German-Polish Officers Seminar in Cooperation with the European Academy in Waren and the National Defence University of Warsaw.

In parallel, he lectured at the University of Potsdam (1993–2019), focusing on the topic: Strategic Studies and Strategic Theory of the Prussian General Carl von Clausewitz. Besides, he held a teaching assignment from Suzanne S. Schüttemeyer from 2002 to 2004 at the Martin-Luther-University at Halle-Wittenberg. In 2003, he was appointed Professor by Wolfgang Loschelder, then Rector of the University of Potsdam.

Souchon is a member of the International Institute for Strategic Studies (IISS) in London and is a member of the advisory board of the Clausewitz Network for Strategic Studies (CNSS). Furthermore, he is a member of the Clausewitz Society (since 1981) in which he also serves as a member of the directorate and board of advisors (since 1985).

== Works ==
=== Monographs ===
- Strategy in the 21st Century. The Continuing Relevance of Carl von Clausewitz. Springer International Publishing, Basel 2020, ISBN 978-3-030-46027-3.
- Carl von Clausewitz. Strategie im 21. Jahrhundert. Mittler, Hamburg etc. 2012, ISBN 978-3-8132-0939-6.
- Die Renaissance Europas. Europäische Sicherheitspolitik. Ein internationales Modell. 2nd, revised edition. Mittler, Berlin etc. 1994, ISBN 3-8132-0442-1.
- Neue deutsche Sicherheitspolitik. Mittler, Herford etc. 1990, ISBN 3-8132-0352-2.

=== Editorship ===
- 26 Clausewitz-Informationen from 2000-2015.
- together with Hans-Adolf Jacobsen: W sluzbie pokoju. Bundeswehra 1955–1993 [Im Dienste der Friedenssicherung]. Translated by Cezary Eugeniusz Kröl, Daniel Luliriski, and Pawel Seydak. Bellona, Warsaw 1993.
- together with Charles L. Barry: Security Architecture for Europe. Based on a US-German workshop co-sponsored by the Institute for National Strategic Studies and the Federal College for Security Policy Studies. National Defense University Press, Washington, D.C. 1994.
