= Boxing at the 1952 Summer Olympics – Lightweight =

Olympic boxing tournament

Lightweight boxing at the Games of the XV Olympiad
- Venue: Messuhalli
- Dates: 28 July – 2 August 1952
- Competitors: 27 from 27 nations

Medalists
1st place, gold medalist(s)		Aureliano Bolognesi	Italy
2nd place, silver medalist(s)		Aleksy Antkiewicz	Poland
3rd place, bronze medalist(s)		Gheorghe Fiat	Romania
3rd place, bronze medalist(s)		Erkki Pakkanen	Finland

The men's lightweight event was part of the boxing programme at the 1952 Summer Olympics. The weight class allowed boxers of up to 60 kilograms to compete. The competition was held from 28 July to 2 August 1952. 27 boxers from 27 nations competed.

== Medalists ==
Gold	Aureliano Bolognesi; Italy
Silver	Aleksy Antkiewicz; Poland
Bronze	Gheorghe Fiat; Romania
Bronze	Erkki Pakkanen; Finland

== Results ==
Winner	NOC	Result	Loser	NOC
First Round (July 29)
Erkki Pakkanen	Finland	BYE
Petros Nazarbegian	Iran	BYE
Vicente Matute	Venezuela	BYE
Muhammad Ali	Pakistan	BYE
Aureliano Bolognesi	Italy	BYE
Robert Bickle	United States	TKO 2R	Basil Henricus	Ceylon
István Juhász	Hungary	3 – 0	Luis Albino	Uruguay
Clayton Kenny	Canada	TKO 3R	Niels Bertelsen	Denmark
Hans-Werner Wohlers	Germany	3 – 0	Lyubomir Markov	Bulgaria
Aleksy Antkiewicz	Poland	3 – 0	Benjamin Enríquez	Philippines
Frederick Reardon	Great Britain	KO 3R	Roger Cuche	Switzerland
Aleksandr Zasukhin	Soviet Union	2 – 1	Séraphin Ferrer	France
Leopold Potesil	Austria	3 – 0	Ju Sang-jeom	South Korea
Américo Bonetti	Argentina	3 – 0	Johnny van Rensburg	South Africa
Gheorghe Fiat	Romania	3 – 0	Mohi Din Hamaky	Egypt
Kevin Martin	Ireland	2 – 1	Marcel Van De Keere	Belgium
Second Round (July 29 & 30)
Erkki Pakkanen	Finland	3 – 0	Petros Nazarbegian	Iran
Vicente Matute	Venezuela	KO 1R	Mohammad Ali	Pakistan
Aureliano Bolognesi	Italy	2 – 1	Robert Bickle	United States
István Juhász	Hungary	2 – 1	Clayton Kenny	Canada
Aleksy Antkiewicz	Poland	3 – 0	Hans-Werner Wohlers	Germany
Frederick Reardon	Great Britain	3 – 0	Aleksandr Zasuhin	Soviet Union
Americo Bonetti	Argentina	3 – 0	Leopold Potesil	Austria
Gheorghe Fiat	Romania	3 – 0	Kevin Martin	Ireland
Third Round (July 31)
Aleksy Antkiewicz	Poland	3 – 0	Frederick Reardon	Great Britain
Erkki Pakkanen	Finland	3 – 0	Vicente Matute	Venezuela
Gheorghe Fiat	Romania	2 – 1	Americo Bonetti	Argentina
Aureliano Bolognesi	Italy	2 – 1	István Juhász	Hungary
Semi-final (August 1)
Aureliano Bolognesi	Italy	3 – 0	Erkki Pakkanen	Finland
Aleksy Antkiewicz	Poland	Walk-over	Gheorghe Fiat	Romania
Final (August 2)
Aureliano Bolognesi	Italy	2 – 1	Aleksy Antkiewicz	Poland
