= Aureliano Bolognesi =

Italian boxer (1930–2018)

Medal record

Men's boxing

Representing Italy

Olympic Games
Gold medal – first place	1952 Helsinki	Lightweight

Aureliano Bolognesi (15 November 1930 in Sestri Ponente, Italy – 30 March 2018 in Genoa) was an Italian boxer.

== Amateur career ==
Bolognesi was the Lightweight gold medalist at the 1952 Helsinki Olympics.

=== 1952 Olympic results ===
Bolognesi's results are as follows:

- Round of 32: bye
- Round of 16: Defeated Bobby Bickle (United States) by decision, 2-1
- Quarterfinal: Defeated István Juhász (Hungary) by decision, 2-1
- Semifinal: Defeated Erkki Pakkanen (Finland) by decision, 3-0
- Final: Defeated Aleksy Antkiewicz (Poland) by decision, 2-1 (won gold medal)

== Pro career ==
Bolognesi turned pro in 1954 and fought mainly in Italy, and retired in 1956 having won 17, lost 2 and drawn 2 with 2 KOs.
