= Ansgar Bethge =

- Born: 16 November 1924
- Died: 13 January 2008 (aged 83)
- Military career
- Branch: German Navy
- Commands: German Navy; Hamburg; Lütjens
- Awards: Grand Cross, Federal Order of Merit

Ansgar Bethge was Inspector of the Navy from 1980 to 1985.

== Bibliography ==
- Dermot Bradley: Die Generale und Admirale der Bundeswehr. Band 1 (Adam – Fuhr), Osnabrück 1998, ISBN 978-3-7648-2492-1.
- Busch, Rainer; Röll, Hans-Joachim (1999). German U-boat commanders of World War II : a biographical dictionary. Translated by Brooks, Geoffrey. London, Annapolis, Md: Greenhill Books, Naval Institute Press. ISBN 1-55750-186-6.

Military offices
Preceded by Vizeadmiral Günter Luther	Inspector of the Navy; April 1980 – March 1985	Succeeded by Vizeadmiral Dieter Wellershoff
Preceded by Konteradmiral Horst von Schroeter	Deputy Inspector of the Navy; October 1976 – Marchr 1980	Succeeded by Konteradmiral Hanshermann Vohs
