= Hans Lüssow =

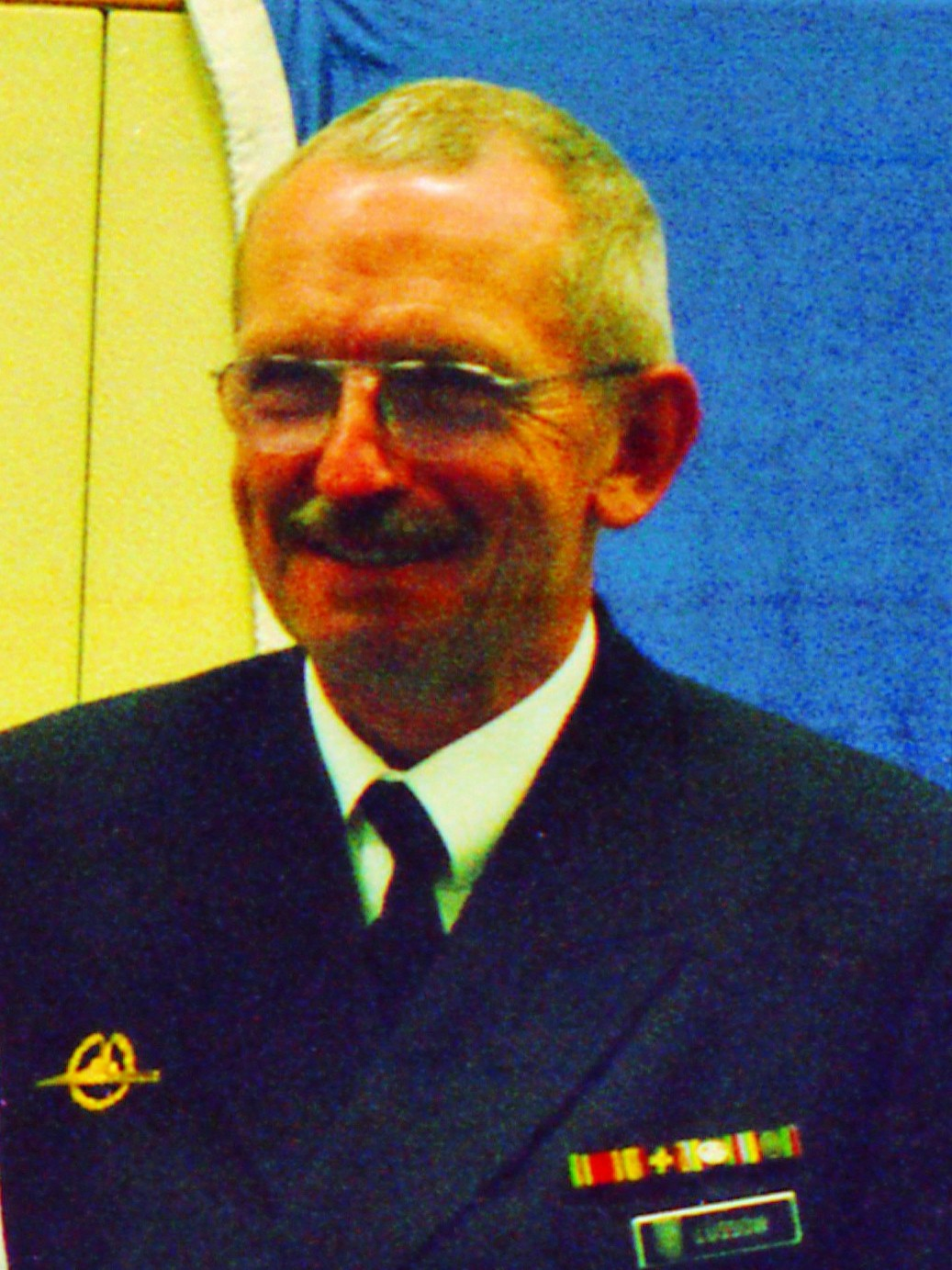
Hans Lüssow

Hans Lüssow (born 10 February 1942 in Greifswald) is a retired German Vizeadmiral and former Inspector of the Navy from 1998 until 2003.

Military offices
Preceded by Vizeadmiral Hans-Rudolf Boehmer	Inspector of the Navy; October 1998 – February 2003	Succeeded by Vizeadmiral Lutz Feldt
Preceded by Konteradmiral Jürgen Geier	Chief of the Navy Office; 1997 – 1998	Succeeded by Konteradmiral Frank Ropers
