= Ju Sang-jeom =

South Korean boxer

Personal information
- Nationality: South Korean
- Born: 15 September 1926
- Died: 1981 (aged 54–55); New York

Sport
- Sport: Boxing

Ju Sang-jeom (Korean: 주상점, 15 September 1926 – 1981) was a South Korean boxer. He competed in the men's lightweight event at the 1952 Summer Olympics.
