= Klaus Naumann =

German general

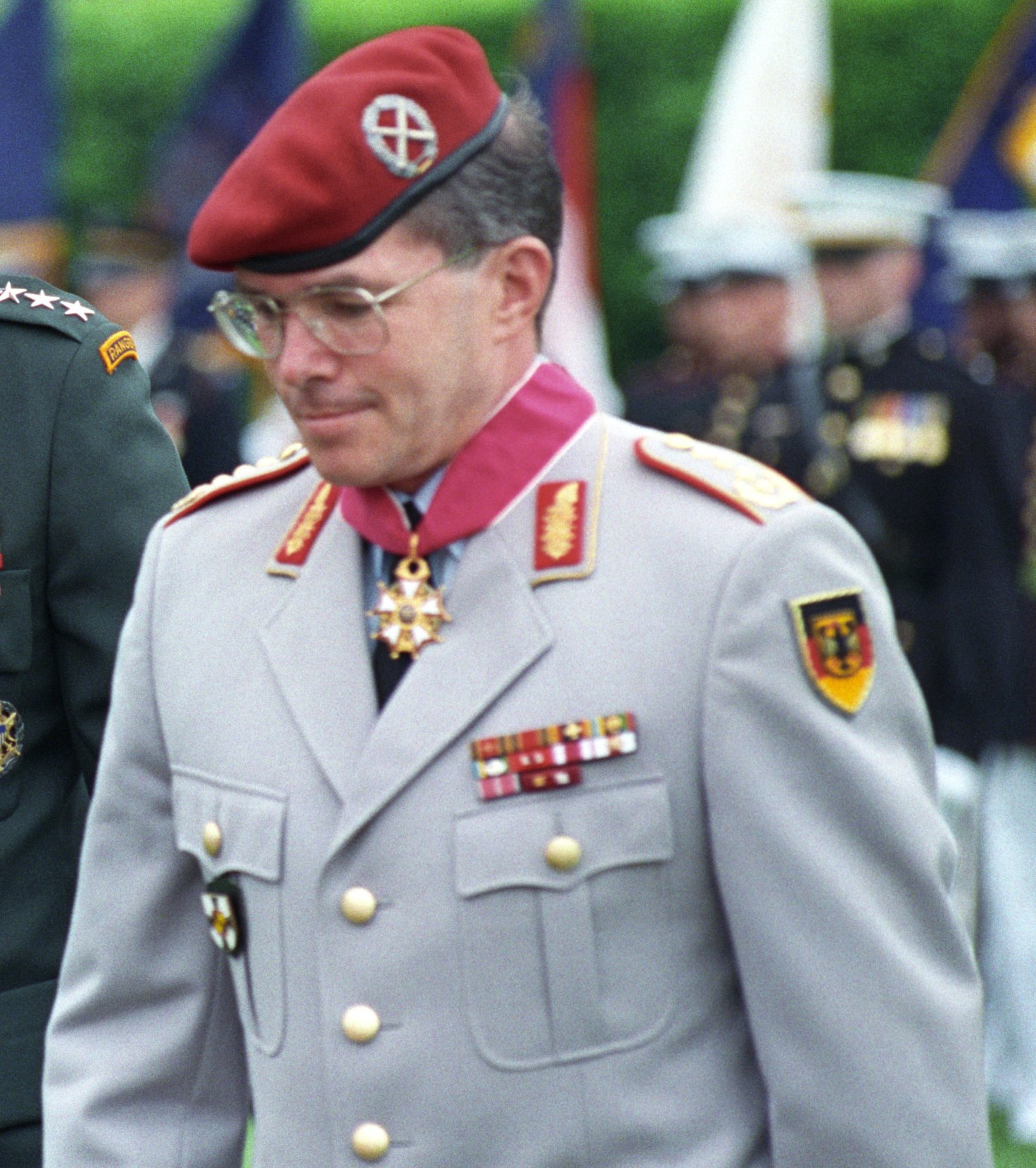
- Naumann in 1993
- Born: 25 May 1939 (age 87); Munich, Nazi Germany
- Military career
- Allegiance: Germany
- Service years: 1958–1999
- Rank: General

Klaus Naumann (born 25 May 1939) is a retired German General, who served as Chief of Staff of the Bundeswehr, the German armed forces, from 1991 to 1996, and as Chairman of the NATO Military Committee from 1996 to 1999, succeeding the British general Richard Frederick Vincent, Baron Vincent of Coleshill. He testified against Slobodan Milošević in the International Criminal Tribunal for the former Yugoslavia. He attended as a course member the Royal College of Defence Studies in London.

== Awards and decorations ==
Naumann is considered the most decorated German soldier since World War II. His medals and decorations include:

- Great Cross of Merit of the Federal Republic of Germany
- Badge of Honour of the Bundeswehr in Gold
- Manfred Wörner Medal
- Grand Officer of the Legion of Honour (France)
- Grand Cross of Military Merit in white (Spain)
- Honorary Knight Commander of the Order of the British Empire
- Grand Officer of the Order of the Crown (Belgium)
- Commander of the Legion of Merit (United States)
- Commander's Cross with Star of the Royal Norwegian Order of Merit
- Defense Medal First Class (Hungary)
- Grand Officer of the Order of Leopold (Belgium)
- Grand Officer of the Order of Orange-Nassau (Netherlands)
- Commander with Star of the Order of the Lion of Finland

Military offices
Preceded by Field Marshal Sir Richard Vincent	Chairman of the NATO Military Committee; 14 February 1996 – 6 May 1999	Succeeded by Admiral Guido Venturoni
Preceded by Admiral Dieter Wellershoff	Chief of Staff of the Federal Armed Forces; 1 October 1991 – 8 February 1996	Succeeded by General Hartmut Bagger
