= Basil Henricus =

Sri Lankan boxer

Personal information
- Nationality: Sri Lankan
- Born: 30 October 1922 Colombo, Ceylon
- Died: 4 August 2002 (aged 79) Melbourne, Australia

Sport
- Sport: Boxing

Basil Henricus
- Military career
- Allegiance: Sri Lanka
- Branch: Ceylon Defence Force; Ceylon Army
- Service years: 1943–1946; 1949–1967
- Rank: Major
- Unit: Ceylon Corps of Military Police
- Commands: Ceylon Corps of Military Police
- Conflicts: World War II
- Awards: War Medal 1939–1945

Major Basil Cholmondel Henricus (30 October 1922 – 4 August 2002) was a Sri Lankan boxer. He competed in the men's lightweight event at the 1952 Summer Olympics. At the 1952 Summer Olympics, he lost to Robert Bickle of the United States.

== Boxing career ==
He was educated at Royal College, Colombo. At aged thirteen he took part in the Stubbs Shield Boxing Meet and won his weight. He was named the Best Boxer and won the Jayewardene Cup. In 1940, he participated in the Amateur Boxing Championships and won the Walsmly Trophy. In 1941, he captained the Royal College Boxing Team and won the Stubbs Shield for the College. In 1942, he won the featherweight class at the National Boxing Championships. He retained the National Boxing Championship till 1946, having defeated Eddie Gray and retired due to an injury from a motorcycle accident. He failed to qualify for the Empire Games in 1950, but was able to qualify for the 1952 Summer Olympics.

== Military career ==
Following his schooling and the on-set of World War II, he served as a sports instructor from 1941 to 1942 in the Essential Services Corps and the Ceylon Royal Naval Volunteer Reserve. In 1943, he was commissioned a Second Lieutenant in the Ceylon Defence Force. He completed in the Defence Services track and field events held in 1944, where he defeated Duncan White in the 100 yards and came second to White in the 220 yards. He was second in the long jump. After the formation of the Ceylon Army, Henricus transferred to the regular force and was attached to the Ceylon Corps of Military Police and went on to serve as its commanding officer from September 1964 to October 1969 with the rank of Major. His medals include the Ceylon Armed Services Inauguration Medal, Defence Medal, the War Medal 1939–1945 and the Queen Elizabeth II Coronation Medal.

His brothers were Chief Inspector Barney Henricus, Captain George Henricus of the Ceylon Army, Alan Henricus, a former Lieutenant in the Royal Ceylon Navy and Derrick Henricus.
