= Marcel Van De Keere =

Belgian boxer

Personal information
- Nationality: Belgian
- Born: 27 April 1931; Ghent, Belgium
- Died: 1994 (aged 62–63)

Sport
- Sport: Boxing

Marcel Van De Keere (27 April 1931 – 1994) was a Belgian boxer. He competed in the men's lightweight event at the 1952 Summer Olympics.
