= Diane Hébert =

Diane Hébert (April 26, 1957 – June 29, 2008) was the first Quebecer to receive a heart-lung transplant (on November 26, 1985), needed after doctors discovered a pulmonary embolism. After her operation, she became an organ transplant advocate and founded a foundation to assist organ transplant recipients.

At first, she was due to go to California, because at that time the Canadian hospitals were not able to perform such a complicated operation. Her story made the headlines and people gave money generously to help her afford the trip. However, after waiting for two years for a suitable donor, it developed that the surgery could be done at the Toronto General Hospital, and a donor was found soon thereafter.

There were many complications after the operations: a month-long coma, three heart attacks, and she needed four more operations. Upon waking up, she had almost no sight and no hearing, no speech, and no leg movement.

Hébert died on June 29, 2008, from lung infection complications.

Philip Stratford won the Governor General's Award for French to English translation at the 1988 Governor General's Awards for Second Chance, his translation of Hébert's medical memoir Un Second souffle.

== Bibliography ==
- Un Second Souffle (1986) Montreal: Éditions de l'Homme, 332p., ISBN 2-7619-0629-2
