= Hans-Joachim Mann =

Former German Vizeadmiral

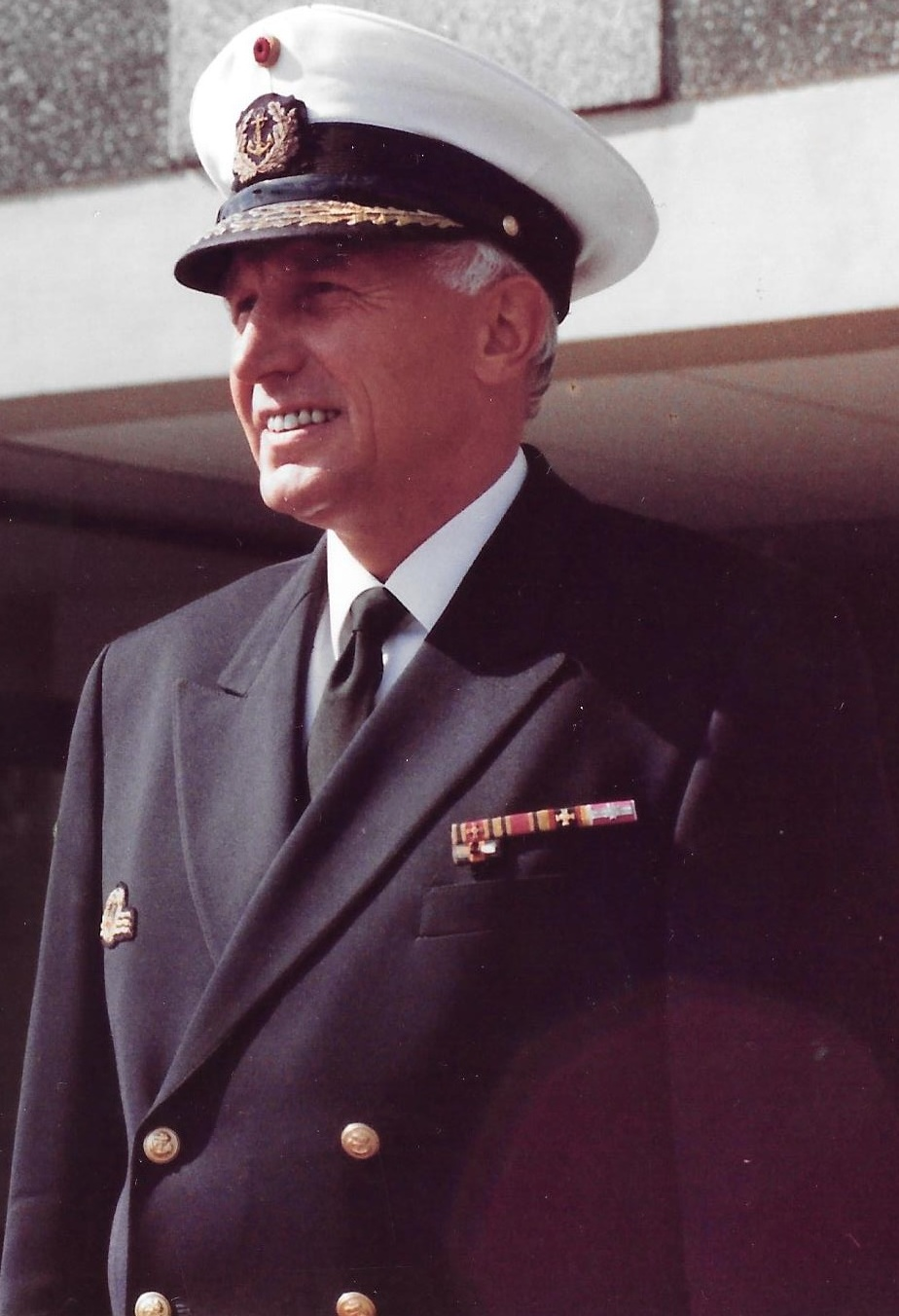
Hans-Joachim Mann, 1990

Hans-Joachim Mann (born 26 June 1935) is a retired German Vizeadmiral and former Inspector of the Navy from 1986 until 1991.

Military offices
Preceded by Vizeadmiral Dieter Wellershoff	Inspector of the Navy; October 1986–September 1991	Succeeded by Vizeadmiral Hein-Peter Weyher
