= Petros Nazarbegian =

Iranian boxer

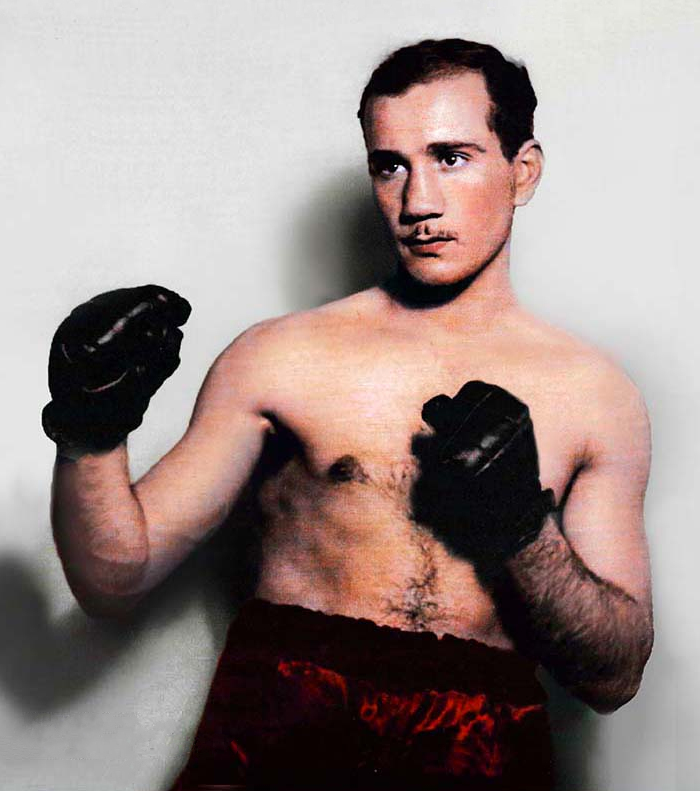

Personal information
- Born: May 6, 1927 Tehran, Iran
- Died: November 13, 2015 (aged 88) California, U.S.

Sport
- Sport: Boxing

Petros Nazarbegian (Armenian: Պետրոս Նազարբեգեան; Persian: پطروس نظربگیان May 6, 1927 – November 13, 2015) was an Iranian amateur boxer of Armenian ethnicity who competed in the lightweight division at the 1952 Summer Olympics as a member of the Iran senior national Boxing team. He lost to Erkki Pakkanen, the eventual bronze medal winner, in the second round on points. Nazarbegian was also the head coach of Iranian national boxing team, from 1954 up to 1963, an international referee, and vice president of the International Boxing Association. In Tokyo 1958, Petros Nazarbegian acted as head coach for the Iranian boxers at the 1958 Asian Games who were participating officially for the first time in the Third Asian Games, with a team of nine boxers, managing to rank second, considering medal counts, and fifth in the overall boxing table.
