= Luis Albino =

Uruguayan boxer (1929–2006)

Personal information
- Nationality: Uruguayan
- Born: 15 October 1929
- Died: 27 October 2006 (aged 77)

Sport
- Sport: Boxing

Luis Albino (15 October 1929 – 27 October 2006) was a Uruguayan boxer. He competed in the men's lightweight event at the 1952 Summer Olympics.
