= Lyubomir Markov =

Bulgarian boxer

Personal information
- Nationality: Bulgarian
- Born: 14 August 1927

Sport
- Sport: Boxing

Lyubomir Markov (born 14 August 1927) was a Bulgarian former boxer. He competed in the men's lightweight event at the 1952 Summer Olympics.
