= Heinz Kühnle =

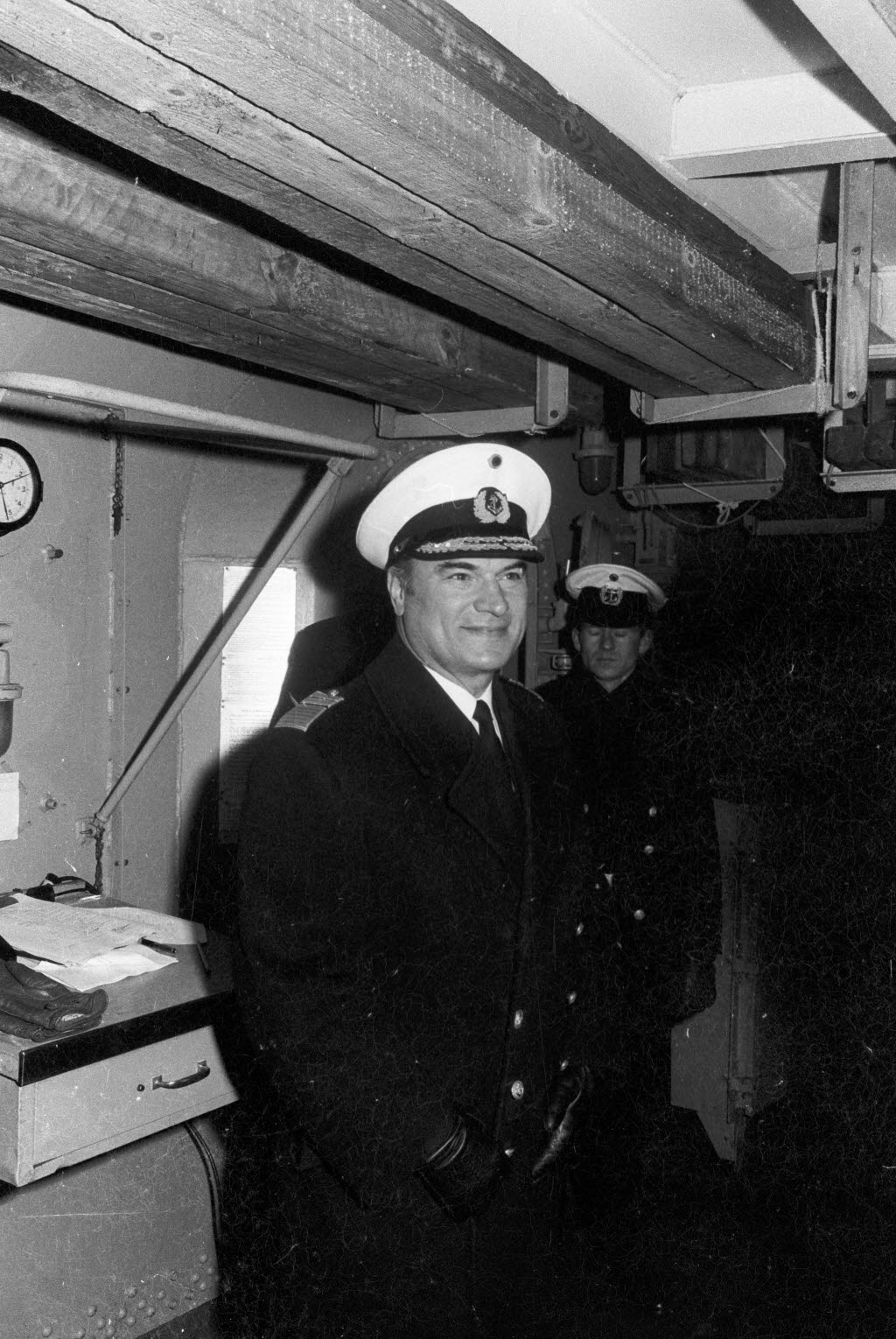
- Born: 16 January 1915
- Died: 12 October 2001 (aged 86)
- Rank: Vizeadmiral

Heinrich Georg (Heinz) Kühnle (16 January 1915 – 12 October 2001) was a German Vizeadmiral and Inspector of the Navy from 1971 until 1975.

Military offices
Preceded by Vizeadmiral Gert Jeschonnek	Inspector of the Navy; October 1971–March 1975	Succeeded by Vizeadmiral Günter Luther
Preceded by Konteradmiral Erich Topp	Deputy Inspector of the Navy; Oktober 1969 – September 1971	Succeeded by Konteradmiral Horst von Schroeter
