= Lutz Feldt =

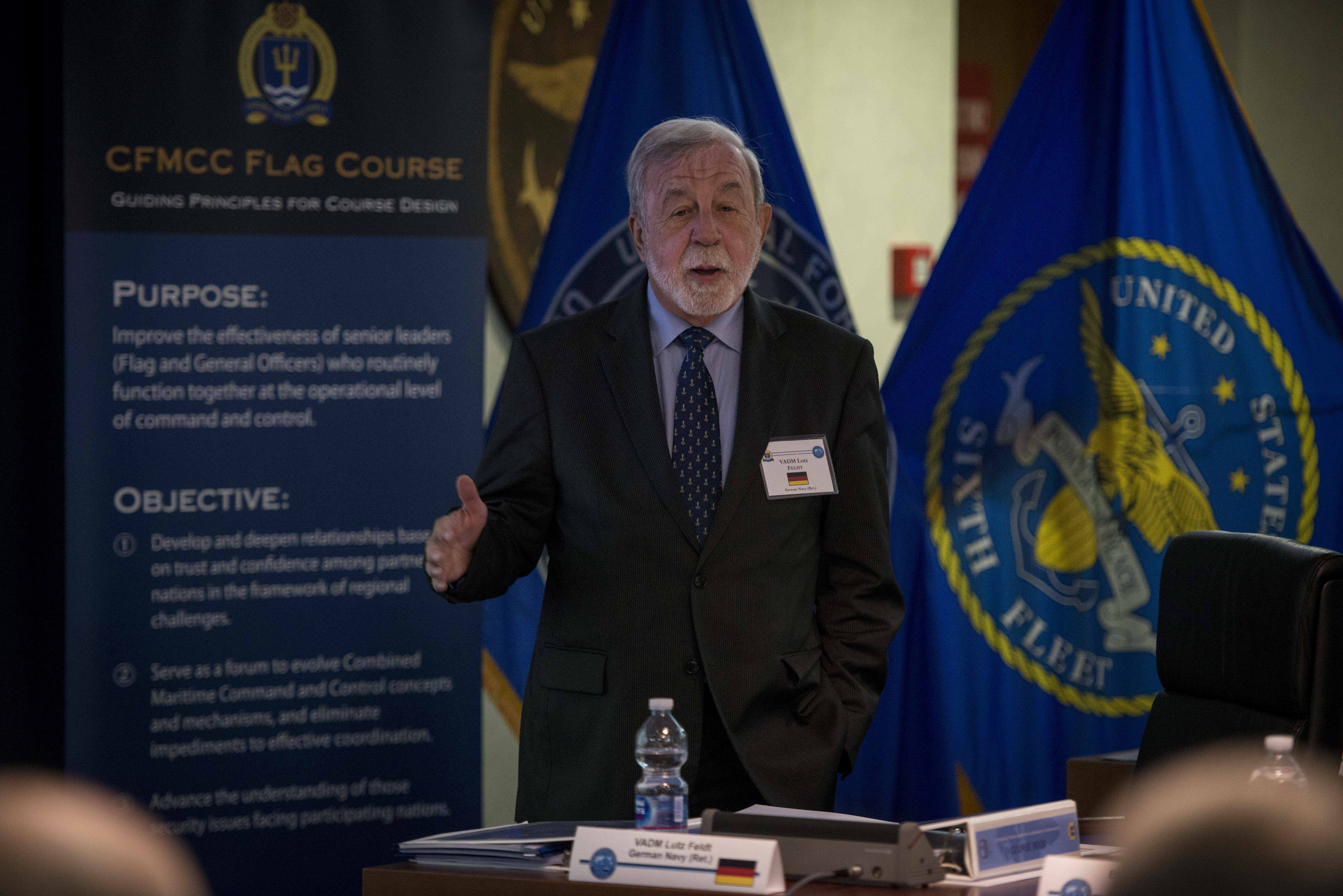
- Born: 25 April 1945 (age 81)
- Military career
- Commands: German Navy

Lutz Feldt was Inspector of the Navy from 2003 to 2006.

Military offices
Preceded by Vizeadmiral Hans Lüssow	Inspector of the Navy; März 2003–April 2006	Succeeded by Vizeadmiral Wolfgang E. Nolting
