= Hein-Peter Weyher =

- Born: 22 March 1935 (age 91)
- Military career
- Allegiance: West Germany
- Branch: German Navy
- Rank: Vizeadmiral

Hein-Peter Weyher (born 22 March 1935) is a retired German Vizeadmiral and former Inspector of the Navy from 1991 until 1995.

Military offices
Preceded by Vizeadmiral Hans-Joachim Mann	Inspector of the Navy; 1 October 1991 – April 1995	Succeeded by Vizeadmiral Hans-Rudolf Boehmer
Preceded by Konteradmiral Dieter Wellershoff	Deputy Inspector of the Navy; April 1985 – March 1988	Succeeded by Konteradmiral Dieter Franz Braun
Preceded by Konteradmiral Dieter Franz Braun	Chief of the Navy Office; 1 April 1988 – 30 September 1991	Succeeded by Konteradmiral Jürgen Geier
