= Hans-Rudolf Boehmer =

German military personnel

- Born: 18 May 1938 (age 88)
- Military career
- Commands: German Navy

Hans-Rudolf Boehmer was Inspector of the Navy from 1995 to 1998.

Military offices
Preceded by Vizeadmiral Hein-Peter Weyher	Inspector of the Navy; Oktober 1991–April 1995	Succeeded by Vizeadmiral Hans Lüssow
Preceded by Konteradmiral Dieter Franz Braun	Deputy Inspector of the Navy; May 1990 – March 1993	Succeeded by Konteradmiral Dirk Horten
