= Inspector of the Navy =

Commander of the German Navy

Inspector of the German Navy
- Inspekteur der Marine
- Standard of the Inspector of the Navy
- Incumbent; Vizeadmiral Wilhelm Tobias Abry since 1 October 2026
- Federal Minister of Defence
- Abbreviation: InspM
- Reports to: General Inspector of the Bundeswehr
- Precursor: Oberkommando der Marine

The Inspector of the Navy (German: Inspekteur der Marine) is the commander of the Navy of the modern-day German Armed Forces, the Bundeswehr. Since the various bodies responsible for the high command of the German Navy were merged in 2012, the Inspector has been based at the Navy Command at Rostock. Before then, the Inspector was head of the Naval Staff of the Ministry of Defence, based in Bonn. Both the Inspector and his deputy hold the rank of vice admiral (German: Vizeadmiral).

The Inspector is responsible for the readiness of personnel and materiel in the German Navy, in that regard he reports directly to the Federal Minister of Defence. The Inspector commands the Navy Command; however, the subordinate departments of the Navy are led by their heads at Navy Command and do not report directly to the Inspector. The Inspector sits under the General Inspector of the Bundeswehr and is a member of the Defence Council for Bundeswehr-wide matters.

== List of Inspectors of the Navy ==
No.	Portrait	Inspector of the Navy	Took office	Left office	Time in office	Ref.
1	Friedrich Ruge	Vizeadmiral; Friedrich Ruge (1894–1985)	June 1956	August 1961	5 years, 2 months	-
2	Karl-Adolf Zenker	Vizeadmiral; Karl-Adolf Zenker (1907–1998)	August 1961	30 September 1967	6 years, 1 month	-
3	Gert Jeschonnek	Vizeadmiral; Gert Jeschonnek (1912–1999)	1 October 1967	30 September 1971	3 years, 11 months	-
4	Heinz Kühnle	Vizeadmiral; Heinz Kühnle (1915–2001)	1 October 1971	31 March 1975	3 years, 5 months	-
5	Günter Luther	Vizeadmiral; Günter Luther (1922–1997)	1 April 1975	31 March 1980	4 years, 11 months	-
6	Ansgar Bethge	Vizeadmiral; Ansgar Bethge (1924–2008)	1 April 1980	31 March 1985	4 years, 11 months	-
7	Dieter Wellershoff	Vizeadmiral; Dieter Wellershoff (1933–2005)	1 April 1985	September 1986	1 year, 5 months	-
8	Hans-Joachim Mann	Vizeadmiral; Hans-Joachim Mann (born 1935)	1 October 1986	30 September 1991	4 years, 11 months	-
9	Hein-Peter Weyher	Vizeadmiral; Hein-Peter Weyher (born 1935)	1 October 1991	April 1995	3 years, 6 months	-
10	Hans-Rudolf Boehmer	Vizeadmiral; Hans-Rudolf Boehmer (born 1938)	April 1995	September 1998	3 years, 5 months	-
11	Hans Lüssow	Vizeadmiral; Hans Lüssow (born 1942)	1 October 1998	February 2003	4 years, 4 months	-
12	Lutz Feldt	Vizeadmiral; Lutz Feldt (born 1942)	1 March 2003	April 2006	3 years, 1 month	-
13	Wolfgang E. Nolting	Vizeadmiral; Wolfgang E. Nolting (born 1948)	April 2006	28 April 2010	4 years	-
14	Axel Schimpf	Vizeadmiral; Axel Schimpf (born 1952)	28 April 2010	28 October 2014	4 years, 6 months	-
15	Andreas Krause	Vizeadmiral; Andreas Krause (born 1956)	28 October 2014	24 March 2021	6 years, 4 months	-
16	Kay-Achim Schönbach	Vizeadmiral; Kay-Achim Schönbach (born 1965)	24 March 2021	22 January 2022	9 months	-
17	Jan Christian Kaack	Vizeadmiral; Jan Christian Kaack (born 1962)	22 January 2022	1 October 2026	4 years, 8 months	-
18	Wilhelm Tobias Abry	Vizeadmiral; Wilhelm Tobias Abry (born 1968)	1 October 2026	Incumbent	0 months	-

== See also ==
- Inspector of the Army
- Oberkommando der Marine
- Marineamt
- First Sea Lord
- List of admirals of the German Navy
