= Robert Bickle =

American boxer

Personal information
- Nationality: American
- Born: March 27, 1929 Hoisington, Kansas, United States
- Died: May 28, 1974 (aged 45) Kansas City, Missouri, United States

Sport
- Sport: Boxing

Robert Bickle (March 27, 1929 – May 28, 1974) was an American boxer. He competed in the men's lightweight event at the 1952 Summer Olympics. At the 1952 Summer Olympics, he defeated Basil Henricus of Ceylon, before losing to Aureliano Bolognesi of Italy.
