= Günter Luther =

German admiral (1922–1997)

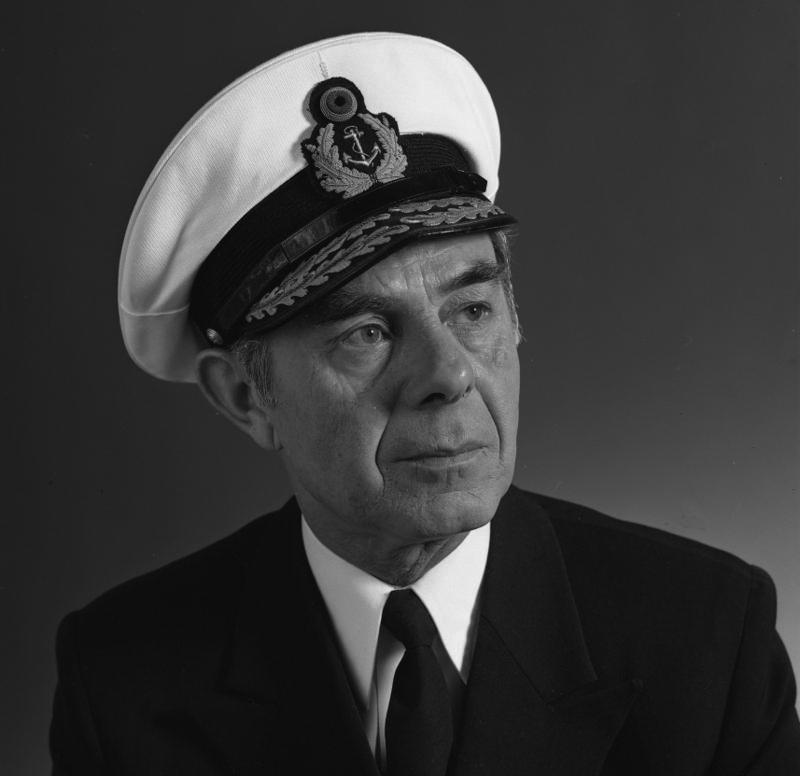
- Günter Luther, 1976
- Born: 17 March 1922; Bestwig, Germany
- Died: 31 May 1997 (aged 75); Kiel, Germany
- Military career
- Allegiance: Nazi Germany (to 1945) Federal Republic of Germany
- Branch: Kriegsmarine; Luftwaffe; German Navy
- Service years: 1939–45; 1956–82
- Rank: Oberleutnant (Luftwaffe); Admiral (Bundesmarine)
- Conflicts: World War II
- Awards: Iron Cross 2nd Class and 1st Class Front Flying Clasp of the Luftwaffe in Gold; Grand Cross of Merit with Star and Sash Grand Cross of the Order of Naval Merit (Spain)

Günter Luther (17 March 1922 – 31 May 1997) was a German admiral who became Inspector of the Navy and Deputy Supreme Allied Commander Europe for NATO. During World War II, he served as a military pilot in the Kriegsmarine and a paratrooper in the Luftwaffe. After the war, he joined the newly founded West German Bundesmarine in 1956.

== Personal life ==
Günter Luther was born in Bestwig on 17 March 1922, the son of a teacher who came from a family of artisans. He completed his secondary education and took his Abitur in 1939. In 1947 he married his wife Christel, who died in 1995. He died on 31 May 1997 in Kiel from a heart condition, whilst returning from a reunion at the wheel of his car.

== Career ==
=== World War II ===
After taking his Abitur, Luther joined the Kriegsmarine as an officer candidate in December 1939. He completed his nautical training on the training ship Gorch Fock and the battleship Schleswig-Holstein, and his military schooling at Naval Academy Mürwik and the naval artillery school in Kiel. His training also included half a year on the frontline on the minesweeper M-1 in Norwegian waters. He planned to train as a naval aviator.

Luther volunteered to be a forward observer. To complete this training he had to exchange his Kriegsmarine uniform for that of the Luftwaffe. Luther was commissioned as a lieutenant (Leutnant) on 1 April 1942. He served as a pilot in the Coastal Aviation Squadrons 1/906 and 1/706. He flew 160 missions over the North Sea and Arctic Ocean. In May 1944, he was shot down with his aircraft over the sea.

By then a first lieutenant (Oberleutnant), he volunteered to join the Luftwaffe's parachute troops, the Fallschirmjäger. As company commander in the 9th Fallschirmjäger Regiment (part of the 3rd Parachute Division), he fought in the Ardennes Offensive, in the Ruhr Pocket, and at the battle of Hürtgenwald. Luther became an American prisoner on 28 April 1945, and was freed in December 1945.

=== After the war ===
Luther earned his living in the aftermath of the war as a construction worker. This was followed by studying English at a university, which enabled him to take jobs as an interpreter and personnel manager for the American armed forces. From 1952 to 1956, he worked for the Agfa camera company, as a clerk and export group leader.

=== Bundeswehr ===
On 1 March 1956 Luther joined the newly founded Navy of West Germany's new military, the Bundeswehr, as a Kapitänleutnant (captain lieutenant). Initially, he considered serving in the German Air Force instead. He trained as a jet pilot for the Hawker Sea Hawk in the United Kingdom, and in September 1958 assumed command of the 1st Multipurpose Squadron of Naval Air Group 1. In 1960, he joined the higher command of the Navy with responsibility for the operational planning for naval aviation. In 1962 he was promoted to Korvettenkapitän (lieutenant commander) and made commander of the Navy's Flying Group 1. He continued to lead the squadron until 1968, receiving promotions to Fregattenkapitän (commander) and Kapitän zur See (captain).

He then served as the head of the department for naval aviation at the Ministry of Defence. Luther successfully lobbied for the Navy to switch directly from the Starfighter to the Tornado, without the intermediate introduction of the Phantom that occurred in the air force. He himself trained as a Starfighter pilot and flew this type of aircraft regularly.

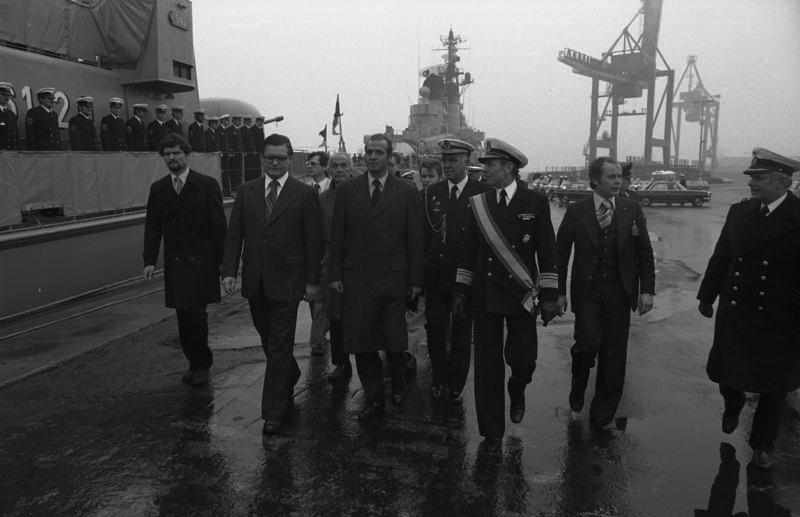
Vice Admiral Luther, accompanying Spanish king Juan Carlos during the king's 1977 visit to German naval units at Bremerhaven

With his promotion to Flottillenadmiral (flotilla admiral) on 1 October 1970 he became the youngest admiral of the German Navy at 48 years old, and was given the command of the Flotilla of Naval Aviation in Kiel-Holtenau. There he had command of around 7,500 men and over 200 aircraft. On 1 April 1972 he became commander of the German Navy in the North Sea and simultaneously NATO commander in the North Sea and Skagerrak.

In October 1972 he was promoted to Konteradmiral (rear admiral) and took up the position of chief of the Marineamt in Wilhelmshaven. On 1 April 1975 he was promoted to Vizeadmiral (vice admiral) and made Inspector of the Navy, i.e. the commander-in-chief of the German Navy.

On 1 April 1980, Luther was promoted to the rank of Admiral, and took up the NATO post of Deputy Supreme Allied Commander Europe (DSACEUR) at the Supreme Headquarters Allied Powers Europe. On 31 March 1982, Admiral Günter Luther retired from service and moved to Kiel.

Military offices
Preceded by Vizeadmiral Heinz Kühnle	Inspector of the Navy; 1 April 1975 – 30 March 1980	Succeeded by Vizeadmiral Ansgar Bethge
Preceded by Konteradmiral Günter Kuhnke	Chief of the Navy Office; 1 October 1972 – 31 March 1975	Succeeded by Konteradmiral Otto Ites
