= Friedrich Ruge =

WW2 German Navy admiral (1894-1985)

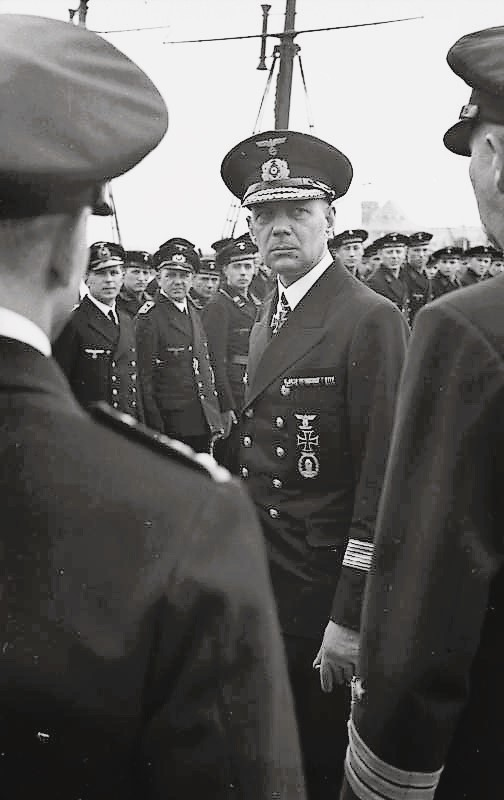
- Friedrich Ruge visiting a Minensuchflottille
- Born: 24 December 1894; Leipzig, Kingdom of Saxony, German Empire
- Died: 3 July 1985 (aged 90); Tübingen, Baden-Württemberg, West Germany
- Relatives: Peter von Zahn
- Military career
- Allegiance: German Empire; Weimar Republic; Nazi Germany; West Germany
- Branch: Imperial German Navy; Reichsmarine; Kriegsmarine; German Navy
- Service years: 1914–45, 1955–61
- Rank: Vizeadmiral
- Conflicts: World War I World War II
- Awards: Knight's Cross of the Iron Cross; Great Cross of Merit

Friedrich Oskar Ruge (24 December 1894 – 3 July 1985) was an officer in the German Navy and recipient of the Knight's Cross of the Iron Cross of Nazi Germany. He served as the first commander (Inspector of the Navy) of the post-war German Navy in West Germany from 1955 until his retirement in 1961, concluding 37 years of active service in four different German navies.

In retirement, Ruge joined the faculty at the University of Tübingen and became a prolific guest lecturer, an advisor to NATO, and briefly an actor, when he portrayed himself in the 1962 film The Longest Day. Ruge was a contributor to the "clean Wehrmacht" myth, an effort to rehabilitate the Nazi-era German armed forces by seeking to focus blame on the Nazi Party and the Waffen-SS.

Ruge altogether lived 24 years in retirement until his death in 1985 at the age of 90, and was buried in Waldfriedhof Syke in Lower Saxony.

== Early life and military career ==
Friedrich Ruge was the son and grandson of German educators. Joining the Imperial German Navy as a cadet in March 1914, he was soon a participant in the 1914, 1915, and 1916 Baltic Sea operations. In 1917 and 1918, he sailed with the destroyer raids in the North Sea and English Channel.

After the armistice, Ruge was an officer aboard the destroyer SMS B112, interned at Scapa Flow and in June 1919, he played a role in the scuttling of the German Fleet.

Returning to Germany to continue his naval career in the service of the new Weimar Republic, for the next two decades he concentrated on mines and mine warfare. From 1921 to 1923, he commanded a minesweeper.

After studies at the Technische Hochschule in Charlottenburg (now Technische Universität Berlin) from 1924 and 1926, Ruge was appointed to the minesweeper M136. From 1928 to 1932, he had staff roles associated with mine and torpedo warfare, and in September 1932 became commanding officer of the 1st Half-Flotilla of minesweepers. Ruge returned to staff duties in 1934. In the UK during the 1930s he met a British ex-sailor at a regatta, Lt Aubrey Grey, whose ship, HMS Partridge, was sunk in 1917 by the SMS V100, the ship that Ruge had been serving on. The V100 was the ship that rescued Grey from the water after the sinking and the pair became friends after meeting, their friendship only interrupted by World War II. On 1 June 1937, Ruge was appointed Führer der Minensuchboote (FdM), (Commander of Minesweepers).

== World War II ==
In August 1939, on the eve of the outbreak of World War II, Ruge's command was split into two parts, FdM West covering the North Sea and FdM Ost operating in the Baltic Sea. Ruge took command of FdM Ost, which provided minesweeping and escort support to the German Invasion of Poland in September–October 1939. On 17 October 1939, with naval operations against Poland complete, Ruge transferred to command of FDM West. He was a part of the North Sea-English Channel operations during 1940. From 1940 to 1943, he was stationed in France, rising through the upper ranks to become vizeadmiral in 1943. Sent to Italy in 1943, he served as senior German naval officer until mid-summer. He was appointed as naval advisor to Field Marshal Erwin Rommel in November 1943 to supervise the defense of northern France from the predicted Allied invasion. He had no faith in land mines and artillery shells struck underwater, but the marine mines he wanted were not available. In August 1944, he became the Kriegsmarine's Director of Ship Construction, a position in which he served till the end of World War II.

== Post-war ==
At the end of World War II, Ruge became a POW. In 1946, he started a new life as a translator, writer and educator in Cuxhaven. He was one of four Flag Officers who made up the Naval Historical Team at Bremerhaven, sponsored by the United States Navy. He entered politics as a political independent to the Cuxhaven Town Council.

In 1950, Ruge was part of a select group of former Wehrmacht high-ranking officers invited by Chancellor Konrad Adenauer to take part in the conference to discuss West Germany's rearmament. The conference resulted in the Himmerod memorandum that contributed to the creation of the myth of the "clean Wehrmacht".

During the early 1950s, he advised as to how the navy could be restructured in the new Bundesmarine, as detailed in Searle's Wehrmacht Generals. Called out of retirement when Germany became a part of NATO, Ruge was appointed Inspector of the Navy (a position similar to the U.S. Chief of Naval Operations), a post he occupied until 1961.

Afterward, he became a member of the faculty at the University of Tübingen, eventually becoming an associate professor on 21 July 1967 there. He was a guest lecturer at many universities, including the U.S. Naval War College at Newport.

Admiral Ruge was one of the umpires for the 1974 Sandhurst wargame on Operation Sea Lion.

He died in 1985.

== Literary works ==
Ruge was the author of several books, including The Soviets as Naval Opponents, 1941-1945, written for Annapolis Naval Institute in 1979, and Rommel in Normandy, written in 1959.

Quoted at Normandy: Utilization of the Anglo-American air forces is the modern type of warfare, turning the flank not from the side but from above.

In the movie The Longest Day (1962), he played himself, and was a consultant to the film.

== Decorations ==
- Iron Cross (1914)
  - 2nd Class (26 August 1917)
  - 1st Class (2 March 1918)
- Honour Cross of the World War 1914/1918
- Wehrmacht Long Service Award 2nd to 4th class (2 October 1936)
- German Olympic Games Decoration 2nd class (21 December 1936)
- Sudetenland Medal
- Clasp to the Iron Cross
  - 2nd Class (17 September 1939)
  - 1st Class (2 October 1939)
- Knight's Cross of the Iron Cross on 21 October 1940 as Kapitän zur See and commodore leader of the Minensuchboote West
- Minesweeper War Badge (15 February 1940)
- Order of Merit of the Italian Republic
- Legion of Merit, Commanders Cross (1961)
- Grand Cross of the Order of Merit of the Federal Republic of Germany (28 September 1961)

== Other honours ==
- In November 1973, the Royal Swedish Society of Naval Sciences elected him an Honorary Member.

Military offices
New title	Inspector of the Navy; June 1957–August 1961	Succeeded by Vizeadmiral Karl-Adolf Zenker
Other offices
Preceded by Lothar Ganser	President of the Reservist Association of Deutsche Bundeswehr; 1962–1965	Succeeded by Konrad Stephanus
