= Karl-Adolf Zenker =

German admiral

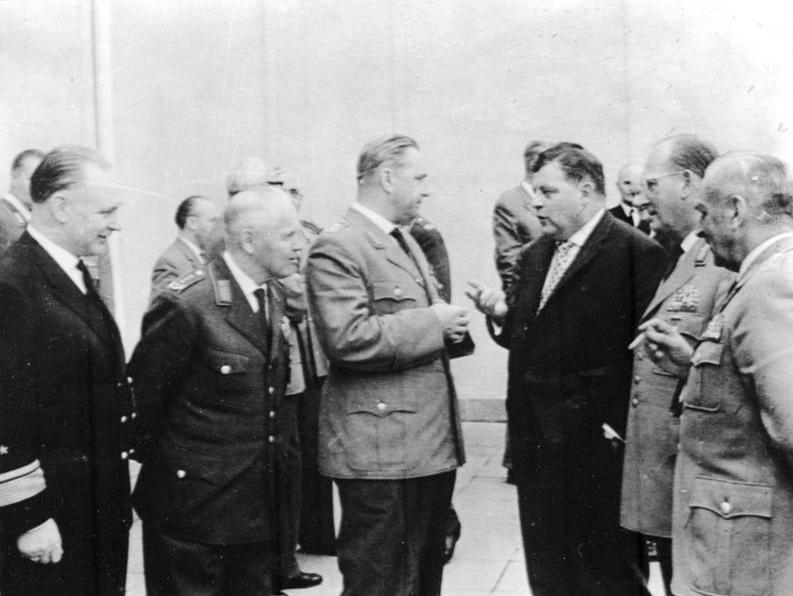
- from left to right: Konteradmiral Zenker, General Kammhuber, General Schnez, Federal Minister of Defence Strauß, General Speidel and General Foertsch.
- Born: 19 July 1907
- Died: 27 March 1998 (aged 90)
- Relatives: Hans Zenker (father)
- Military career
- Allegiance: Nazi Germany; West Germany
- Branch: Kriegsmarine; German Navy
- Rank: Vizeadmiral
- Commands: destroyer Hans Lody destroyer Z28
- Conflicts: World War II

Karl-Adolf Zenker (19 July 1907 – 27 March 1998) was an officer in the Kriegsmarine during World War II. He served as a member of the Naval Historical Team and later became commander (Inspector of the Navy) of the post-war German Navy.

His father, Hans Zenker, was Head of the Naval Command (Chef der Marineleitung) in the Navy of the Weimar Republic from 1924 to 1928.

Military offices
Preceded by Vizeadmiral Friedrich Ruge	Inspector of the Navy; August 1961–September 1967	Succeeded by Vizeadmiral Gert Jeschonnek
