= Wolfgang E. Nolting =

German Vizeadmiral

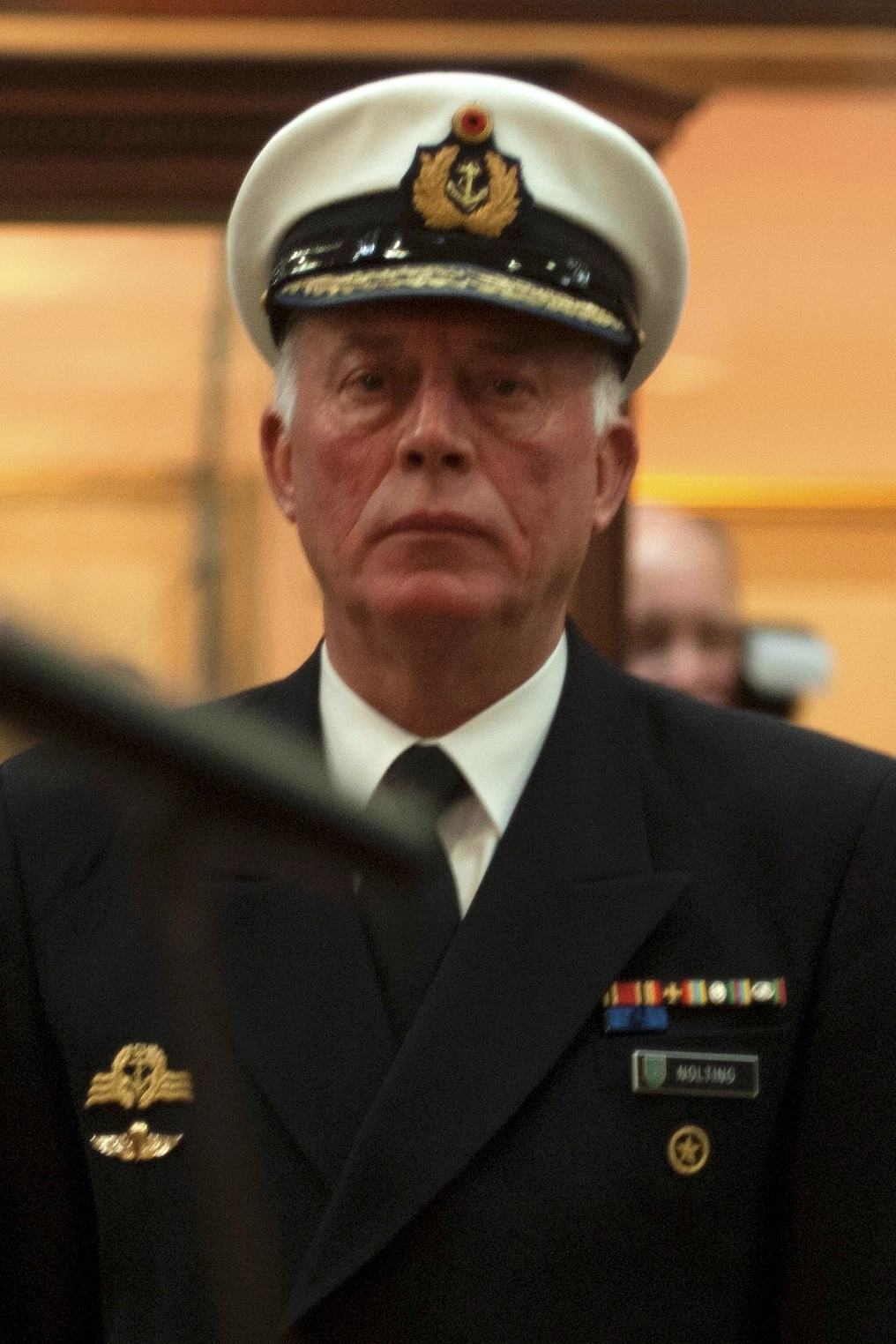
Nolting in 2008

Wolfgang Edgar Nolting (born 6 April 1948 in Wilhelmshaven) is a retired German Vizeadmiral and former Inspector of the Navy from 2006 until 2010.

Military offices
Preceded by Vizeadmiral Lutz Feldt	Inspector of the Navy; April 2006–28 April 2010	Succeeded by Vizeadmiral Axel Schimpf
Preceded by Konteradmiral Frank Ropers	Chief of the Navy Office; 2000 – 2003	Succeeded by Konteradmiral Ulrich Otto
