= Clayton Kenny =

Canadian boxer (1928–2015)

Clayton Kenny (1928 – 2015) was a boxer from Canada, who competed for his native country at the 1952 Summer Olympics in Helsinki, Finland, where he was eliminated in the second round of the Men's Lightweight (–60 kg) division by István Juhász of Hungary. Kenny was born in Ottawa, Ontario and died in Carleton Place, Ontario.
