= Philip Stratford =

Canadian translator, professor and poet (1927–1999)

- Born: October 13, 1927; Chatham, Ontario
- Died: April 23, 1999 (aged 71)
- Occupations: translator, professor and poet

Philip Stratford (October 13, 1927 – April 23, 1999) was a Canadian translator, professor and poet. Winner of the 1988 Governor General's Award, Stratford was also well recognized for his translations of works by Antonine Maillet, René Lévesque and Robert Melaçon and published articles on English and French-Canadian literature and translation. He has been collected by libraries.

Born in Chatham, Ontario, he completed an Honours Bachelor in English at the University of Western Ontario in 1950 and later completed a doctorate at Sorbonne in Paris.

Stratford's career as an educator began in France where he taught English between 1950 and 1952. After his return to Canada, he lectured at the Assumption University of Windsor, and afterwards worked for the English Department of the University of Western Ontario. Finally, in 1969, he became Department chair for the English Department at the Université of Montréal and held that role until 1975. As Department chair, he founded the comparative literature program. Stratford retired in 1992.

== Works ==
Stratford translated a variety of genres including fiction, memoirs and poetry from French to English, such as Pélagie by Antonine Maillet, Memoirs by René Lévesque and Blind Painting by Robert Melançon for which he received national critical acclaim. In addition to these, he also translated the works of Diane Hébert, Félix Leclerc, Claire Martin and Marie-Claire Blais.

Graham Greene and Stratford became friends in the 1970s when Stratford edited with Greene's active participation The Portable Graham Greene (Viking Press, 1973.) After Greene's death Stratford revised and enlarged this collection, republished by Penguin Press in 1994. Stratford published original works including a bilingual edition of a children's book 1976, his own memoir in 1999, and a collection of poems he wrote after he retired. Stratford also wrote a number of scholarly articles.

Works	Genre	Role
Pélagie: The Return to a Homeland (Antonine Maillet)	fiction	Translator
Memoirs (René Lévesque)	memoir	Translator
Blind Painting (Robert Melaçon)	poetry	Translator
Second Chance (Diane Hébert)	non-fiction	Translator
In an Iron Glove (Claire Martin)		Translator
The Kite and the Island (Félix Leclerc)	fiction	Translator
The Madman (Félix Leclerc)	fiction	Translator
The Devil is Loose! (Antonine Maillet)	fiction	Translator
Pierre (Marie-Claire Blais)	fiction	Co-translator with David Lobdell
The Portable Graham Greene (1973, 1994)	fiction (collection)	editor
Olive: A dog – Un chien	children's book	Author
Hawthorn House	autobiography	Author
The Range of Space: Poems	poetry	Author
Verse Portraits	poetry	Author
All The Polarities: Comparative Studies in Contemporary Canadian Novels in English and French	article	Writer
Canada's Two Literatures: A Search for Emblems	article	Writer
French-Canadian Literature in Translation	article	Writer
Bibliography of Canadian Books in Translation: French to English and English to French	reference	Writer

== Professional roles ==
Stratford, apart from translating, writing and teaching, took on various roles as part of the academic community . He co-founded the Literary Translators' Association of Canada in 1975 and served as its secretary for 2 years. He was also president of the Canadian Association of Comparative Literature between 1974 and 1976 and initiated the first issue devoted to comparative essays on Canadian topics in the Canadian Review of Comparative Literature, a journal sponsored by this association

Between 1974 and 1976, Stratford was part of the board of directors of the Humanities Research Council of Canada, and was a member of the Canadian Federation for the Humanities and Social Sciences' Translation Committee between 1976 and 1977. The Humanities Research Council of Canada was originally a non-governmental institution but is now part of the Canadian Federation for the Humanities and Social Sciences.

== Honours and citations ==
Stratford won the 1988 Governor General's award for his translation of Second Chance by Diane Hébert. At the awards, he announced that he would donate $5,000 to the Diane Herbert Foundation. He had been nominated twice before, once in 1986 for his translation of Peinture aveugle by Robert Melançon and once in 1987 for his translation of Crache à pic, by Antonine Maillet. He also won the Gabrielle Roy Prize for his article All the Polarities: Comparative Studies in Contemporary Canadian Novels in French and English (1986).

In addition to these awards, the bilingual conference Aux Canadas was held in 1993 in Stratford's honour.
