= Gheorghe Fiat =

Romanian boxer

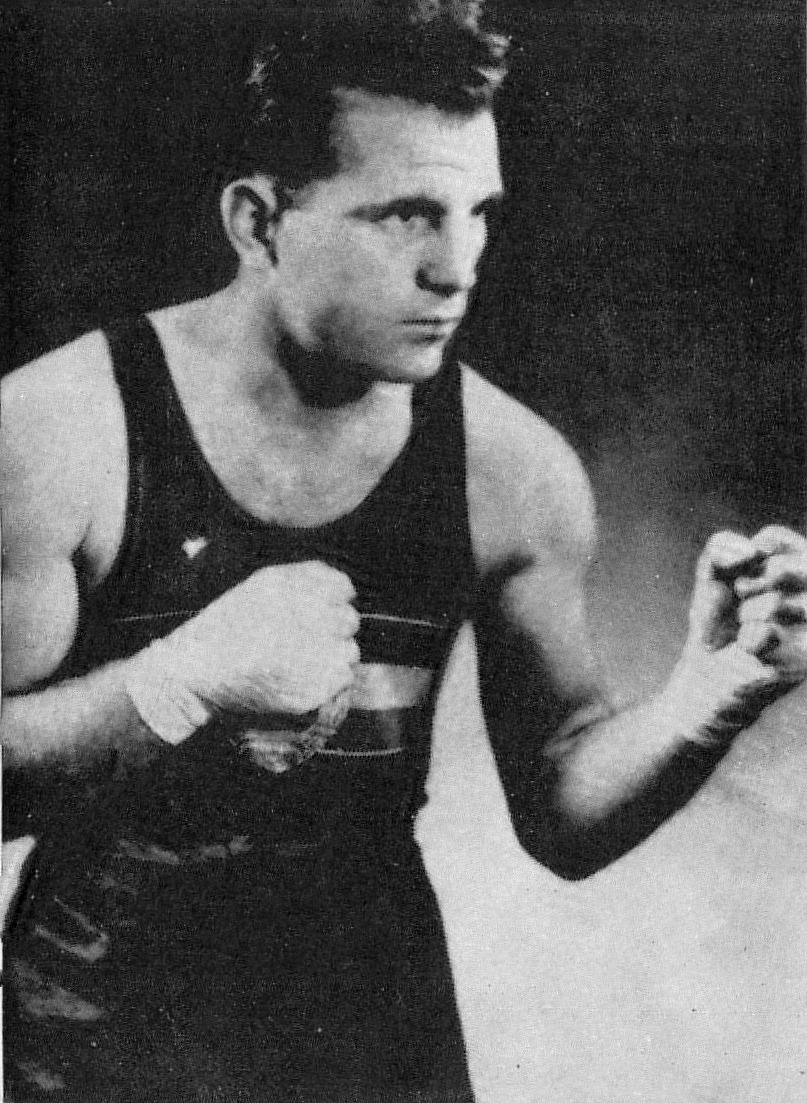

Personal information
- Born: 14 January 1929 Reşiţa, Romania
- Died: 22 August 2010 (aged 81)

Sport
- Sport: Boxing
- Club: Steaua București
- Coached by: Géza Tóth
Medal record
Representing Romania
Romania National Amateur Boxing Championships
| Gold medal – first place | 1948 Bucharest | -58 kg |
| Gold medal – first place | 1949 Bucharest | -58 kg |
| Gold medal – first place | 1950 Bucharest | -58 kg |
| Gold medal – first place | 1951 Bucharest | -60 kg |
| Gold medal – first place | 1952 Bucharest | -60 kg |
| Gold medal – first place | 1953 Galați, Brașov and Bucharest | -60 kg |
| Gold medal – first place | 1956 Bucharest | -60 kg |
Olympic Games
| Bronze medal – third place | 1952 Helsinki | -60 kg |

Gheorghe Fiat (14 January 1929 – 22 August 2010) was a lightweight boxer from Romania who won a bronze medal at the 1952 Olympics. He took up boxing following his brother Peter, and later won seven national titles. He retired in 1957 and had a long career as a coach for his club Steaua Bucareşti and as an organizer of boxing tournaments for youths.
