= Erkki Pakkanen =

Finnish boxer

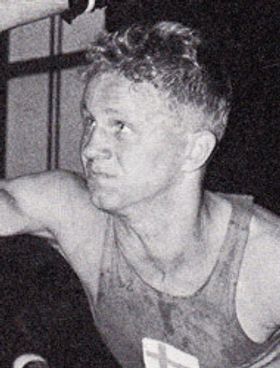

Personal information
- Born: 19 April 1930 Elimäki, Finland
- Died: 23 April 1973 (aged 43) Kouvola, Finland

Sport
- Sport: Boxing
Medal record
Representing Finland
Olympic Games
Bronze medal – third place	1952 Helsinki	Lightweight

Erkki Olavi Pakkanen (19 April 1930 – 23 April 1973) was an amateur lightweight boxer from Finland who won a bronze medal at the 1952 Olympics.

Pakkanen took up boxing in 1947 and won the Finnish junior title in 1949. He never held a senior national title, and qualified for the Helsinki Olympics by winning the Olympic trials. At the Olympics, he lost in a semifinal to the eventual winner Aureliano Bolognesi. Earlier in 1950 he seriously injured his right hand. The injury recurred in 1953 forcing Pakkanen to retire from boxing. He later ran a taxi company that he founded in 1958. Shortly after his 43rd birthday, Pakkanen died of a heart attack at a horse racing track while watching his son Jarmo competing. In 2008 he was inducted into the Finnish Boxing Hall of Fame.

== 1952 Olympic results ==
Below are the results of Erkki Pakkenen, a Finnish lightweight boxer who competed at the 1952 Helsinki Olympics:

- Round of 32: bye
- Round of 16: defeated Petros Nazarbegian (Iran) by decision, 3–0
- Quarterfinal: defeated Vicente Matute (Venezuela) by decision, 3–0
- Semifinal: lost to Aureliano Bolognesi (Italy) by decision, 0–3 (was awarded bronze medal)
