= Frederick Reardon =

British boxer

Freddie Reardon
Personal information
- Nationality: British
- Born: 19 April 1931; Deptford, London, England
- Died: 1 May 2006 (aged 75); Bromley, London, England

Sport
- Sport: Boxing

Frederick Albert Reardon (19 April 1931 – 1 May 2006) was a British boxer. He fought as Freddie Reardon and competed in the men's lightweight event at the 1952 Summer Olympics.

He won the 1952 Amateur Boxing Association British lightweight title, when boxing out of the Downham Community ABC.
