= Hans-Werner Wohlers =

German boxer

Personal information
- Nationality: German
- Born: 11 December 1933; Hamburg, Germany
- Died: 24 July 2011 (aged 77); Beckdorf, Germany

Sport
- Sport: Boxing

Hans-Werner Wohlers (11 December 1933 – 24 July 2011) was a German boxer. He competed in the men's lightweight event at the 1952 Summer Olympics.
