= Benjamin Enríquez =

Filipino boxer

Personal information
- Nationality: Filipino
- Born: September 30, 1930 Davao City, Philippine Islands
- Died: March 13, 2014 (aged 83) Canoga Park, Los Angeles, U.S.

Sport
- Sport: Boxing

Benjamin B. Enríquez (September 30, 1930 – March 13, 2014) was a Filipino boxer. He competed in the men's lightweight event at the 1952 Summer Olympics.
