= Gert Jeschonnek =

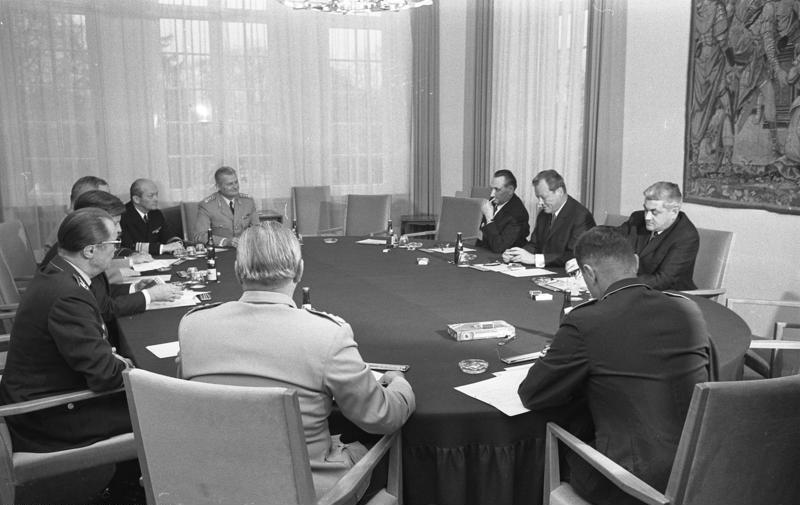
- Jeschonnek sitting in the far left corner
- Born: 30 October 1912; Liegnitz, Province of Silesia, Kingdom of Prussia, German Empire
- Died: 18 April 1999 (aged 86); Bonn, Germany
- Relatives: Hans Jeschonnek (brother)
- Military career
- Allegiance: Weimar Republic; Nazi Germany; Allied-occupied Germany; West Germany
- Branch: Reichsmarine; Kriegsmarine; Mine Sweeping Administration; Blank Office; German Navy
- Service years: 1930–1935; 1935–1945; 1945–1947; 1952–1955; 1955–1971
- Rank: Vizeadmiral
- Conflicts: World War II

Gert Gustav Paul Jeschonnek (30 October 1912 – 18 April 1999) was an officer in the Kriegsmarine during World War II. Following World War II, he became commander (Inspector of the Navy) of the post-war German Navy.

== Promotions ==
- 1 April 1930 Offizieranwärter (Officer Candidate)
  - Joined the Reichsmarine (Class of 1930)
- 9 October 1930 Seekadett (Sea Cadet)
- 1 January 1932 Fähnrich zur See (Officer Cadet)
- 1 Juli 1932 Obermaat
- 1 April 1934 Oberfähnrich zur See (Senior Officer Cadet)
- 1 October 1934 Leutnant zur See (2nd Lieutenant)
- 1 June 1936 Oberleutnant zur See (1st Lieutenant)
- 1 April 1939 Kapitänleutnant (Lieutenant Captain)
- 1 April 1943 Korvettenkapitän (Corvette Captain / Lieutenant Commander)
- 19 November 1955 Fregattenkapitän (Frigate Captain / Commander) with effect from 1 November 1955
- 28 May 1958 Kapitän zur See (Captain at Sea / Captain / Colonel) with effect from 1 May 1955
- 7 August 1963 Flottillenadmiral (Flotilla Admiral)
- 1 April 1965 Konteradmiral (Rear Admiral)
- 11 June 1965 Vizeadmiral (Vice Admiral)

== Awards and decorations ==
- German Reich Sports Badge in Bronze
- Wehrmacht Long Service Award, 4th Class
- Iron Cross (1939), 2nd and 1st Class
- High Seas Fleet Badge
- War Merit Cross (1939), 2nd and 1st Class with Swords
- Legion of Merit on 1 November 1968
- Order of Merit of the Federal Republic of Germany, Knight Commander's Cross of the Order of Merit (Großes Verdienstkreuz mit Stern, Great Cross of Merit with Star) on 15 February 1971
- Legion of Honour, Commander on 1 October 1971

Military offices
Preceded by Vizeadmiral Karl-Adolf Zenker	Inspector of the Navy; Oktober 1967–September 1971	Succeeded by Vizeadmiral Heinz Kühnle
