= Luis Castro Leiva =

Venezuelan political philosopher (1943–1999)

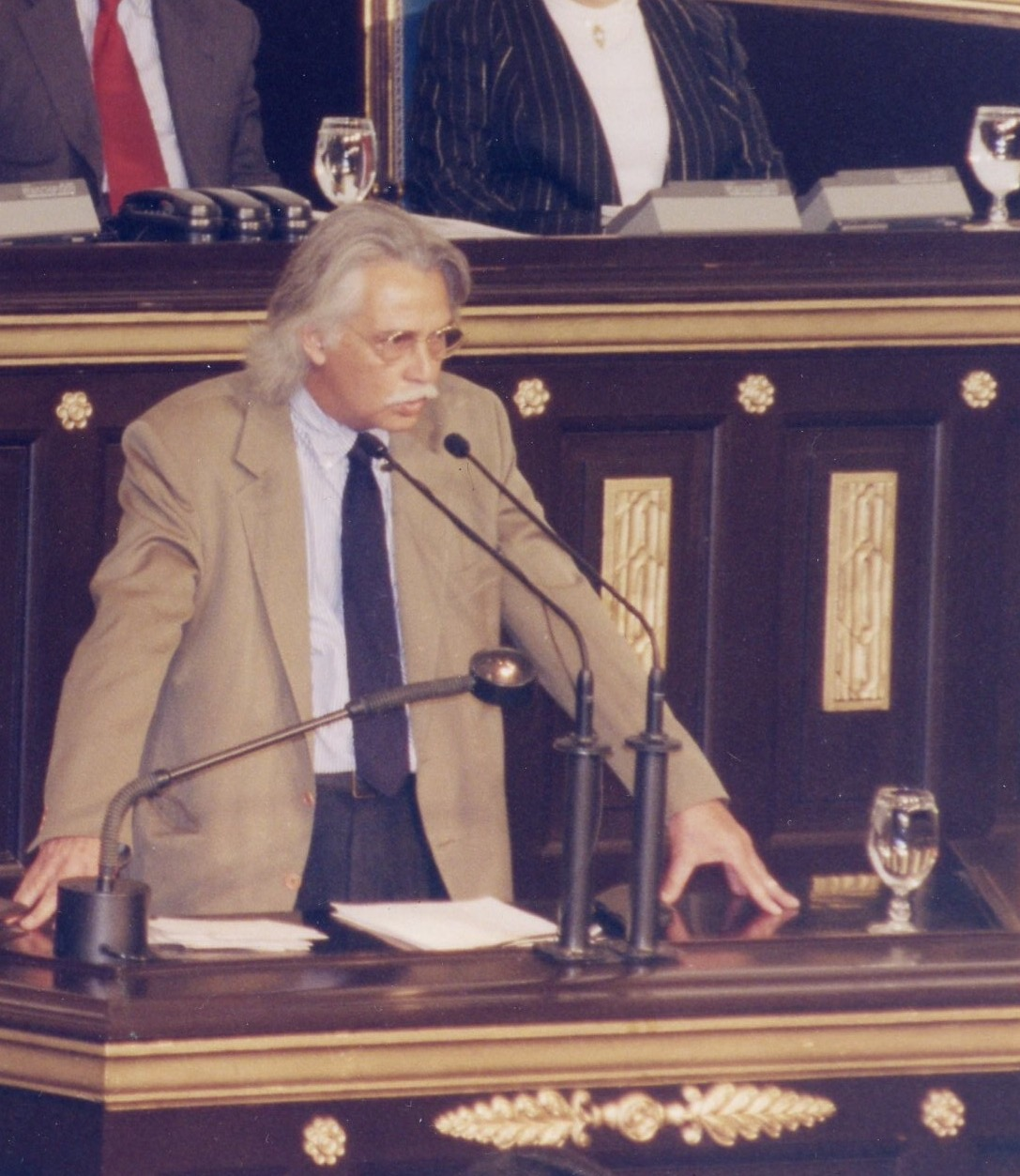
- Luis Castro Leiva in 1998
- Born: February 23, 1943; Caracas, Venezuela
- Died: April 8, 1999 (aged 56); Chicago, United States
- Other name: Luis Castro
- Education: Central University of Venezuela
- Occupations: Professor of Politics and Philosophy, writer, columnist
- Years active: 1966 – 1999
- Employers: Central University of Venezuela; Simón Bolívar University
- Known for: Criticism on Hugo Chávez

Luis Hernan Castro Leiva (23 February 1943 – 8 April 1999) was a Venezuelan political philosopher, historian, writer and columnist. He is known for his televised speech on 23 January 1998 for the National Congress in which he warns against bolivarianism, cronyism and atavistic absolutism. He was one of the country's foremost advocates for democracy and an outspoken critic of Hugo Chávez, which he considered a populist. Castro is also credited with introducing rugby to Venezuela.
