= Roger Cuche =

Swiss boxer (1928–1999)

Personal information
- Nationality: Swiss
- Born: 27 October 1928; La Chaux-de-Fonds, Switzerland
- Died: 10 April 1999 (aged 70); La Chaux-de-Fonds, Switzerland

Sport
- Sport: Boxing

Roger Cuche (27 October 1928 – 10 April 1999) was a Swiss boxer. He competed in the men's lightweight event at the 1952 Summer Olympics.
