= Enrique Sáinz =

Spanish field hockey player (1917–1999)

Personal information
- Nationality: Spanish
- Born: 19 August 1917 Madrid, Spain
- Died: 27 April 1999 (aged 81) Madrid, Spain

Sport
- Sport: Field hockey

Enrique Sáinz (19 August 1917 – 27 April 1999) was a Spanish field hockey player. He competed in the men's tournament at the 1948 Summer Olympics.
