= Dieter Wellershoff =

German admiral (1933–2005)

Admiral Dieter Wellershoff
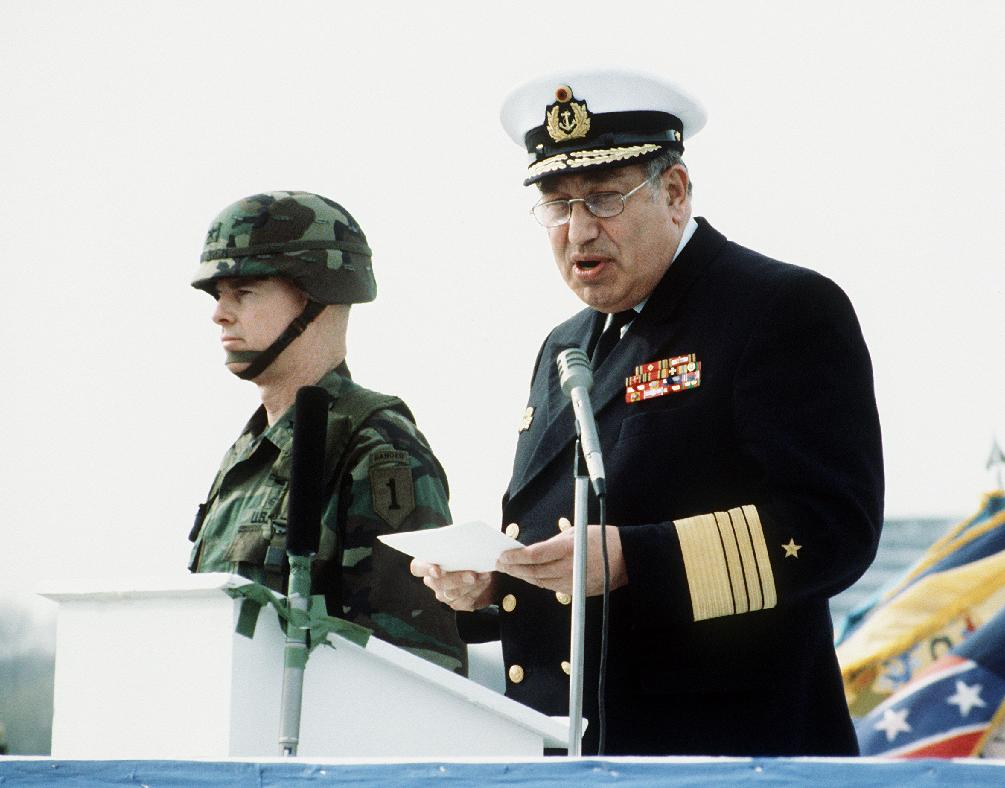
- Admiral Wellershoff at the farewell ceremony of the 1st Infantry Division of the US Army in 1991

President of the Federal Academy for Security Policy
- In office 1992–1995
- Preceded by: Office Established
- Succeeded by: Günter Joetze

Inspector General of the Bundeswehr
- In office 1 October 1986 – 30 September 1991
- Chancellor: Helmut Kohl
- Preceded by: Wolfgang Altenburg
- Succeeded by: Klaus Naumann

Inspector of the Navy
- In office 1 April 1985 – 30 September 1986
- Preceded by: Ansgar Bethge
- Succeeded by: Hans-Joachim Mann

Deputy Inspector of the Navy
- In office 1 April 1984 – 31 March 1985
- Preceded by: Hanshermann Vohs
- Succeeded by: Hein-Peter Weyher

Head of the Bundeswehr Command and Staff College
- In office 1 April 1981 – 31 March 1984
- Preceded by: Heinz von zur Gathen
- Succeeded by: Dieter Clauß

Personal details
- Born: 16 March 1933 (age 93) Dortmund, Westphalia, Weimar Republic
- Died: 16 July 2005 (aged 72) Euskirchen, North Rhine-Westphalia Germany
- Spouse: Emma Johanna Wefer (m. 1958)
- Children: 3

Military service
- Allegiance: West Germany (1957–1990); Germany (1990–1991)
- Branch/service: German Navy
- Years of service: 1957–1991
- Rank: Admiral

Dieter Wellershoff (16 March 1933 – 16 July 2005) was a German Admiral and Inspector General of the Bundeswehr from 1986 until 1991.

He was the first Inspector-General of the Bundeswehr who was not of a Wehrmacht background. He was also the first to visit the USSR, doing so in May 1989.

== Biography ==
Dieter Wellershoff was born the son of a mining engineer and grew up in the Lower Rhine region. After graduating from the Fichte Gymnasium in Krefeld, Wellershoff began studying Mechanical engineering at RWTH Aachen University in the winter semester of 1953/54, where he joined the Corps Marko-Guestphalia fraternity. He left his studies in the winter semester of 1956/57 and joined the German Navy as an Officer candidate on April 1, 1957.

From 1960 to 1964 he was watch officer and commander of a Minesweeper, subsequently advisor in the Naval Office and operations officer on the destroyer Schleswig-Holstein.

From 1967 to 1969, he completed the 9th Admiral Staff Course at the Bundeswehr Command and Staff College in Hamburg and received the General Heusinger Prize for the top student in the course. During the course, he wrote a scholarly paper entitled "The International Legal Situation of the Kiel Canal and the Territorial Sea in the Baltic Sea and its Accesses – Implications for the Passage of Warships in Peacetime." He then became an advisor in the Armed Forces Command Staff. From 1971 to 1973, he commanded the destroyer Hessen, then served as an operations officer at the Fleet Command in Glücksburg, and subsequently as commander of the Mine Action Flotilla in Wilhelmshaven. In 1977, he became head of the Armaments Staff in the Naval Command Staff. From 1981 to 1984, he was Commandant of the Bundeswehr Command and Staff College in Hamburg-Blankenese. From April 1, 1985 until 30 September 1986 he was Inspector of the Navy, and from 1 October 1986, until 30 September 1991, as Admiral, he was the ninth Inspector General of the Bundeswehr. He was the youngest Inspector General to date and the first who had not served in the Wehrmacht. His predecessor was General Wolfgang Altenburg.

The most important event of his term in office was German reunification, which entailed the merging of the Bundeswehr and the National People's Army under the motto "Army of Unity." This historically unique process is widely regarded in retrospect as a success and is considered Wellershoff's greatest achievement.

From 1981 to 1983, Wellershoff was Vice President of the Clausewitz Society. From 1992 to 1995, he was the founding president of the Federal Academy for Security Policy. He was also a lecturer at the Institute for International Law of Peace and Armed Conflict at Ruhr University Bochum.

Military offices
Preceded by New Office	President of the Federal Academy for Security Policy; 1992–1995	Succeeded by Günter Joetze
Preceded by General Wolfgang Altenburg	Inspector General of the Bundeswehr; 1 October 1986–30 September 1991	Succeeded by General Klaus Naumann
Preceded by Vizeadmiral Ansgar Bethge	Inspector of the Navy; April 1985-September 1986	Succeeded by Vizeadmiral Hans-Joachim Mann
Preceded by Konteradmiral Hanshermann Vohs	Deputy Inspector of the Navy; 1 April 1984 – 31 March 1985	Succeeded by Konteradmiral Hein-Peter Weyher
Preceded by Generalmajor Heinz von zur Gathen	Head of the Bundeswehr Command and Staff College; 1 April 1981 – 31 March 1984	Succeeded by Generalmajor Dieter Clauß
