= István Juhász (boxer) =

Hungarian boxer

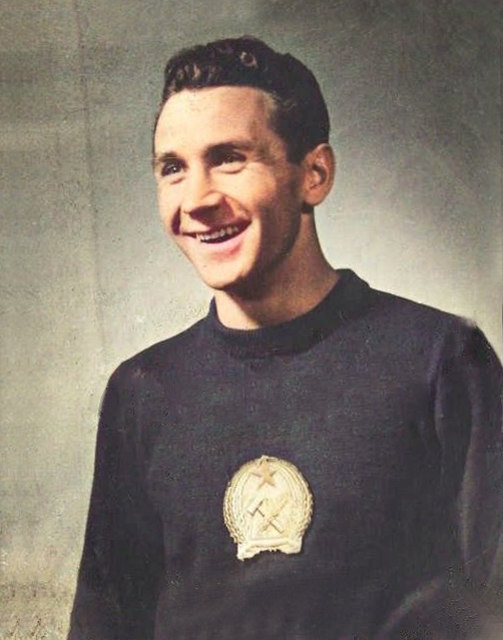
- István Juhász in 1953

Personal information
- Nationality: Hungarian
- Born: 5 June 1931 (age 95) Kecskemét, Hungary

Sport
- Sport: Boxing

István Juhász (born 5 June 1931) is a Hungarian boxer. He competed in the men's lightweight event at the 1952 Summer Olympics.
