= List of castles in Schleswig-Holstein =

Numerous castles are found in the German state of Schleswig-Holstein. These buildings, some of which have a history of over 1000 years, were the setting of historical events, domains of famous personalities and are still imposing buildings to this day.

This list encompasses castles described in German as Burg (castle), Festung (fort/fortress), Schloss (manor house) and Palais/Palast (palace). Many German castles after the Middle Ages were mainly built as royal or ducal palaces rather than as a fortified building.

== Kiel ==
- Kiel Castle
- Adliges Gut Seekamp in Kiel-Schilksee

== Kreis Dithmarschen ==
- die ehemalige Steller Burg in Stelle-Wittenwurth
- Adliges Gut Friedrichshof in Dingen

== Kreis Herzogtum Lauenburg ==
- Lauenburger Schloss
- Gut Basthorst
- Herrenhaus in Gudow
- Gut Gülzow in Gülzow (Lauenburg)
- Adliges Gut Wotersen in Roseburg
- Gut Steinhorst in Steinhorst
- Gut Kogel in Sterley
- Herrenhaus in Ratzeburg

== Lübeck ==
- Schloss Rantzau
- die ehemalige slawische Burg Bucu
- die Lübecker Burg (beim Burgtor)
- Liubice
- Stülper Huk
- der Pöppendorfer Ringwall (Fluchtburg)
- die Landwehr, weitenteils als Landgraben
- das Holstentor
- das Mühlentor
- Gut Brandenbaum
- Gut Dänischburg
- Gut Dummersdorf
- Gut Falkenhusen
- Gut Groß Steinrade
- Gut Israelsdorf
- Gut Karlshof
- Gut Klein Steinrade
- Gut Krempelsdorf
- Gut Krummesse
- Gut Lauerhof
- Gut Mönkhof
- Gut Moisling
- Gut Mori
- Gut Niemark
- Gut Niendorf
- Gut Padelügge
- Gut Roggenhorst
- Gut Schönböken
- Gut Strecknitz
- Gut Wesloe

== Neumünster ==
- Wittorfer Burg in Neumünster
- Margarethenschanze in Neumünster-Einfeld
- Adliges Gut Neumünster

== Kreis Nordfriesland ==
- Schloss vor Husum
- Lembecksburg bei Borgsum auf Föhr
- Tinnumburg in Sylt-Ost
- Gut Fresenhagen in Fresenhagen
- Gut Gaarde in Sprakebüll
- Gut Hogelund in Sprakebüll
- Herrenhaus Hoyerswort in Oldenswort
- Adliges Gut Immenstedt in Immenstedt (Nordfriesland)
- Adliges Gut Karrhardehof in Klixbüll
- Adliges Gut Klixbüllhof in Klixbüll
- Adliges Gut Lütjenhorn in Achtrup
- Adliges Gut Mirebüll in Bredstedt (?)
- Adliges Gut Seegaarden auf Pellworm

== Kreis Ostholstein ==
- Eutiner Schloss
- Jagdschlösschen am Ukleisee in Eutin
- Schloß Weissenhaus
- Burg Glambek in Burg auf Fehmarn
- Hasselburg in Altenkrempe
- Wittenwiewerbarg in Dahme

== Kreis Pinneberg ==
- Hetlinger Schanze
- Langes Tannen (Uetersen)
- Gut Brodau bei Neustadt in Holstein
- Gut Bürau in Neukirchen (Ostholstein)
- Adliges Gut Farve in Wangels
- Gut Friederikenhof in Wangels
- Gut Gaarz in Oldenburg in Holstein
- Gut Godderstorf in Neukirchen (Ostholstein)
- Gut Görtz in Heringsdorf (Ostholstein)
- Gut Güldenstein in Harmsdorf (Ostholstein)
- Gut Hasselburg in Altenkrempe
- Hof Kiekbusch in Bosau
- Gut Löhrstorf in Neukirchen (Ostholstein)
- Gut Manhagen in Manhagen
- Gut Mönchneversdorf in Schönwalde am Bungsberg
- Gut Petersdorf in Lensahn
- Gut Putlos in Oldenburg in Holstein
- Hof Redingsdorf in Süsel
- Gut Satjewitz in Neukirchen (Ostholstein)
- Gut Sebent in Damlos
- Gut Seekamp in Neukirchen (Ostholstein)
- Gut Sierhagen in Altenkrempe
- Gut Siggen in Heringsdorf (Ostholstein)
- Gut Stendorf in Kasseedorf
- Gut Testorf in Wangels
- Gut Weißenhaus in Wangels

== Kreis Rendsburg-Eckernförde ==
- ehemalige Burg Hanerau in Hanerau-Hademarschen
- Königsburg in Kosel
- ehemalige Schwonsburg in Winnemark
- Adliges Gut Alt-Bülk in Strande
- Adliges Gut Altenhof in Altenhof (bei Eckernförde)
- Gut Augustenhof in Osdorf
- Adliges Gut Bienebek in Thumby
- Adliges Gut Birkenmoor in Schwedeneck
- Adliges Gut Borghorst in Osdorf
- Adliges Gut Büstorf in Rieseby
- Adliges Gut Damp in Damp
- Adliges Gut Dänisch-Nienhof in Schwedeneck
- Gut Dengelsberg in Bovenau
- Gut Deutsch-Nienhof in Westensee
- Adliges Gut Dörphof in Dörphof
- Gut Eckhof in Dänischenhagen
- Gut Emkendorf in Emkendorf
- Adliges Gut Eschelsmark in Kosel
- Gut Georgenthal in Bovenau
- Adliges Gut Gereby (Karlsburg) in Winnemark
- Gut Groß Nordsee in Krummwisch
- Adliges Gut Hemmelmark in Barkelsby
- Gut Hohenschulen in Achterwehr
- Adliges Gut Hohenstein in Barkelsby
- Gut Hütten in Hütten (Schleswig)
- Adliges Gut Kaltenhof in Dänischenhagen
- Gut Karlsminde in Waabs
- Gut Karlsburg in Winnemark
- Gut Klein Königsförde in Krummwisch
- Adliges Gut Klein Nordsee in Felde
- Gut Kluvensiek in Bovenau
- Gut Knoop in Altenholz
- Adliges Gut Krieseby in Thumby
- Gut Lindhöft in Noer
- Adliges Gut Louisenlund in Güby
- Adliges Gut Ludwigsburg in Waabs
- Adliges Gut Maasleben in Holzdorf
- Adliges Gut Marienthal in Eckernförde
- Gut Marutenhof in Achterwehr
- Gut Neu Bülk in Strande
- Adliges Gut (Schloss) Noer
- Adliges Gut Ornum in Kosel
- Gut Osterrade in Bovenau
- Gut Projensdorf in Altenholz
- Gut Quarnbek in Quarnbek
- Adliges Gut Rathmannsdorf in Felm
- Adliges Gut Rögen in Barkelsby
- Adliges Gut Rosenkranz in Schinkel (Gemeinde)
- Adliges Gut Saxdorf in Waabs
- Gut Schierensee in Schierensee
- Adliges Gut Schirnau in Bünsdorf
- Gut Schönhagen in Brodersby (Schwansen)
- Gut Sehestedt in Sehestedt
- Adliges Gut Staun in Thumby
- Gut Steinwehr in Bovenau
- Gut Warleberg in Neuwittenbek
- Adliges Gut Windeby in Eckernförde
- Adliges Gut Wulfshagen in Tüttendorf
- Gut Neubarkelsby in Barkelsby Barkelsby

== Kreis Schleswig-Flensburg ==
- Gottorp in Schleswig
- Burg Böge-Schloss in Ausacker
- Burg in Brodersby (Angeln)
- Danewerk (mostly in Dannewerk. Margarethenwall in Brodersby and Waldemarsmauer in Dannewerk are parts of the same structure)
- Burg Hesselgaard in Ulsnis
- Holmer Schanze in Wohlde
- Schloss Glücksburg in Glücksburg
- Adliges Gut Böelschubyhof in Böel
- Adliges Gut Buckhagen in Rabel
- Adliges Gut Dänisch Lindau in Boren
- Adliges Gut Dollrott in Dollrottfeld
- Gut Drült in Stoltebüll
- Adliges Gut Düttebüll in Kronsgaard
- Adliges Gut Fahrenstedt in Böklund
- Gut Falkenberg in Lürschau
- Adliges Gut Flarupgaard in Saustrup
- Adliges Gut Freienwillen in Langballig
- Adliges Gut Gelting in Gelting
- Gut Grödersby in Grödersby
- Adliges Gut Grünholz in Sterup
- Adliges Gut Loitmark in Kappeln
- Adliges Gut Lundsgaard in Grundhof
- Gut Mohrkirchen in Mohrkirch (ehemals Kloster Mohrkirchen)
- Adliges Gut Oestergaard in Steinberg
- Adliges Gut Ohrfeld in Niesgrau
- Gut Olpenitz in Kappeln
- Gut Priesholz in Rabenholz
- Adliges Gut Roest bei Kappeln
- Adliges Gut Rundhof in Stangheck
- Ehemaliges Adliges Gut Satrupholm in Satrup
- Gut Saxtorf in Rieseby
- Adliges Gut Stubbe in Rieseby
- Adliges Gut Toesdorf in Oersberg
- Kanzleigut Tolkschuby in Tolk
- Gut Winningen in Schaalby

== Kreis Segeberg ==
- Traventhal House, a former royal hunting lodge and ducal seat in Traventhal
- Siegesburg in Bad Segeberg
- Motte in Bimöhlen
- Gut Alt-Erfrade in Tarbek
- Gut Bahrenhof in Bahrenhof
- Adliges Gut Bramstedt (Schloss) in Bad Bramstedt
- Gut Borstel in Sülfeld
- Gut Glasau in Glasau
- Gut Kaden in Alveslohe
- Gut Kamp in Travenhorst
- ehemaliges Staatsgut Pettluis in Daldorf
- Gut Rohlstorf in Rohlstorf
- Gut Seedorf in Seedorf (Kreis Segeberg)
- Gut Springhirsch in Nützen
- Adliges Gut Stockseehof in Stocksee
- Gut Wensin in Wensin

== Kreis Steinburg ==
- Schloss Breitenburg in Itzehoe
- Schloss Wallberg in Willenscharen
- Schloss Friedrichsruhe in Drage (Steinburg) (1787 abgebrochen)
- Schloss Heiligenstedten in Heiligenstedten
- Kaaksburg in Kaaks
- Eselsfeldburg in Heiligenstedten
- Gut Drage in Drage (Steinburg)
- Gut Hohenlockstedt in Hohenlockstedt
- Gut Kleve in Kleve
- Gut Krummendiek in Kleve
- Gut Mehlbek in Mehlbek
- Gut Springhoe in Lockstedt

== Kreis Pinneberg ==
- Schlossinsel Barmstedt, Barmstedt
- Drostei (Pinneberg)
- Herrenhaus Haseldorf

== Kreis Plön ==
- ehemaliges Jagdschloss Blomenburg in Selent
- Schloss Plön
- Gut (Schloss) Ascheberg in Ascheberg (Holstein)
- Gut Bockhorn in Ruhwinkel
- Gut Bothkamp in Bothkamp
- Gut Bredeneek in Lehmkuhlen
- Gut Bundhorst in Stolpe (Holstein)
- Gut Depenau in Stolpe (Holstein)
- Adliges Gut Dobersdorf in Dobersdorf
- Gut Friedburg in Lammershagen
- Gut Großrolübbe in Kletkamp
- Gut Güsdorf in Wittmoldt
- Adliges Gut Hagen in Probsteierhagen
- Gut Helmstorf in Helmstorf
- Gut Hohenhof in Rantzau
- Gut Hohensasel in Rantzau
- Gut Horst in Stolpe (Holstein)
- Gut Kletkamp in Kletkamp
- Gut Lammershagen in Lammershagen
- Gut Löhndorf in Wankendorf
- Gut Neudorf in Hohwacht (Ostsee)
- Gut Neuhaus in Giekau
- Adliges Gut Panker in Panker
- Gut Perdoel in Belau
- Gut Rantzau in Rantzau
- Gut Rastorf in Rastorf
- Gut Rixdorf in Lebrade
- Gut Ruhleben in Bösdorf (Holstein)
- Gut Salzau in Fargau-Pratjau
- Gut Schmoel in Schwartbuck
- Gut Schönböken in Ruhwinkel
- Gut Wahlstorf in Wahlstorf (Holstein)
- Gut Waterneverstorff in Behrensdorf (Ostsee)
- Gut Wittenberg in Martensrade
- Gut Wittmoldt in Wittmoldt

== Kreis Stormarn ==
- Adliges Schloss Reinbek in Reinbek
- Adliges Schloss in Reinfeld (abgerissen)
- Herzögliches Schloss Rethwisch in Rethwisch (Stormarn)
- Schloss Ahrensburg in Ahrensburg
- Adliges Gut Altfresenburg in Bad Oldesloe
- Adliges Gut Blumendorf in Bad Oldesloe
- Gut Frauenholz in Rethwisch (Stormarn)
- Adliges Gut Grabau in Grabau
- Adliges Gut Hohenholz in Pölitz
- Adliges Gut Höltenklinken in Rümpel
- Park und Gut Jersbek in Jersbek
- Adliges Gut Krummbek in Lasbek
- Gut Mönkhagen in Mönkhagen
- Gut Neverstaven in Travenbrück
- Adliges Gut Nütschau in Travenbrück
- Gut Rethwischhof in Rethwisch (Stormarn)
- Adliges Gut Rohlfshagen in Rümpel
- Adliges Gut Schulenburg in Pölitz
- Adliges Gut Tralau in Travenbrück
- Adliges Gut Tremsbüttel in Tremsbüttel
- Adliges Gut Trenthorst und Wulmenau in Westerau
- Gut Treuholz in Rethwisch (Stormarn)
- Adliges Gut Wulfsdorf in Ahrensburg

== See also ==
- List of castles
- List of castles in Germany
