= De la Ferrière =

De la Ferrière is a surname. Notable people with the surname include:

- Charles Grangier de la Ferrière (1738–1794), French general
- Laurence de la Ferrière (born 1957), French mountaineer, explorer and writer
- Serge Raynaud de la Ferriere (1916–1962), French Initiatic philosopher
