= Hohenfelder Mühlenau =

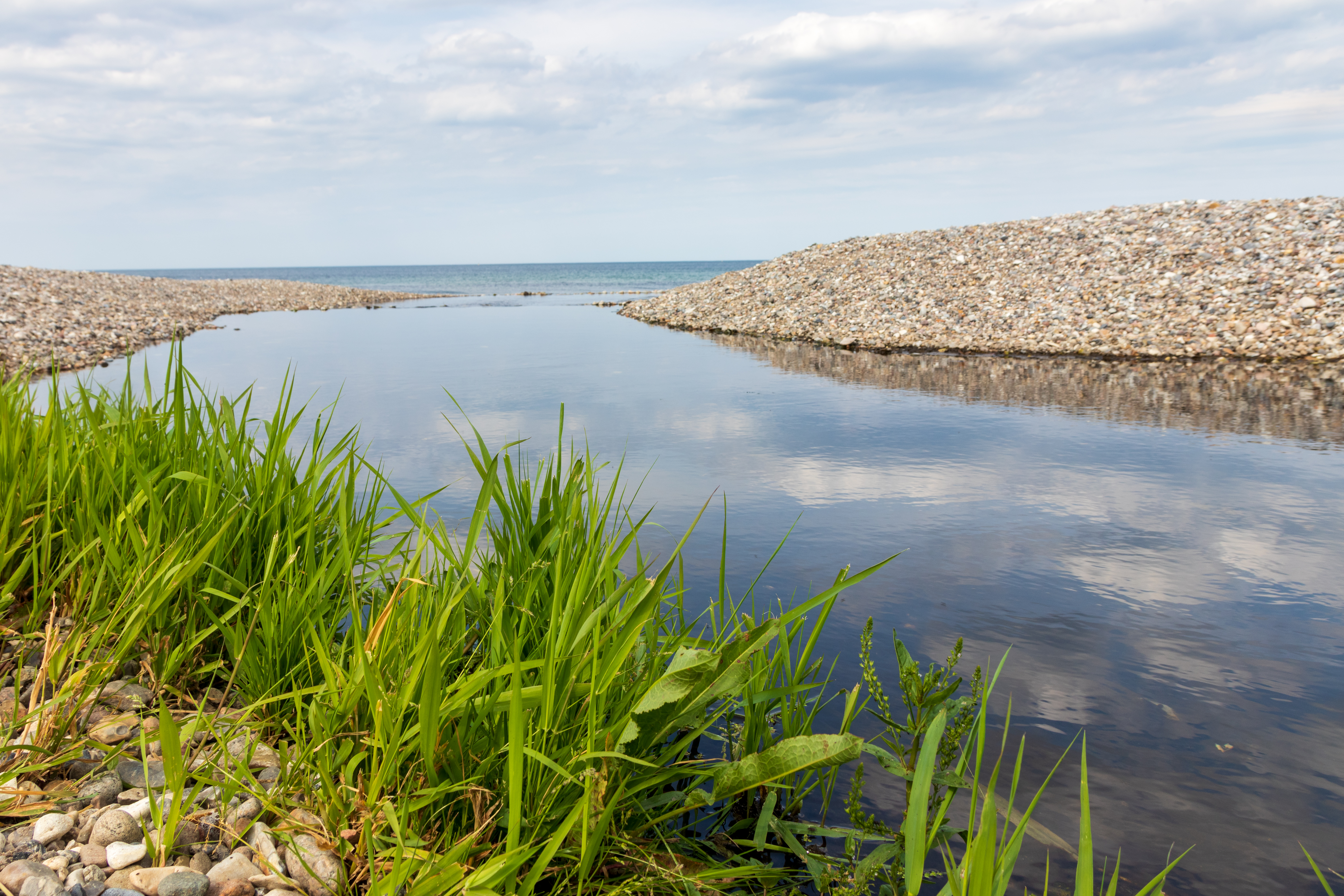

Location
- Country: Germany
- State: Schleswig-Holstein
- District: Plön

Physical characteristics
- Source
  - location: Source: Selenter See between Köhn-Pülsen and Giekau-Warderhof
  - coordinates: 54°19′09″N 10°27′48″E
- Mouth
  - location: Kiel Bay near Hohenfelde-Malmsteg
  - coordinates: 54°23′07″N 10°30′35″E
- Length: 10 km

Basin features
- River system: Hohenfelder Mühlenau
- Landmarks: Villages: Köhn, Schwartbuck, Hohenfelde

The Hohenfelder Mühlenau is a stream, about 10 km (6.2 mi) long, in the district of Plön in northeast part of the North German state of Schleswig-Holstein.

The Hohenfelder Mühlenau is classified as a gravel-bedded stream. It begins at the Selenter See in Holstein and, together with the Salzau / Hagener Au, is one of its natural tailwaters. The course of the stream has an incline of about 4%, a length of 10 km (6.2 mi), a width of generally between 2 and 4 metres (7 and 13 ft) and a depth of 0.1 to 1.5 metres (4 to 59 in). It is interrupted by two barriers, the mill at Köhn, which has fallen into ruins leaving just a foundation behind, and poses an obstacle of 2 to 3 metres (7 to 10 ft). This hurdle will now be bypassed, in line with the EU Water Framework Directive, using a drop structure (Sohlgleite) which will be built next to the existing building. The Hohenfelde Mill is another obstacle of about 4 metres (13 ft), which is partly bypassed with a fish pass. The existing 50 hp Francis turbine is still an obstacle however. At the end of its course the Hohenfelder Mühlenau discharges into the Baltic Sea with a water quality class of I-II.

== See also ==
- List of rivers of Schleswig-Holstein
