= Kosel, Germany =

Kosel Koslev
- Municipality
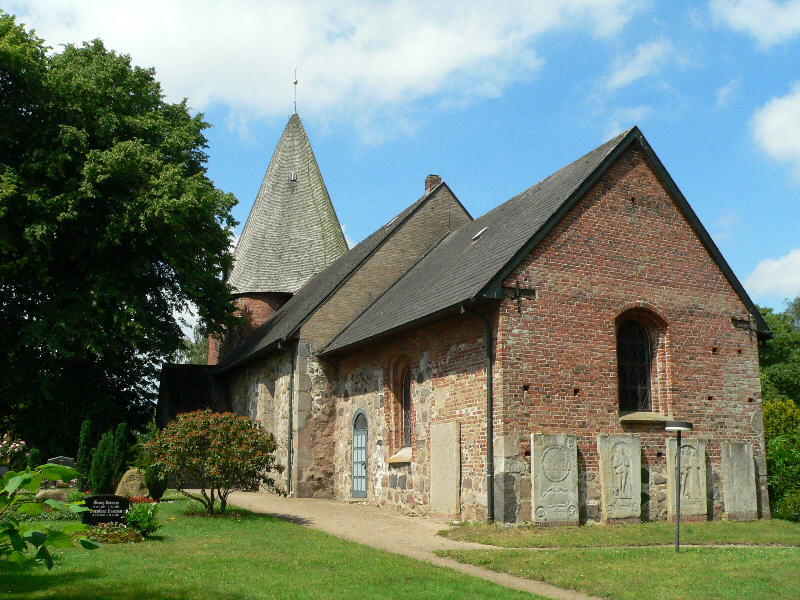
- Saint Lawrence Church

- Coat of arms

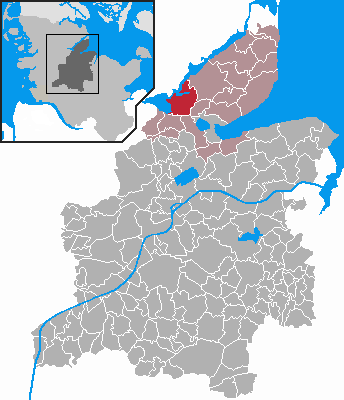
- Location of Kosel; Koslev within Rendsburg-Eckernförde district
- Interactive map of Kosel; Koslev
- Location within Germany Location within Schleswig-Holstein
- Coordinates: 54°30′26″N 9°45′24″E
- Country: Germany
- State: Schleswig-Holstein
- District: Rendsburg-Eckernförde
- Municipal assoc.: Schlei-Ostsee

Government
  - Mayor: Jochen Greve (CDU)

Area
  - Total: 30 km^{2} (12 sq mi)
- Elevation: 9 m (30 ft)

Population (2025-12-31)
  - Total: 1,392
  - Density: 46/km^{2} (120/sq mi)
- Time zone: UTC+01:00 (CET)
  - Summer (DST): UTC+02:00 (CEST)
- Postal codes: 24354
- Dialling codes: 04354
- Vehicle registration: RD
- Website: www.gemeinde-kosel.de

Kosel (Danish: Kosel or Koslev) is a municipality in the district of Rendsburg-Eckernförde, in Schleswig-Holstein, Germany; it took its present form in 1977 when the formerly independent municipality of Bohnert was merged into Kosel, and today includes the villages Hülsen, Lundshof, Missunde, Ornum, and Weseby.

== Geography and transport ==
Kosel lies about 5 km northwest of Eckernförde, directly on the Schlei inlet. Federal Highway 76 (Bundesstraße 76), which runs from Eckernförde to Schleswig, passes through the municipality's territory. Rail connections are available in Eckernförde and Rieseby. South of Kosel lies Lake Bültsee.
