= Salzau =

Stream in Germany

Location
- Country: Germany
- State: Schleswig-Holstein
- District: Plön
- Reference no.: DE: 965529

Physical characteristics
- Source
  - location: Selenter See
  - coordinates: 54°19′22″N 10°23′32″E
- Mouth
  - location: Passader See
  - coordinates: 54°20′38″N 10°19′59″E
- Length: 8.5 km (5.3 mi)

Basin features
- Progression: Hagener Au→ Baltic Sea

The Salzau is a stream, roughly 8.5 kilometres (5.3 mi) long, in the district of Plön in the North German state of Schleswig-Holstein.

== Course ==
Together with the Mühlenau it is one of the two tailstreams of the lake known as the Selenter See. At its outlet into the Salzau near the district Fargau of Fargau-Pratjau, the water level of the lake can be controlled. On its way to the Baltic Sea it flows into the Passader See. It leaves this as the Hagener Au, which after the last few metres discharges into the Baltic between Laboe and Stein.

== Origin of the name ==
The Salzau gives its name to the village of Salzau in the municipality of Fargau-Pratjau, whose manor house Gut Salzau was called Schloss Salzau (Salzau Castle) locally and now houses the Salzau state cultural centre.

== See also ==
- List of rivers of Schleswig-Holstein
