= Wilhelm Wattenbach =

German paleographer (1819–1897)

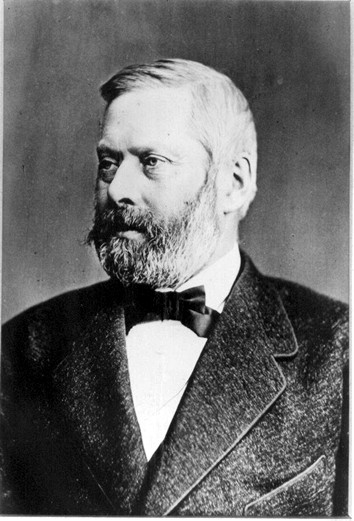
- Born: 22 September 1819; Rantzau, Holstein
- Died: 20 September 1897 (aged 77); Frankfurt, Hesse-Nassau
- Occupation: Historian

Wilhelm Wattenbach (22 September 1819 – 20 September 1897), was a German historian.

He was born at Rantzau in Holstein. He studied philology at the universities of Bonn, Göttingen and Berlin, and in 1843 he began to work upon the Monumenta Germaniae Historica. In 1855 he was appointed archivist at Breslau; in 1862 he became a professor of history at Heidelberg, and ten years later a professor at Berlin, where he was a member of the directing body of the Monumenta Germaniae Historica and a member of the academy. He died at Frankfurt.

According to the Encyclopædia Britannica Eleventh Edition, Wattenbach was distinguished by his thorough knowledge of the chronicles and other original documents of the Middle Ages, and his most valuable work was done in this field.

== Works ==
- Deutschlands Geschichtsquellen im Mittelalter bis zur Mitte des XIII Jahrhunderts (1858), his principal book, a guide to the sources of the history of Germany in the Middle Ages, several editions. 1893 ed.
- Anleitung zur lateinischen Paläographie (Leipzig, 1869, and again 1886)
- Das Schriftwesen im Mittelalter (Leipzig, 1871, and again 1896)
- Beiträge zur Geschichte der christlichen Kirche in Böhmen und Mähren (Vienna, 1849)
- Geschichte des römischen Papsttums (Berlin, 1876)
- Anleitung zur griechischen Paläographie (Leipzig, 1867, and again 1895).

== See also ==
- Privilegium Maius
