= Selenter See =

Lake in Plön District, Schleswig-Holstein, Germany

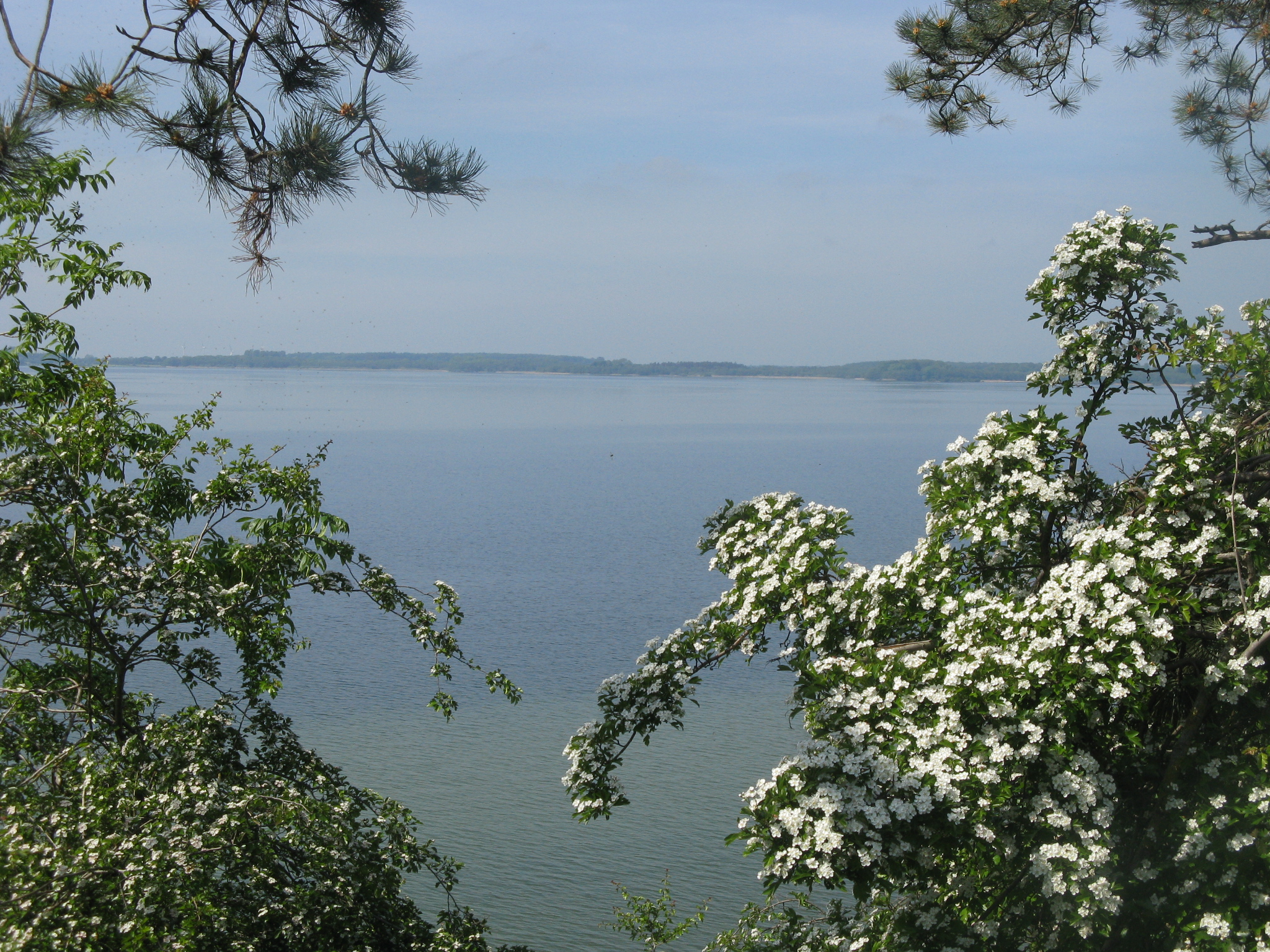
- The lake near Selent

- Location within Schleswig-Holstein
- Location: Schleswig-Holstein
- Coordinates: 54°18′20″N 10°26′43″E
- Primary outflows: Mühlenau, Salzau
- Basin countries: Germany
- Surface area: 22.4 km^{2} (8.6 sq mi)
- Average depth: 34 m (112 ft)
- Surface elevation: 37 m (121 ft)
- Settlements: Selent

The Selenter See (German pronunciation) is the second-largest lake in the North German state of Schleswig-Holstein, after the Großer Plöner See. It lies at an elevation of 37 m above sea level (NN) and has an area of 22.4 km^{2}.

The Selenter See, which lies near the village of Selent in the district of Plön, is 34 m deep. The lake drains into the Baltic Sea through the Hohenfelder Mühlenau, only 10 km long, to the north and by the Salzau to the northwest.

The formation of the Selenter See goes back to the ice sheets of the Weichselian glaciation, which hollowed out a basin and simultaneously formed ridges of terminal moraine up to 132 m high in the east and 90 m high in the south. From a geological point of view the lake is a so-called "tongue basin lake" or Zungenbeckensee.

The lake is well-known inter alia for plentiful supply of fish such as eel, perch, pike, and large and small whitefish and large quantities of roach.

== Bird reserve ==
There is a 3,060 hectares (7,600 acres) bird reserve called the Selenter See-Gebiet which covers the lake and its bordering reed beds and carr areas as well as the Gottesgabe Wood. It is an important breeding, moulting and resting area for numerous birds including the kingfisher, bittern, whooper swan, goosander, great crested grebe, crane and sea eagle. The reserve is managed by a charitable organisation, the LLUR.

== See also ==
- List of lakes in Schleswig-Holstein
