= Dänischenhagen (Amt) =

- Amt
- Coat of arms

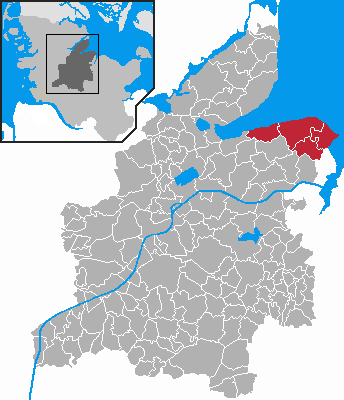
- Map of Rendsburg-Eckernförde highlighting Dänischenhagen
- Interactive map of Dänischenhagen
- Location within Germany Location within Schleswig-Holstein
- Coordinates: 54°26′N 10°08′E
- Country: Germany
- State: Schleswig-Holstein
- District: Rendsburg-Eckernförde
- Seat: Dänischenhagen
- Subdivisions: 4 municipalities

Government
  - Mayor: Holger Klink (CDU)

Area
  - Total: 71.88 km^{2} (27.75 sq mi)

Population (2025-12-31)
  - Total: 8,775
  - Density: 122.1/km^{2} (316.2/sq mi)
- Time zone: UTC+01:00 (CET)
  - Summer (DST): UTC+02:00 (CEST)
- Website: www.amt-daenischenhagen.de

Dänischenhagen is an Amt ("collective municipality") in the district of Rendsburg-Eckernförde, in Schleswig-Holstein, Germany. The seat of the Amt is in Dänischenhagen.

The Amt Dänischenhagen consists of the following municipalities:

- Dänischenhagen
- Noer
- Schwedeneck
- Strande
