= Nicolas Luckner =

German officer in French service

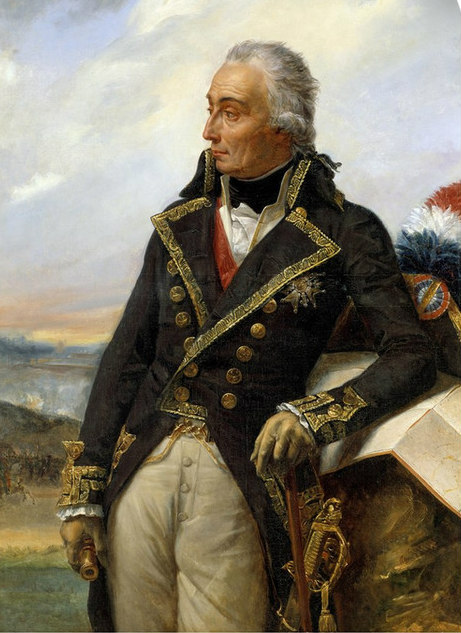
- Marshal Luckner
- Born: Johann Nikolaus Luckner; 12 January 1722; Cham, Electorate of Bavaria
- Died: 4 January 1794 (aged 71); Paris, French Republic
- Military career
- Allegiance: Electorate of Bavaria; Electorate of Hanover; Dutch Republic; Kingdom of France; Kingdom of France; French Republic
- Rank: Marshal of France
- Commands: Armée du Rhin; Armée du Nord
- Conflicts: Seven Years' War; Battle of Emsdorf; Battle of Corbach; Battle of Nauheim; French Revolutionary Wars; War of the First Coalition; Defence of France; French invasion of the Austrian Netherlands
- Awards: Names inscribed on the Arc de Triomphe, Order of the White Eagle

Nicolas, Count Luckner (German: Johann Nikolaus Graf Luckner; 12 January 1722, Cham – 4 January 1794, Paris) was a German officer in French service who rose to become a Marshal of France.

Luckner grew up in Kötzting, in eastern Bavaria and received his early education from the Jesuits in Passau. Before entering the French service, Luckner spent time in the Bavarian, Dutch and Hanoverian armies. He fought as a commander of hussars during the Seven Years' War (1756–1763) in the Hanoverian Army against the French. Luckner joined the French army in 1763 with the rank of lieutenant general. In 1784 he became a Danish count.

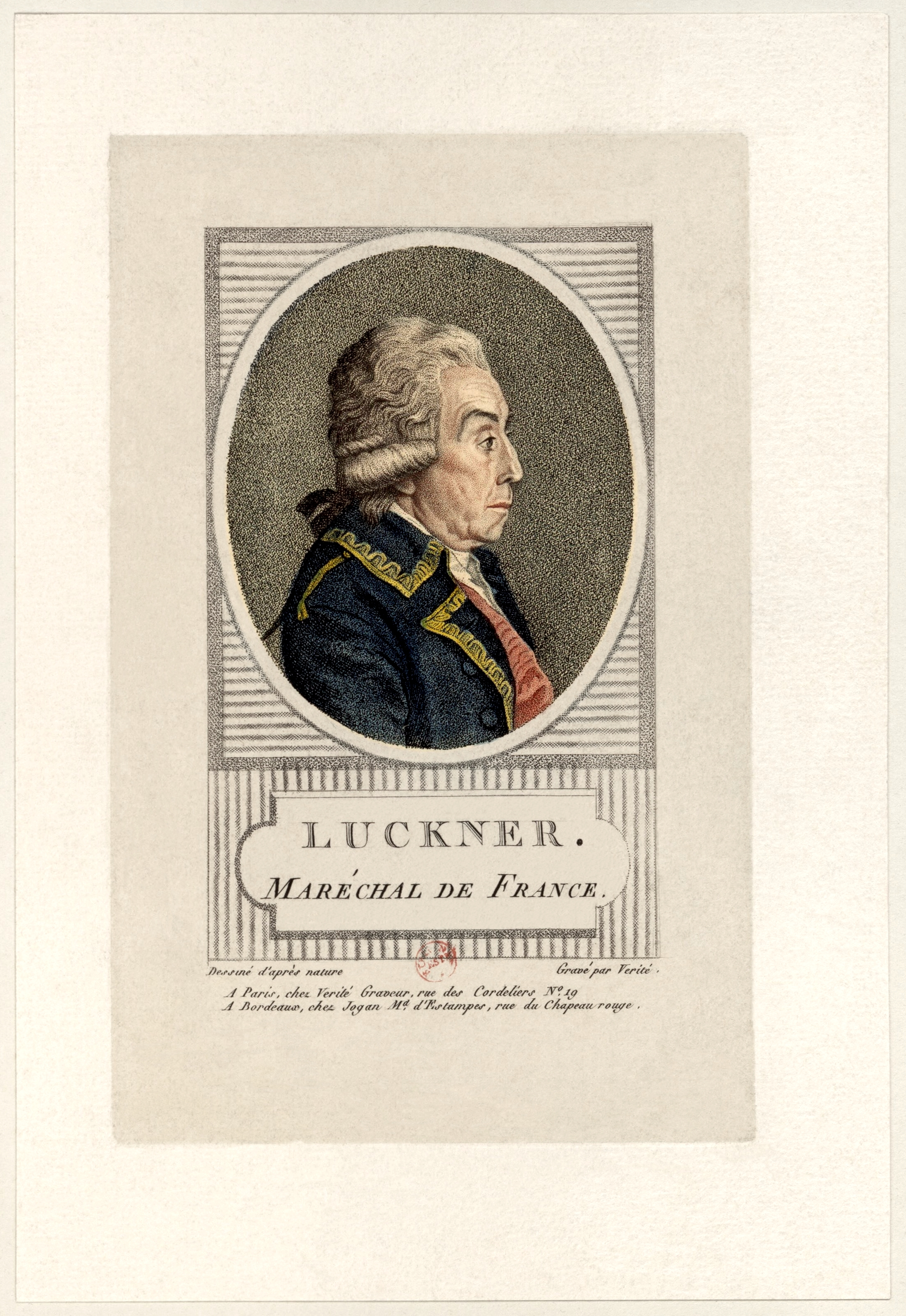
Luckner, portrait of 1792.

He supported the French Revolution, and the year 1791 saw Luckner become a Marshal of France. In 1791–92 Luckner served as the first commander of the Army of the Rhine. In April 1792, Rouget de Lisle dedicated to him the Chant de Guerre pour l'Armée du Rhin (War Song of the Army of the Rhine), which was to become better known as the Marseillaise.

As commander of the Army of the North in 1792 he captured the Flemish cities of Menen and Kortrijk, but then had to retreat towards Lille. After the flight of Lafayette (August 1792) he was made generalissimo with orders to build a Reserve Army near Châlons-sur-Marne. However, the National Convention was not satisfied with his progress and Choderlos de Laclos was ordered to support or replace him. Luckner, now over 70 years of age, then asked for dismissal (granted in January 1793) and went to Paris.

He was arrested by the Revolutionary Tribunal and sentenced to death. He died by the guillotine in Paris in 1794.

The carillon of the town hall in the Bavarian town of Cham rings the Marseillaise every day at 12.05 p.m. to commemorate the city's most famous son, Nikolaus Graf Luckner.

He was the great-grandfather of Count Felix von Luckner (1881–1966), a German naval officer who commanded the famed merchant raider SMS Seeadler (1916–1917) during World War I .

Luckner owned Krummbek Manor in Holstein.
