= Schlesen =

- Municipality
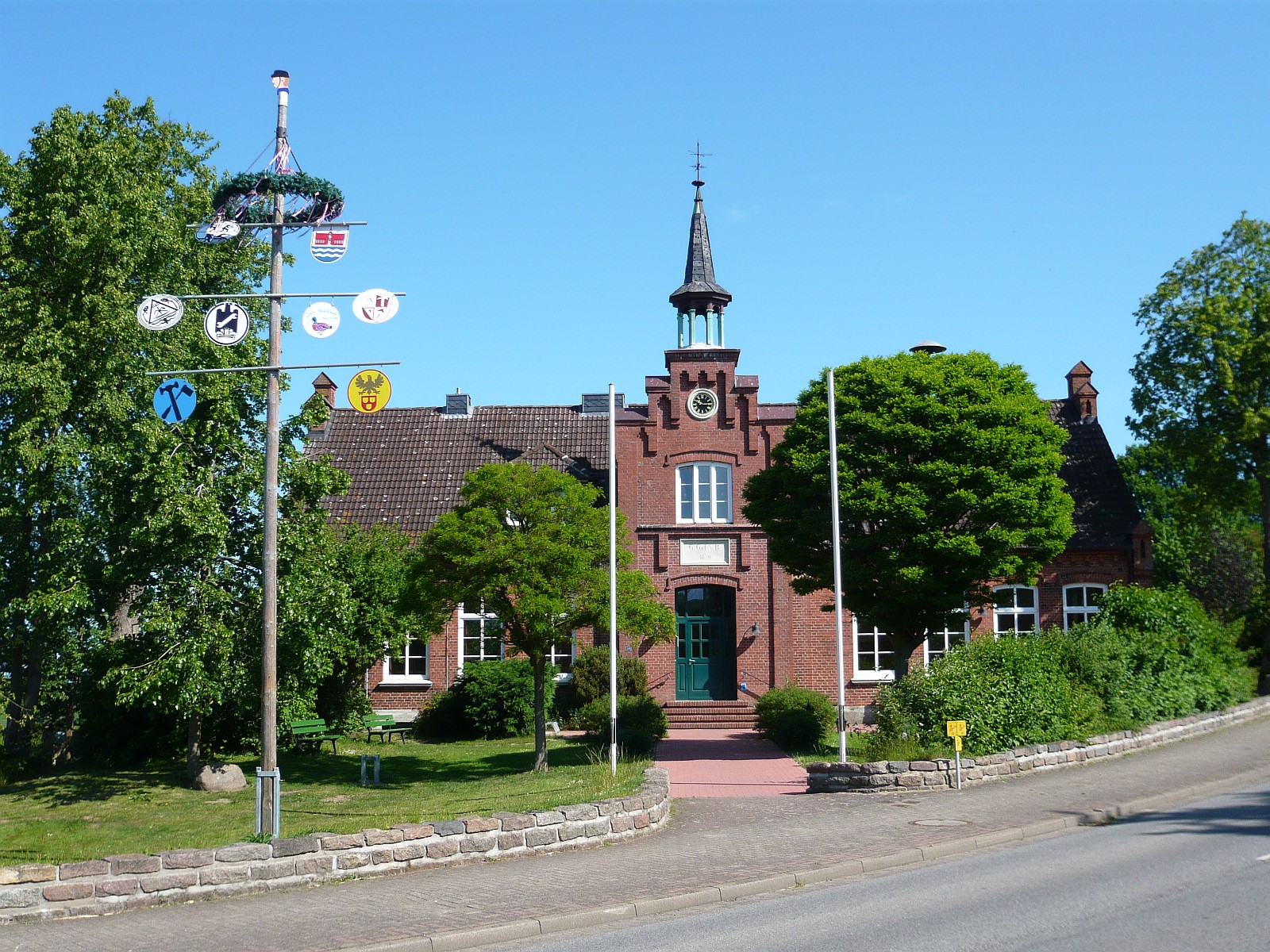
- Village community building, former school

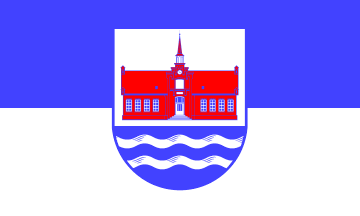
- Flag Coat of arms

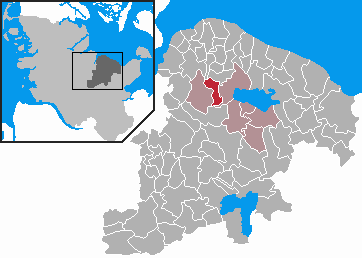
- Location of Schlesen within Plön district
- Interactive map of Schlesen
- Location within Germany Location within Schleswig-Holstein
- Coordinates: 54°19′N 10°20′E
- Country: Germany
- State: Schleswig-Holstein
- District: Plön
- Municipal assoc.: Selent/Schlesen

Government
  - Mayor: Hans-Harald Harländer (SPD)

Area
  - Total: 7.99 km^{2} (3.08 sq mi)
- Elevation: 34 m (112 ft)

Population (2025-12-31)
  - Total: 555
  - Density: 69.5/km^{2} (180/sq mi)
- Time zone: UTC+01:00 (CET)
  - Summer (DST): UTC+02:00 (CEST)
- Postal codes: 24256
- Dialling codes: 04303
- Vehicle registration: PLÖ
- Website: www.schlesen.com

Schlesen is a municipality in the district of Plön, in Schleswig-Holstein, Germany.
