= Capture of Porrentruy =

Battle of the War of the First Coalition

Coordinates: 47.4181°N 7.0778°E

- Part of the War of the First Coalition
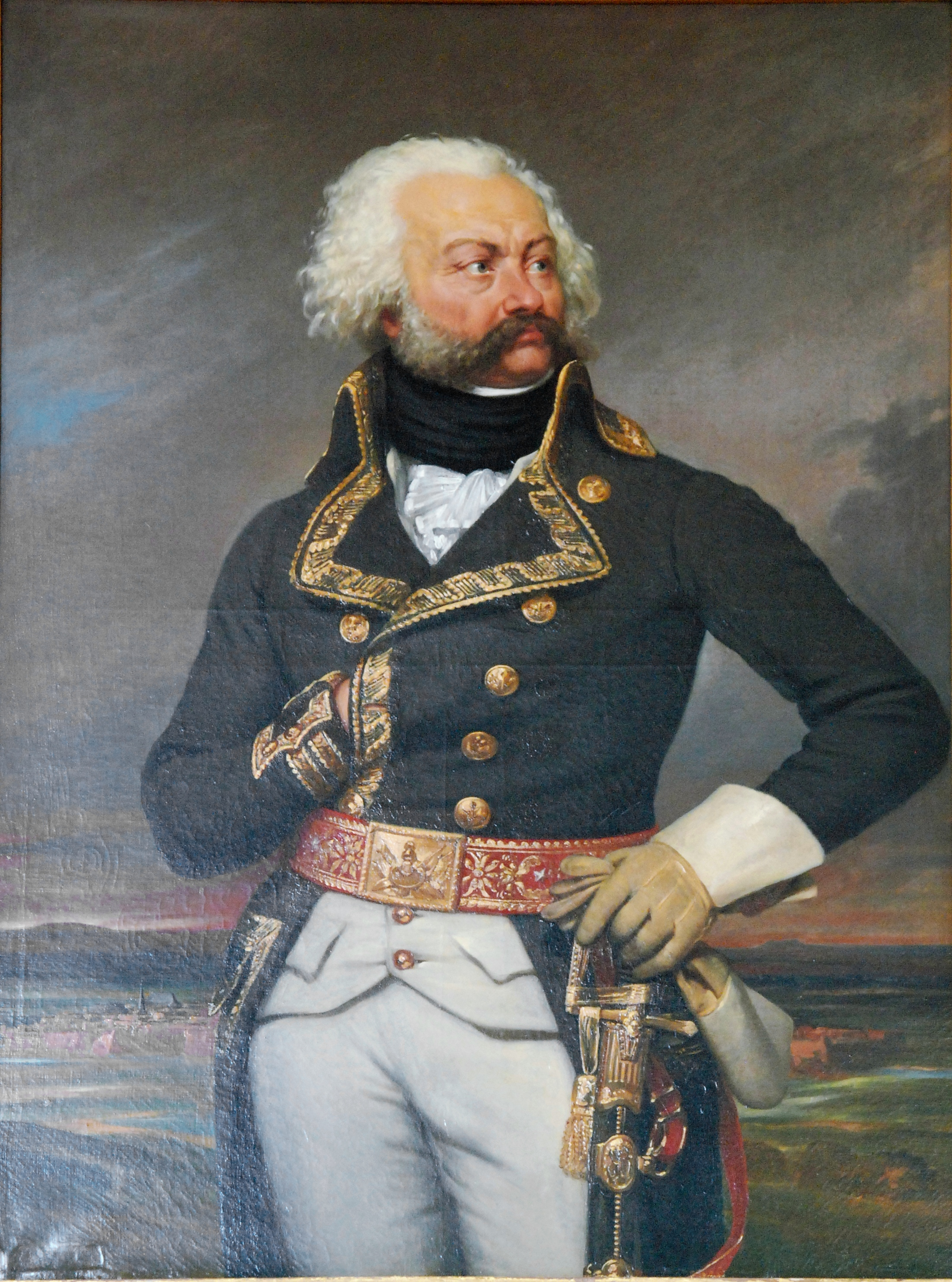
- Count Custine, who seized Porrentuy and would later lead the Army of the Rhine
Date	28 April 1792
Location	Porrentruy
Result	French victory: Incorporation into the Rauracian Republic

Belligerents
(Constitutional Cabinet of Louis XVI) Kingdom of France	(Habsburg monarchy) Austria: Prince-Bishopric of Basel

Commanders and leaders
(Constitutional Cabinet of Louis XVI) Comte de Custine (Constitutional Cabinet of Louis XVI) Charles de Ferrière	Bishop von Roggenbach

Strength
~3,000	400

The capture of Porrentruy was a siege of the Swiss town of Porrentruy. The town was held by Austria and attacked by the French. The event occurred on 28 April 1792 and resulted in victory for the French forces. This engagement marked the commencement of the War of the First Coalition.

== Siege ==
On 20 April 1792, France declared war on Francis II, Holy Roman Emperor, who had presented Louis XVI with an ultimatum concerning the possessionary princes of the Alsace five days prior. Coalition (French) forces were sluggish in exploiting their advantage, prompting Nicolas Luckner, commander of the Armée du Rhin, to opt for an offensive against the stronghold of Porrentruy to avert an invasion. At the far end of the Basse-Alsace, situated between Lauterbourg, Landau and Weissembourg, Luckner marshaled 12,000 men.

Luckner instructed Adam Philippe, Comte de Custine, to lead an advance into the province of Porrentruy, then under the jurisdiction of the Prince-Bishopric of Basel. This measure aimed to safeguard this section of the French border from encroachment. Accompanied by Colonel Charles Grangier de La Ferriere, commander of the 23rd Infantry Regiment, as his second-in-command, Custine led a force of 2,000 comprising three infantry battalions, an artillery company and approximately 300 dragoons. They marched into the province and demanded surrender. Although the garrison consisted of 400 Austrian soldiers, the Prince-Bishop chose not to resist a siege and relocated the garrison to Bienne. Consequently, Custine captured Porrentruy without encountering resistance and was able to fortify his position on Laumont mountain, effectively safeguarding the valleys of Fribourg, Bienne, Basel and Solothurn.

== Sources ==
- Victoires, conquêtes, désastres, revers et guerres civiles des Français, volume 7
