= Mucheln =

- Municipality
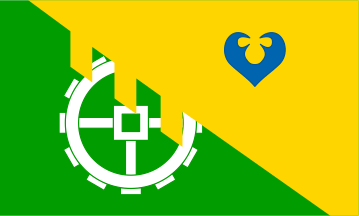
- Flag Coat of arms

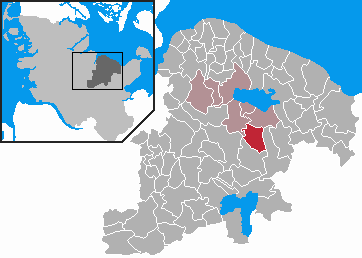
- Location of Mucheln within Plön district
- Interactive map of Mucheln
- Location within Germany Location within Schleswig-Holstein
- Coordinates: 54°15′N 10°25′E
- Country: Germany
- State: Schleswig-Holstein
- District: Plön
- Municipal assoc.: Selent/Schlesen

Government
  - Mayor: Wilhelm Bern (CDU)

Area
  - Total: 14.28 km^{2} (5.51 sq mi)
- Elevation: 40 m (130 ft)

Population (2025-12-31)
  - Total: 586
  - Density: 41.0/km^{2} (106/sq mi)
- Time zone: UTC+01:00 (CET)
  - Summer (DST): UTC+02:00 (CEST)
- Postal codes: 24238
- Dialling codes: 04383
- Vehicle registration: PLÖ
- Website: www.amt-selent- schlesen.de

Mucheln is a municipality in the district of Plön, in Schleswig-Holstein, Germany.
