= Nütschau Priory =

Monastery in Schleswig-Holstein, Germany

Coordinates: 53°49′21″N 10°19′36″E

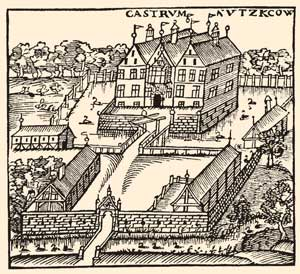
Nütschau manor house (woodcut)

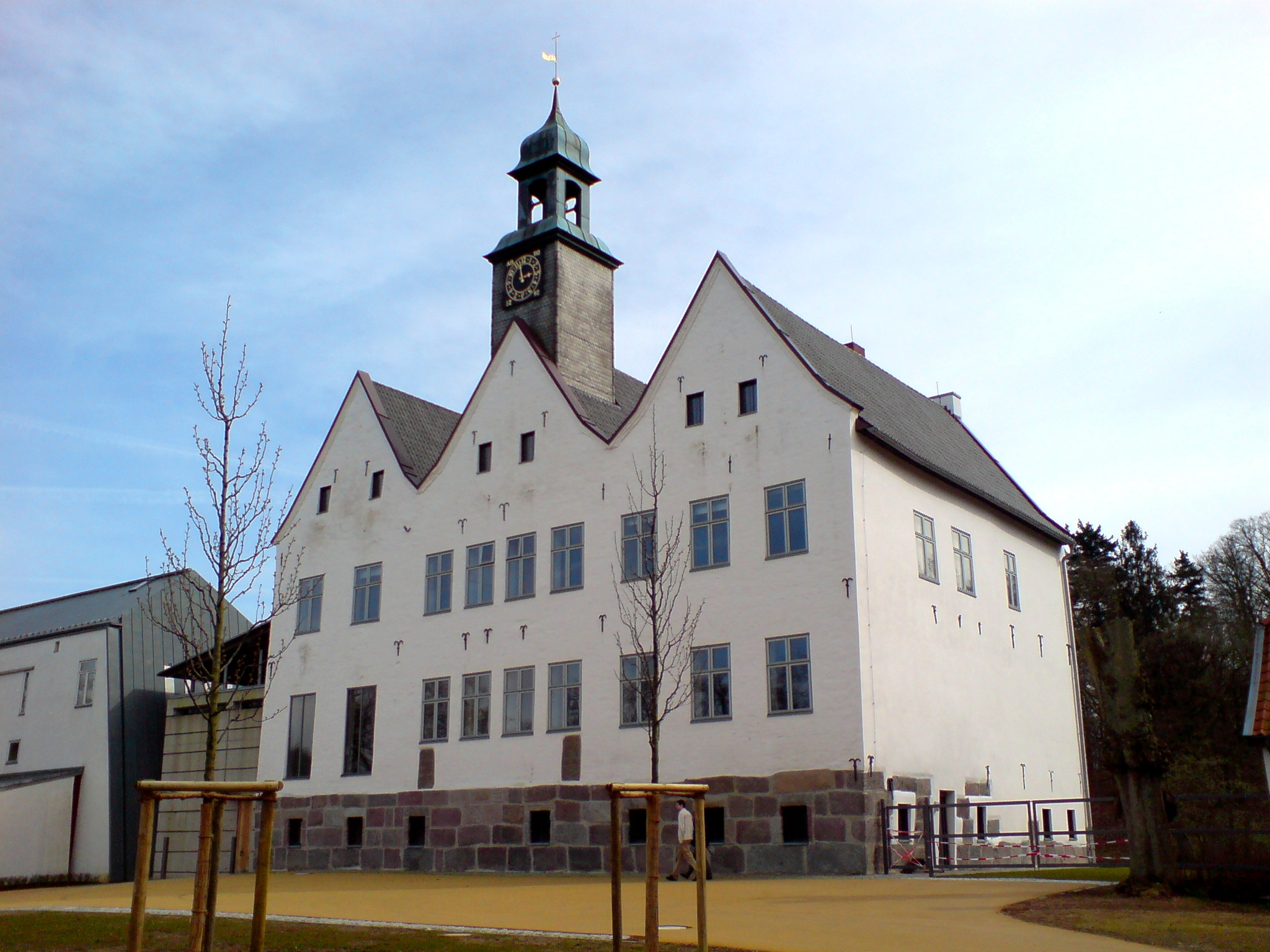
St Ansgar's Priory in 2008

Nütschau Priory, now St Ansgar's Priory (German: Kloster Nütschau or Priorat Sankt Ansgar) is a monastery of the Benedictine Order located at Travenbrück near Bad Oldesloe, Stormarn, Schleswig-Holstein in Germany. It is the northernmost Benedictine monastery in Germany.

== History ==
Around 830 a castle was built on the Trave, surrounded and secured with an earth wall: the Nütschauer Schanze, part of a Carolingian fortification. In 1577 Heinrich Rantzau built the small moated castle, the "Castrum Nutzkow". A turret was added to the central gable in 1792.

The Benedictine monastery originated after World War II as a refuge for displaced persons, particularly Catholics from the former German territories. The church acquired the former Nütschau manor house (Herrenhaus Nütschau) in 1951 and at the request of Hermann Wilhelm Berning, the Bishop of Osnabrück, it was developed by and staffed from Gerleve Abbey. St Ansgar's House (Haus Sankt Ansgar) opened in 1954, initially as a retreat house. In November 1960 the community was raised to the status of a priory under Gerleve. In 1965, Bishop Helmut Herrmann Wittler donated an Ansgar reliquary to the monastery at Nütschau. The priory church of St Ansgar was built in 1974, and in 1975 Nütschau became an independent monastery, which now includes a training house and a youth house.

Guided tours through the grounds and the manor house are available by appointment. The monks offer pilgrims on the "Way of St. James" and on the "Monk's Path" shelter for the night.

As of 2022, there were nineteen monks in residence. The priory is part of the Beuronese Congregation.

=== Priors ===
Under direct control of the Abbot of Gerleve:

1951-60 Pius Buddenborg

Priory of Gerleve Abbey

1960-71 Amandus Eilermann
1971-75 Gaudentius Sauermann

Independent priory

1975-94 Gaudentius Sauermann
1994 Antonius Terstiege
From 1994 Leo Overmeyer
