= Selent/Schlesen =

- Amt
- Flag Coat of arms

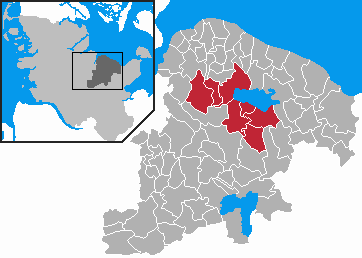
- Map of Plön highlighting Selent/Schlesen
- Interactive map of Selent/Schlesen
- Location within Germany Location within Schleswig-Holstein
- Coordinates: 54°18′N 10°26′E
- Country: Germany
- State: Schleswig-Holstein
- District: Plön
- Seat: Selent
- Subdivisions: 7 municipalities

Government
  - Mayor: Ulrike Raabe (CDU)

Area
  - Total: 117.54 km^{2} (45.38 sq mi)

Population (2025-12-31)
  - Total: 5,886
  - Density: 50.08/km^{2} (129.7/sq mi)
- Time zone: UTC+01:00 (CET)
  - Summer (DST): UTC+02:00 (CEST)
- Website: www.amt-selent-schlesen.de

Selent/Schlesen is an Amt ("collective municipality") in the district of Plön, in Schleswig-Holstein, Germany. It is situated approximately 17 km north of Plön, and 17 km east of Kiel. Its seat is in Selent.

== Subdivision ==
The Amt Selent/Schlesen consists of the following municipalities:

1. Dobersdorf
2. Fargau-Pratjau
3. Lammershagen
4. Martensrade
5. Mucheln
6. Schlesen
7. Selent
