= Krummbek Manor =

- Herrenhaus Krummbek
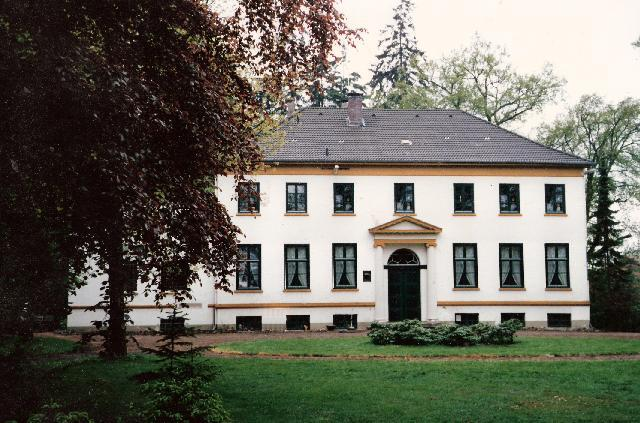
- Front elevation (c1993)

- Shown within Schleswig-Holstein Krummbek Manor (Germany)

General information
- Type: Manor house German: Herrenhaus
- Architectural style: Neoclassical
- Location: municipality of Lasbek, Gut Krummbek 3; 23847 Lasbek
- Coordinates: 53.7508°N 10.3941°E
- Construction started: 1803
- Client: Baron Ludwig Carl Christoph von Liliencron
- Owner: Private

Design and construction
- Architect: Christian Frederik Hansen

Krummbek Manor (German: Herrenhaus Krummbek) is a manor house in the municipality of Lasbek. It is a listed historical monument.

== History ==
In the late Middle Ages Krummbek, for the first time documented in 1327, was a farming village belonging to the abbey of Reinfeld. Later it was affiliated as a Meierhof to Schulenburg Manor (Gut Schulenburg). As such it was owned by the famous Marshal of France Count Nicolas Luckner (1722–1794), the great-grandfather of the not less famous navy officer and war hero Count Felix Luckner. When Count Nicolas Luckner was beheaded at the age of 72 during the Reign of Terror under the guillotine in Paris, Schulenburg manor including Krummbek passed to his son. Krummbek as an autonomous manor was created when count Luckner split it in 1803 from Schulenburg Manor. Its first owner was Baron Ludwig Carl Christoph von Liliencron (1777–1846), married to Countess Juliane von Luckner (1788–1863), who was an officer in the Napoleonic Wars. He had the manor house in 1803 erected by Christian Frederik Hansen in the neoclassical style. Later Krummbek came into the ownership of Hamburg merchants, thereunder Robert Jauch (1856–1909) of the Jauch family. In 1885, when he was Lord of Krummbek it had 67 inhabitants. Both his son the Freikorps leader and the German revolution Colonel Hans Jauch (1883–1965) and his daughter Luise Jauch (1885–1933) grew up at Krummbek. Luise Jauch was head nurse at The Magic Mountain at Davos, the second famous novel of Thomas Mann, when his wife Katia Mann stayed there in 1912. Luise Jauch's traits were utilized by Mann for the novel's head nurse Adritacia von Mylendonk. In 1909, Krummbek was bought by the Lampe family.

In 1928, Krummbek was incorporated into the village of Barkhorst and in 1974 it became a district of the municipality of Lasbek.

== Sources ==
- Hubertus Neuschäffer, Schlösser und Herrenhäuser in Südholstein: ein Handbuch, 1984

== See also ==
- List of castles in Schleswig-Holstein
