= Hohenfelde, Plön =

Hohenfelde
- Municipality
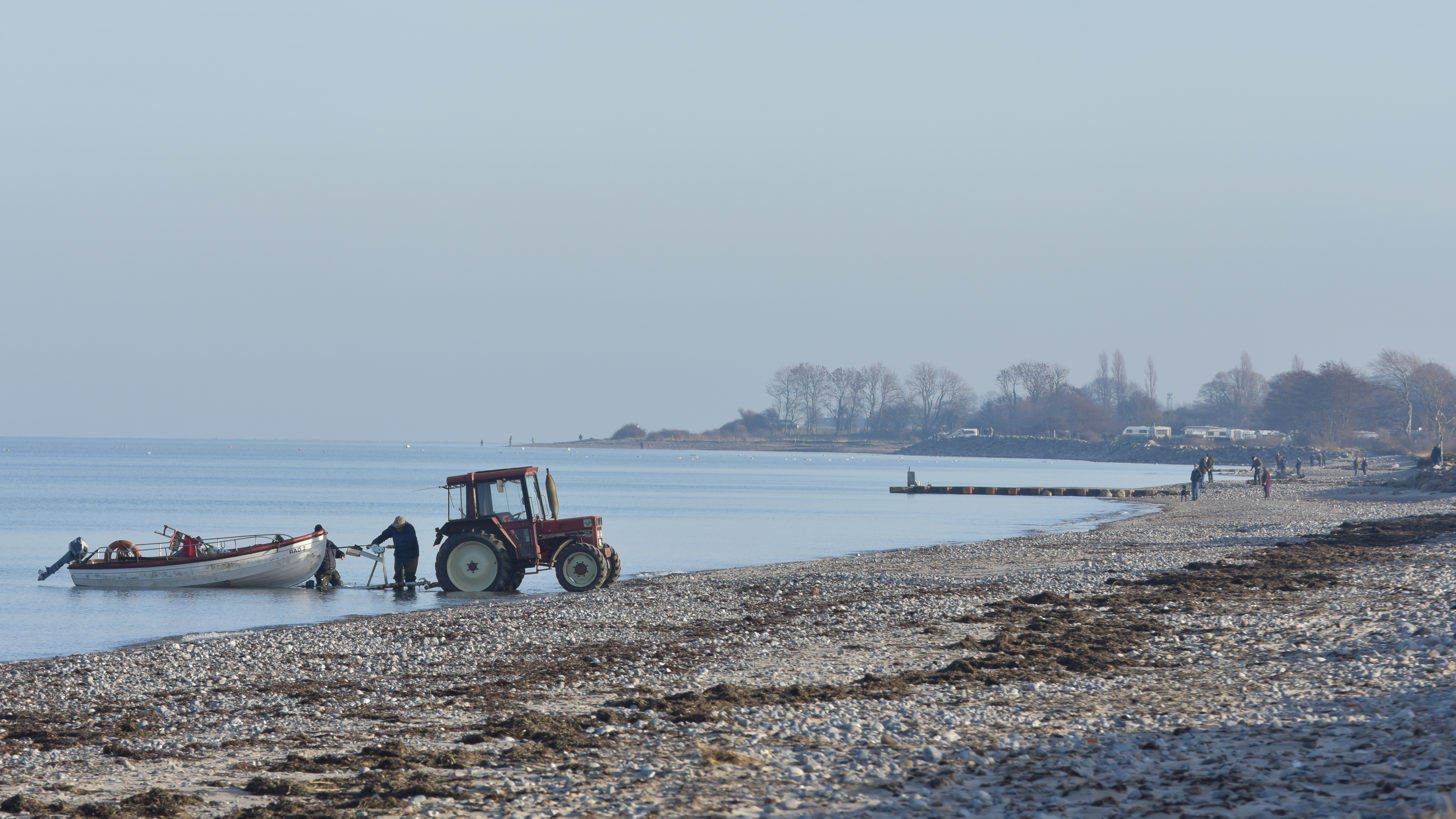
- Baltic Sea coast by Hohenfelde

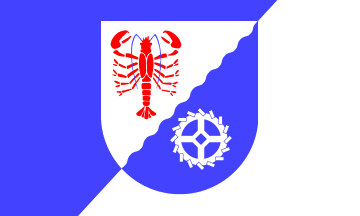
- Flag Coat of arms

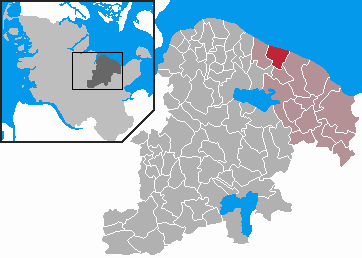
- Location of Hohenfelde within Plön district
- Interactive map of Hohenfelde
- Location within Germany Location within Schleswig-Holstein
- Coordinates: 54°22′N 10°30′E
- Country: Germany
- State: Schleswig-Holstein
- District: Plön
- Municipal assoc.: Lütjenburg

Government
  - Mayor: Gesa Fink

Area
  - Total: 10.54 km^{2} (4.07 sq mi)
- Elevation: 39 m (128 ft)

Population (2025-12-31)
  - Total: 1,051
  - Density: 99.72/km^{2} (258.3/sq mi)
- Time zone: UTC+01:00 (CET)
  - Summer (DST): UTC+02:00 (CEST)
- Postal codes: 24257
- Dialling codes: 04385
- Vehicle registration: PLÖ

Hohenfelde (German pronunciation: [hoːənˈfɛldə]) is a municipality in the district of Plön, in Schleswig-Holstein, Germany.
