= Selent =

- Municipality
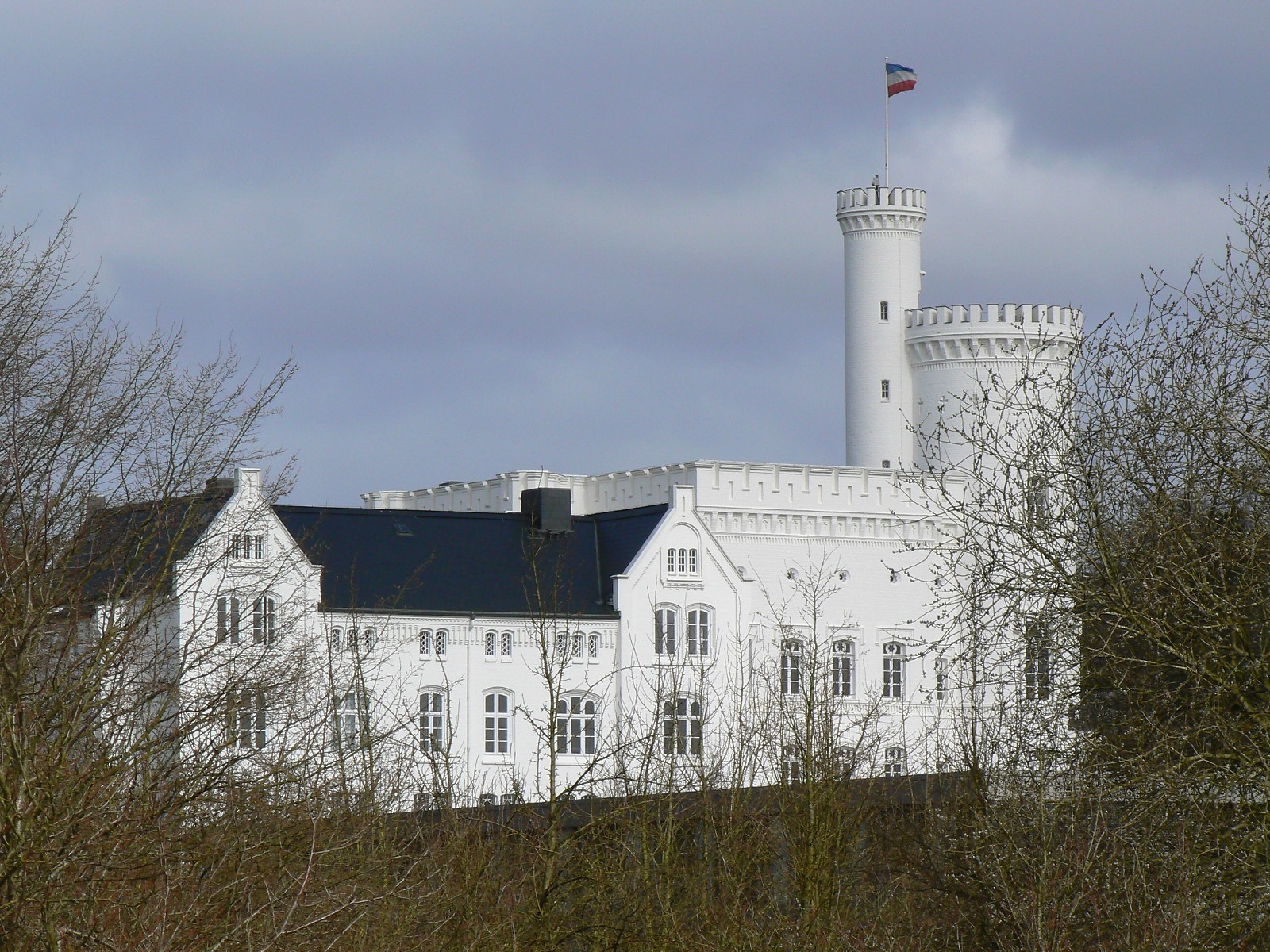
- Blomenburg in Selent

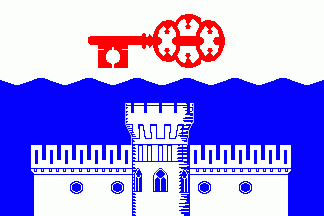
- Flag Coat of arms

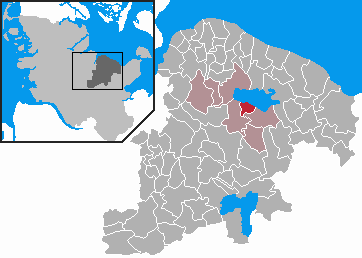
- Location of Selent within Plön district
- Interactive map of Selent
- Location within Germany Location within Schleswig-Holstein
- Coordinates: 54°17′30″N 10°25′42″E
- Country: Germany
- State: Schleswig-Holstein
- District: Plön
- Municipal assoc.: Selent/Schlesen

Government
  - Mayor: Sabine Tenambergen

Area
  - Total: 4.33 km^{2} (1.67 sq mi)
- Elevation: 51 m (167 ft)

Population (2025-12-31)
  - Total: 1,731
  - Density: 400/km^{2} (1,040/sq mi)
- Time zone: UTC+01:00 (CET)
  - Summer (DST): UTC+02:00 (CEST)
- Postal codes: 24238
- Dialling codes: 04384
- Vehicle registration: PLÖ
- Website: www.amt-selent- schlesen.de

Selent is a municipality in the district of Plön, in Schleswig-Holstein, Germany. It is situated at the southern bank of the Selenter See.
