= Dänischenhagen =

- Municipality
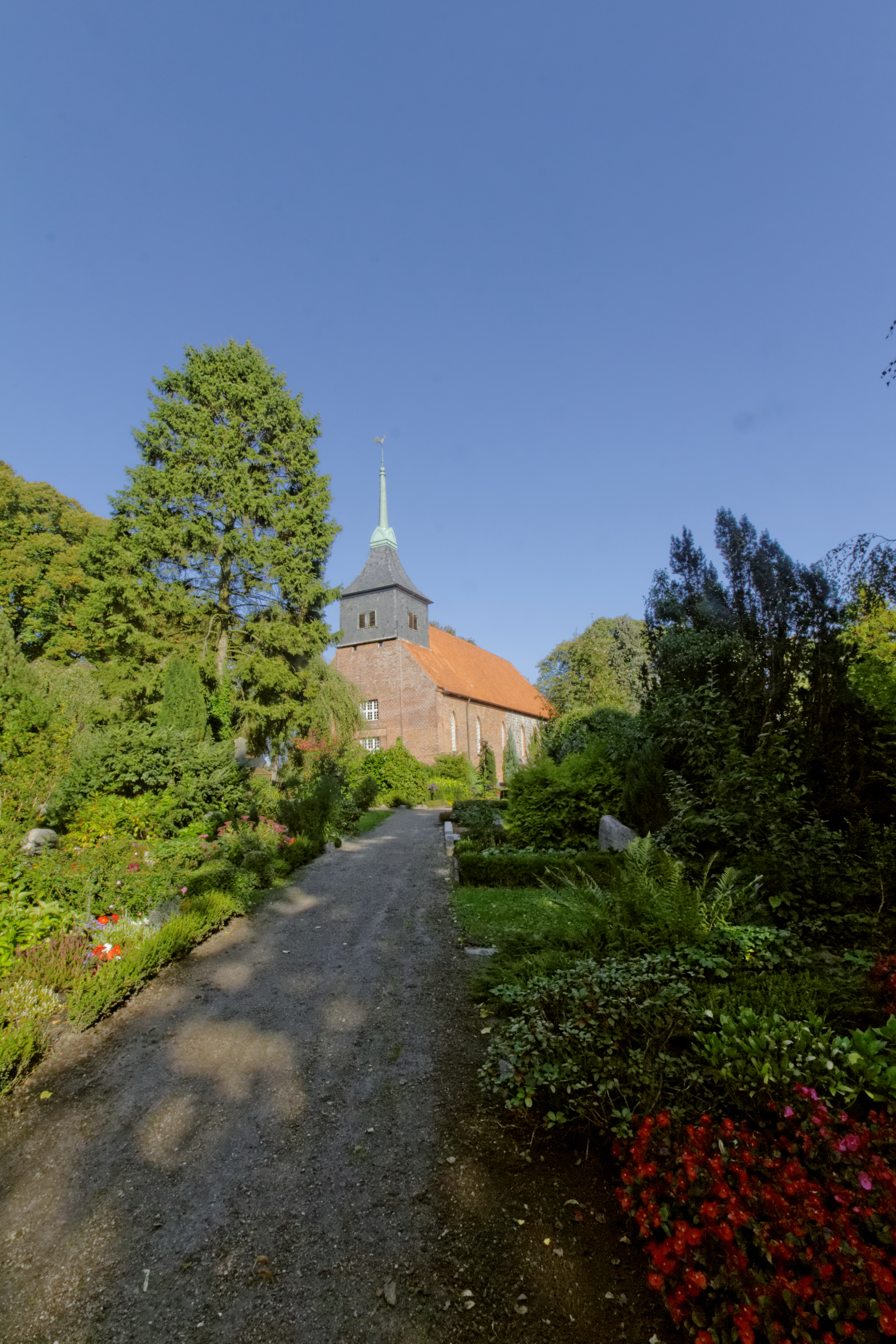

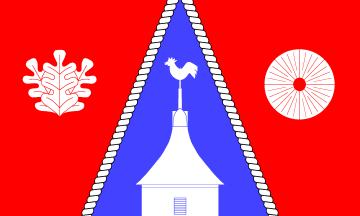
- Flag Coat of arms

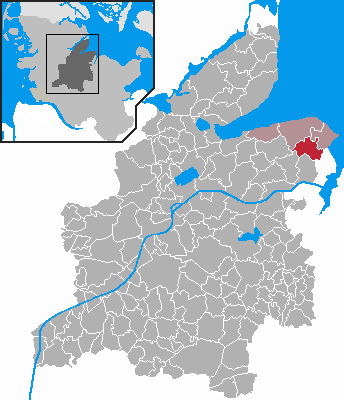
- Location of Dänischenhagen within Rendsburg-Eckernförde district
- Interactive map of Dänischenhagen
- Location within Germany Location within Schleswig-Holstein
- Coordinates: 54°26′N 10°8′E
- Country: Germany
- State: Schleswig-Holstein
- District: Rendsburg-Eckernförde
- Municipal assoc.: Dänischenhagen

Government
  - Mayor: Wolfgang Steffen (CDU)

Area
  - Total: 15.71 km^{2} (6.07 sq mi)
- Elevation: 6 m (20 ft)

Population (2025-12-31)
  - Total: 3,660
  - Density: 233/km^{2} (603/sq mi)
- Time zone: UTC+01:00 (CET)
  - Summer (DST): UTC+02:00 (CEST)
- Postal codes: 24229
- Dialling codes: 04349
- Vehicle registration: RD
- Website: www.amt-daenischenhagen.de

Dänischenhagen is a municipality in the district of Rendsburg-Eckernförde, in Schleswig-Holstein, Germany. It is situated near the Baltic Sea coast, approx. 11 km north of Kiel.

Dänischenhagen is the seat of the Amt ("collective municipality") Dänischenhagen.
