= Lammershagen =

- Municipality
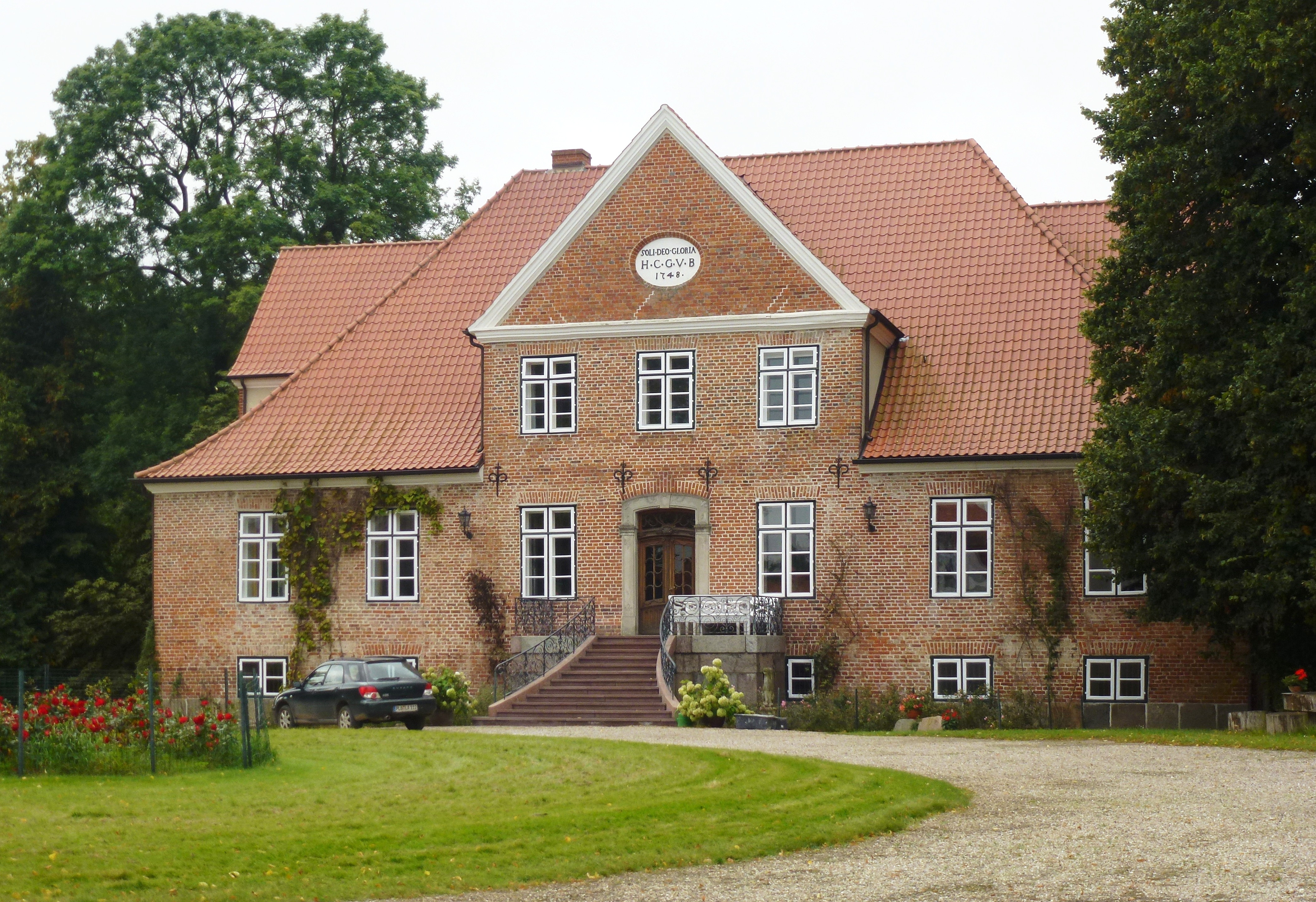
- Gut Lammershagen in Lammershagen

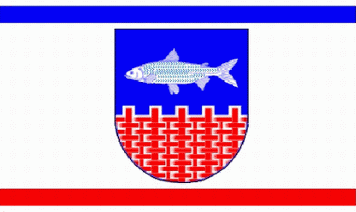
- Flag Coat of arms

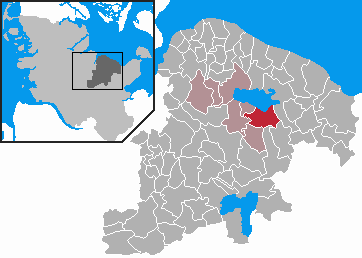
- Location of Lammershagen within Plön district
- Interactive map of Lammershagen
- Location within Germany Location within Schleswig-Holstein
- Coordinates: 54°16′N 10°26′E
- Country: Germany
- State: Schleswig-Holstein
- District: Plön
- Municipal assoc.: Selent/Schlesen

Government
  - Mayor: Rebekka Schmahlfuß (none)

Area
  - Total: 25.97 km^{2} (10.03 sq mi)
- Elevation: 49 m (161 ft)

Population (2025-12-31)
  - Total: 240
  - Density: 9.2/km^{2} (24/sq mi)
- Time zone: UTC+01:00 (CET)
  - Summer (DST): UTC+02:00 (CEST)
- Postal codes: 24238
- Dialling codes: 04384
- Vehicle registration: PLÖ
- Website: www.amt-selent-schlesen.de

Lammershagen is a municipality in the district of Plön, in Schleswig-Holstein, Germany.
