= Laurence de la Ferrière =

French climber, explorer and Antarctic specialist

Laurence de la Ferrière (born 1957) is a French mountaineer, explorer and writer. After breaking the woman's world record for altitude without oxygen on Mount Everest in 1992, in 1997 she became the first French woman to reach the South Pole alone, covering some 1,400 km (870 miles) in 57 days. More recently she has coordinated work at the French Antarctic station Dumont d'Urville.

== Biography ==
Born in Casablanca, Morocco, on 16 March 1957, de la Ferrière came from a well-established French family. Her great-grandfather had been a banker, her grandfather an engineer and her father a salesman for a brick company. In 1965, as a result of upsets in Morocco, she and her family moved to the Lyon region in France. On qualifying from secondary school, she went on an Alpine mountaineering course in Courmayeur where she met her husband, Bernard Muller a seasoned climber. Together they climbed some of the world's highest mountains.

In 1984, she broke the woman's record for altitude without oxygen on Nepal's Yalung Kang. After giving birth to two daughters, Céline and Charlotte, two years later she again broke the altitude record, climbing Mount Everest.

During the European winter of 1996–97, de la Ferrière became the first French woman to reach the South Pole unassisted, covering the distance from the Weddell Sea to the Amundsen-Scott base at temperatures around -40 C while dragging a 150 kg (310 lb) sledge behind her. It was the moment she had always waited for. In her own words:

It's as if you have infinity in front of you, the infinitely large, the infinitely beautiful, the infinitely white, infinite freedom. For me, it's the greatest sense of freedom a human being can experience. As I walked along, I would turn around, look at my tracks, they were endless, it was wonderful.

De la Ferrière returned to Antarctica in 2009, this time to head the French Dumont d'Urville Station for a period of 15 months. With a team of 25 scientists and technicians, of whom a third were women, the objective was to measure the thickness of the ozone layer and analyse residues in the ice. In 2012, she coordinated renovation work at the Dumont d'Urville Station which had been built in the 1950s. No longer interested in feats of endurance or exploration, she now spends the remainder of her time lecturing in France and Europe, explaining how important it is to study the Antarctic in order to improve understanding of climate change.

== Publications ==
In early 2000, de la Ferrière published an account of her Antarctic experiences in Seule dans le vent des glaces (Alone in the glacial wind).
