= Bültsee =

Lake in Schleswig-Holstein, Germany

Bültsee (Dan. Bulsø)
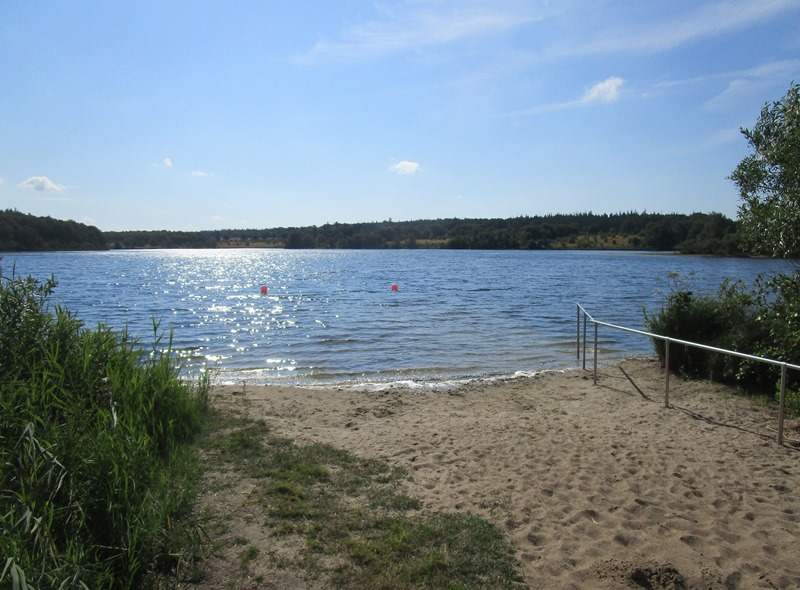
- A View of Bültsee Lake

- Location within Schleswig-Holstein
- Location: Rendsburg-Eckernförde, Schleswig-Holstein
- Coordinates: 54°29′44″N 9°45′15.65″E
- Basin countries: Germany
- Surface area: 20.10 ha (49.7 acres)
- Max. depth: 13.40 m (43.96 ft)
- Surface elevation: 9.35 m (30.68 ft)

Bültsee (Danish: Bulsø) is a kettle lake in Rendsburg-Eckernförde, Schleswig-Holstein, Germany. At an elevation of 9.35 m (30.68 ft), its surface area is 0.078 square miles (20.10 ha). It was formed during the last glacial period (the Weichselian Ice Age).

The lake is fed exclusively by groundwater and has no inflow or outflow. On its western shore there is a public bathing area, located between Eckernförde and Fleckeby near the B 76 highway.

== Ecology and vegetation ==
The lake is classified as oligotrophic (nutrient-poor) and provides a habitat for plant species that occur only in such nutrient-poor waters, including water lobelia (Lobelia dortmanna), brazengrass (Isoetes lacustris), shoreweed (Littorella uniflora), and alternate water-milfoil (Myriophyllum alterniflorum). The lake's shores are also a breeding site for the little ringed plover.

== Conservation ==
Since 1982, the lake and its surrounding area have been protected as the nature reserve "Bültsee und Umgebung". As of 2019, the area is grazed by Galloway cattle belonging to the conservation organization Bunde Wischen e.V.

== Etymology ==
The name of the lake is first noted around 1600. The name derives from Old Danish bolt in the meaning round increase (cf. indoeuropean. *bhel≈to swell, to bubble, to be round).
