= Wittmoldt =

- Municipality
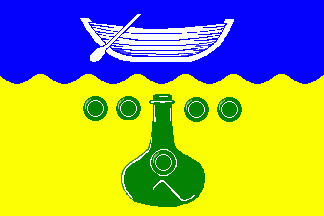
- Flag Coat of arms

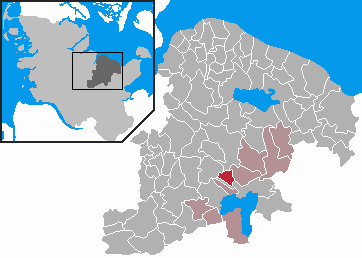
- Location of Wittmoldt within Plön district
- Interactive map of Wittmoldt
- Location within Germany Location within Schleswig-Holstein
- Coordinates: 54°10′N 10°22′E
- Country: Germany
- State: Schleswig-Holstein
- District: Plön
- Municipal assoc.: Großer Plöner See

Government
  - Mayor: Gerold Fahrenkrog

Area
  - Total: 5.71 km^{2} (2.20 sq mi)
- Elevation: 20 m (66 ft)

Population (2025-12-31)
  - Total: 167
  - Density: 29.2/km^{2} (75.7/sq mi)
- Time zone: UTC+01:00 (CET)
  - Summer (DST): UTC+02:00 (CEST)
- Postal codes: 24306
- Dialling codes: 04522
- Vehicle registration: PLÖ
- Website: www.amt-grosser- ploener-see.de

Wittmoldt is a municipality in the district of Plön, in Schleswig-Holstein, Germany.
