= Sprakebüll =

Sprakebüll Spragebøl / Språkebel
- Municipality
- Coat of arms

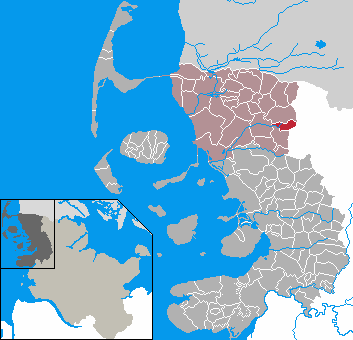
- Location of Sprakebüll; Spragebøl / Språkebel within Nordfriesland district
- Interactive map of Sprakebüll; Spragebøl / Språkebel
- Location within Germany Location within Schleswig-Holstein
- Coordinates: 54°46′N 9°4′E
- Country: Germany
- State: Schleswig-Holstein
- District: Nordfriesland
- Municipal assoc.: Südtondern

Government
  - Mayor: Karl-Richard Nissen

Area
  - Total: 11.37 km^{2} (4.39 sq mi)
- Elevation: 7 m (23 ft)

Population (2025-12-31)
  - Total: 293
  - Density: 25.8/km^{2} (66.7/sq mi)
- Time zone: UTC+01:00 (CET)
  - Summer (DST): UTC+02:00 (CEST)
- Postal codes: 25917
- Dialling codes: 04662
- Vehicle registration: NF
- Website: www.amt- karrharde.de

Sprakebüll (Danish: Spragebøl, North Frisian: Språkebel) is a municipality in the district of Nordfriesland, in Schleswig-Holstein, Germany.
