= Neukirchen, Ostholstein =

Neukirchen
- Municipality
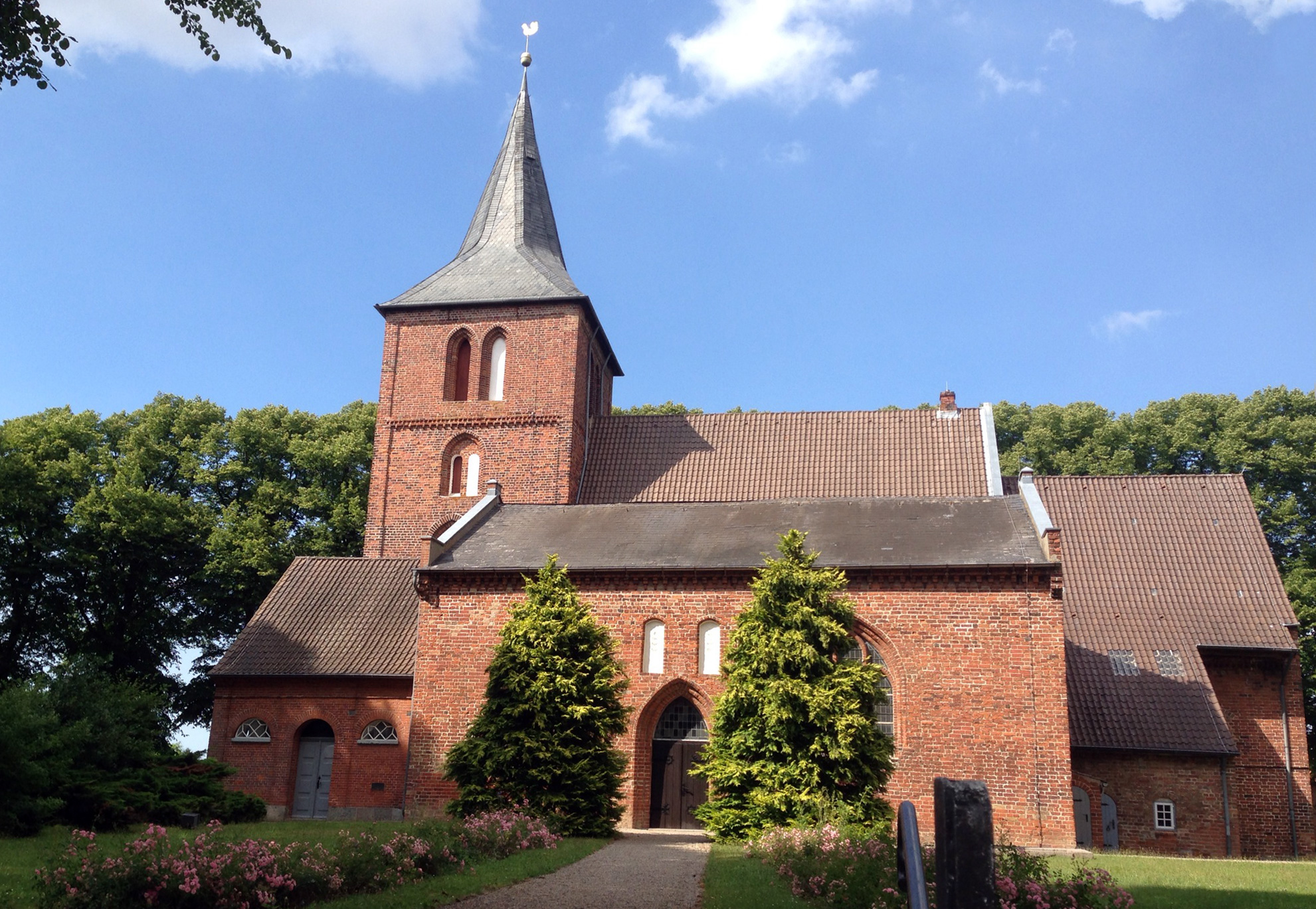
- Neunkirchen Church

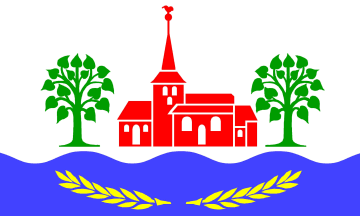
- Flag Coat of arms

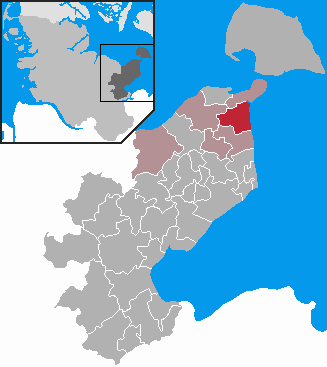
- Location of Neukirchen within Ostholstein district
- Interactive map of Neukirchen
- Location within Germany Location within Schleswig-Holstein
- Coordinates: 54°19′N 11°1′E
- Country: Germany
- State: Schleswig-Holstein
- District: Ostholstein
- Municipal assoc.: Oldenburg-Land

Government
  - Mayor: Jürgen Lübbe

Area
  - Total: 28.6 km^{2} (11.0 sq mi)
- Elevation: 11 m (36 ft)

Population (2025-12-31)
  - Total: 1,153
  - Density: 40.3/km^{2} (104/sq mi)
- Time zone: UTC+01:00 (CET)
  - Summer (DST): UTC+02:00 (CEST)
- Postal codes: 23779
- Dialling codes: 04365
- Vehicle registration: OH
- Website: www.amt-oldenburg- land.de

Neukirchen (German pronunciation: [nɔʏˈkɪʁçn̩]) is a municipality in the district of Ostholstein, in Schleswig-Holstein, Germany. It is next to the Baltic Sea.
