= Travenbrück =

- Municipality
- Coat of arms

- Location of Travenbrück within Stormarn district
- Interactive map of Travenbrück
- Location within Germany Location within Schleswig-Holstein
- Coordinates: 53°51′N 10°20′E
- Country: Germany
- State: Schleswig-Holstein
- District: Stormarn
- Municipal assoc.: Bad Oldesloe-Land

Government
  - Mayor: Peter Lengfeld

Area
  - Total: 26.47 km^{2} (10.22 sq mi)
- Elevation: 31 m (102 ft)

Population (2025-12-31)
  - Total: 1,802
  - Density: 68.08/km^{2} (176.3/sq mi)
- Time zone: UTC+01:00 (CET)
  - Summer (DST): UTC+02:00 (CEST)
- Postal codes: 23843
- Dialling codes: 04531
- Vehicle registration: OD
- Website: www.amt-bad- oldesloe-land.de

Travenbrück (West Low German: Travenbrüch) is a municipality in the district of Stormarn, in Schleswig-Holstein, Germany. The towns of Neverstaven, Nütschau, Schlamersdorf, Sühlen, Tralau and Vinzier are in the municipality.

== History ==
The municipality was created on 1 January 1978 through the merging of two former municipalities, Tralau and Travenburg.

== Politics ==
Of the fourteen seats in the municipal council, the Free Voter party AWGT has held seven seats since the local elections on 26 May 2013, the CDU four seats and the SPD three seats. The voter turnout was approximately 59%. The current mayor is Peter Lengfeld.

=== Coat of arms ===
The blazon of the coat of arms of the municipality is as follows:

Per bend sinister Gules and Azure, a bend sinister wavy Argent. In chief the facade of Nütschau Priory Argent, over all a bridge Argent.

The wavy ordinary in the coat of arms depicts the Trave, which separates the districts. The bridge connects the districts literally, and symbolically. The Nütschau Priory, a former manor of Heinrich Rantzau, is an outstanding feature of the municipality.

== Economy and Infrastructure ==
=== Transportation ===
Tralau lies directly on Bundesautobahn 21, which cuts north-south through the municipality.

== Districts ==
Tralau lies in the middle of the municipality, to the northeast Sühlen, the east Schlamersdorf, southeast Nütschau, the south Vinzier, and west Neverstaven. Schlamersdorf and Sühlen are located east of the highway.

== Culture and Attractions ==
The Nütschau Priory, previously a manor house owned by Heinrich Rantzau, is located in the district of Nütschau.

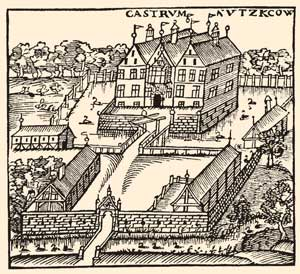
Nütschau manor (woodcut)

A mansion built in 1894 by Alexander Jenisch, combines Renaissance Revival architecture with Art Nouveau.
