= Heiligenstedten =

- Municipality
- Coat of arms

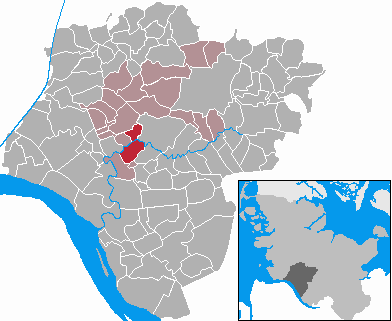
- Location of Heiligenstedten within Steinburg district
- Interactive map of Heiligenstedten
- Location within Germany Location within Schleswig-Holstein
- Coordinates: 53°56′N 9°28′E
- Country: Germany
- State: Schleswig-Holstein
- District: Steinburg
- Municipal assoc.: Itzehoe-Land

Government
  - Mayor: Peter Rakowski-Dammann

Area
  - Total: 8.96 km^{2} (3.46 sq mi)
- Elevation: 4 m (13 ft)

Population (2025-12-31)
  - Total: 1,484
  - Density: 166/km^{2} (429/sq mi)
- Time zone: UTC+01:00 (CET)
  - Summer (DST): UTC+02:00 (CEST)
- Postal codes: 25524
- Dialling codes: 04821
- Vehicle registration: IZ
- Website: www.amtitzehoe- land.de

Heiligenstedten is a municipality in the district of Steinburg, in Schleswig-Holstein, Germany.
