= Altenkrempe =

- Municipality
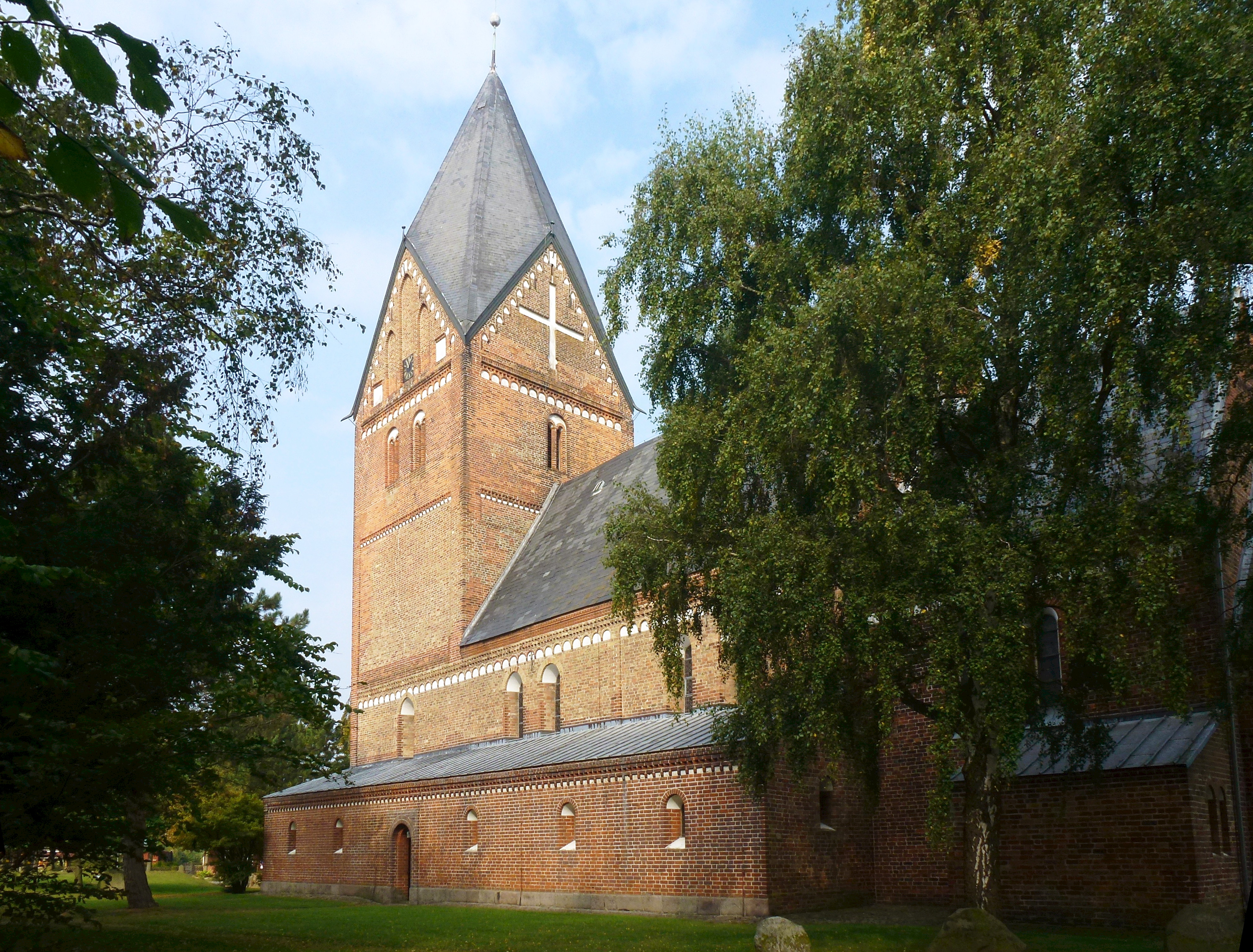
- Basilica of Altenkrempe

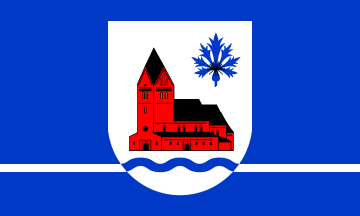
- Flag Coat of arms

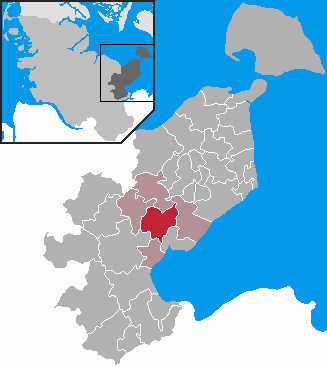
- Location of Altenkrempe within Ostholstein district
- Interactive map of Altenkrempe
- Location within Germany Location within Schleswig-Holstein
- Coordinates: 54°08′00″N 10°49′34″E
- Country: Germany
- State: Schleswig-Holstein
- District: Ostholstein
- Municipal assoc.: Ostholstein-Mitte

Government
  - Mayor: Klaus Weidemann

Area
  - Total: 36.64 km^{2} (14.15 sq mi)
- Elevation: 3 m (9.8 ft)

Population (2025-12-31)
  - Total: 1,078
  - Density: 29.42/km^{2} (76.20/sq mi)
- Time zone: UTC+01:00 (CET)
  - Summer (DST): UTC+02:00 (CEST)
- Postal codes: 23730
- Dialling codes: 04561
- Vehicle registration: OH
- Website: www.amt-ostholstein-mitte.de

Altenkrempe is a municipality in the district of Ostholstein, in Schleswig-Holstein, Germany.
