= Kletkamp =

- Municipality
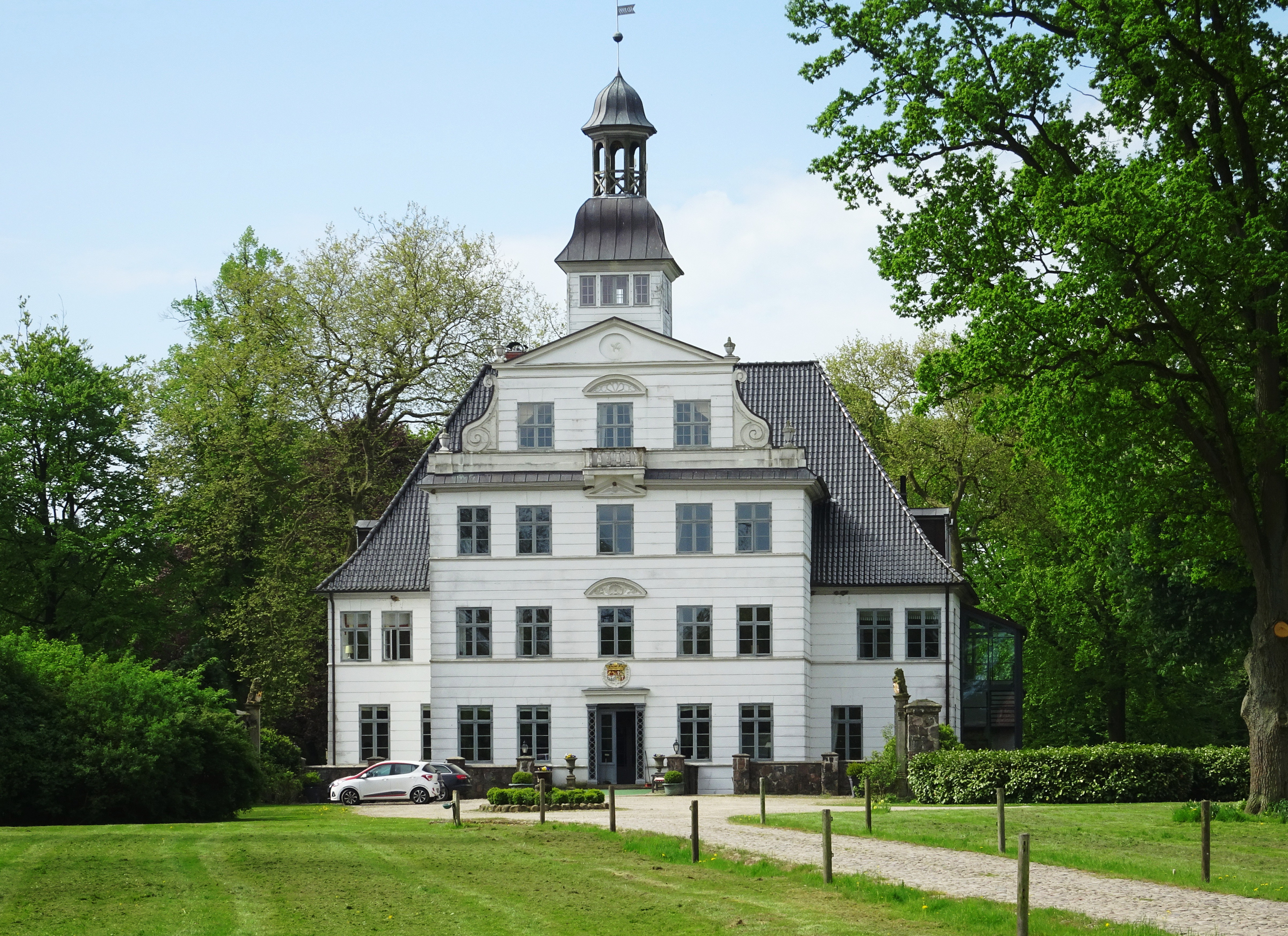
- Kletkamp Manor

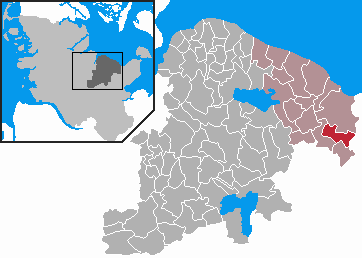
- Location of Kletkamp within Plön district
- Interactive map of Kletkamp
- Location within Germany Location within Schleswig-Holstein
- Coordinates: 54°15′N 10°37′E
- Country: Germany
- State: Schleswig-Holstein
- District: Plön
- Municipal assoc.: Lütjenburg

Government
  - Mayor: Bertram Graf v. Brockdorff

Area
  - Total: 11.52 km^{2} (4.45 sq mi)
- Elevation: 51 m (167 ft)

Population (2025-12-31)
  - Total: 110
  - Density: 9.5/km^{2} (25/sq mi)
- Time zone: UTC+01:00 (CET)
  - Summer (DST): UTC+02:00 (CEST)
- Postal codes: 24327
- Dialling codes: 04381
- Vehicle registration: PLÖ

Kletkamp is a municipality in the district of Plön, in Schleswig-Holstein, Germany.
