= Strande =

- Municipality
- Flag Coat of arms

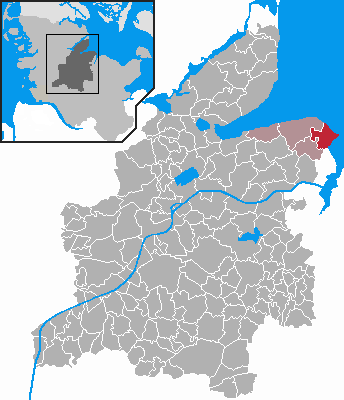
- Location of Strande within Rendsburg-Eckernförde district
- Interactive map of Strande
- Location within Germany Location within Schleswig-Holstein
- Coordinates: 54°26′N 10°10′E
- Country: Germany
- State: Schleswig-Holstein
- District: Rendsburg-Eckernförde
- Municipal assoc.: Dänischenhagen

Government
  - Mayor: Holger Klink

Area
  - Total: 13.73 km^{2} (5.30 sq mi)
- Elevation: 4 m (13 ft)

Population (2025-12-31)
  - Total: 1,421
  - Density: 103.5/km^{2} (268.1/sq mi)
- Time zone: UTC+01:00 (CET)
  - Summer (DST): UTC+02:00 (CEST)
- Postal codes: 24229
- Dialling codes: 04308, 04349
- Vehicle registration: RD
- Website: www.amt-daenischenhagen.de

Strande is a municipality in the district of Rendsburg-Eckernförde, in Schleswig-Holstein, Germany at the Kiel Fjord.
