= Kleve, Steinburg =

Kleve
- Municipality
- Coat of arms

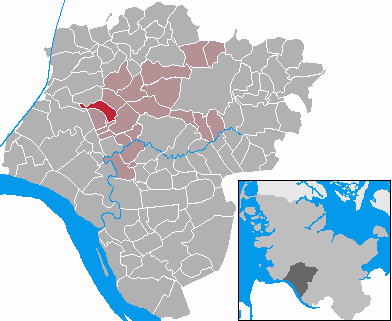
- Location of Kleve within Steinburg district
- Interactive map of Kleve
- Location within Germany Location within Schleswig-Holstein
- Coordinates: 53°57′53″N 9°24′27″E
- Country: Germany
- State: Schleswig-Holstein
- District: Steinburg
- Municipal assoc.: Itzehoe-Land
- Subdivisions: 2

Government
  - Mayor: Werner Matthießen

Area
  - Total: 5.57 km^{2} (2.15 sq mi)
- Elevation: 8 m (26 ft)

Population (2025-12-31)
  - Total: 538
  - Density: 96.6/km^{2} (250/sq mi)
- Time zone: UTC+01:00 (CET)
  - Summer (DST): UTC+02:00 (CEST)
- Postal codes: 25554
- Dialling codes: 04823
- Vehicle registration: IZ
- Website: www.amtitzehoe- land.de

Kleve (German pronunciation: [ˈkleːvə]) is a municipality in the district of Steinburg, in Schleswig-Holstein, Germany.
