= Dobersdorf =

- Municipality
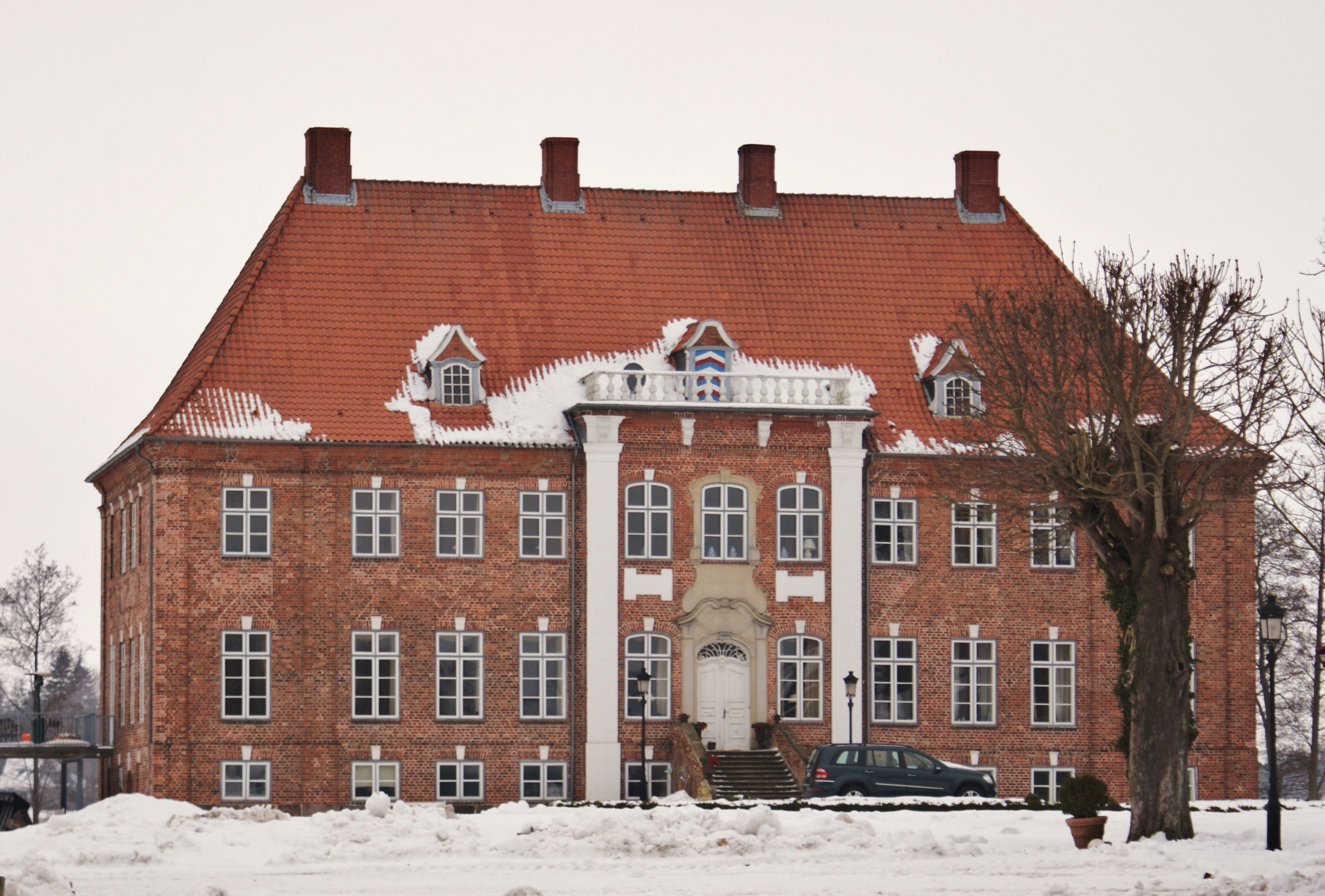
- Gut Dobersdorf in Dobersdorf

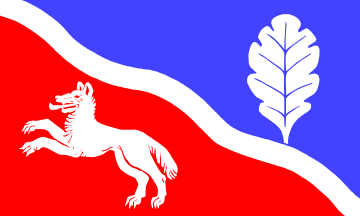
- Flag Coat of arms

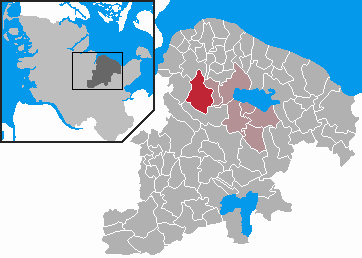
- Location of Dobersdorf within Plön district
- Interactive map of Dobersdorf
- Location within Germany Location within Schleswig-Holstein
- Coordinates: 54°19′N 10°16′E
- Country: Germany
- State: Schleswig-Holstein
- District: Plön
- Municipal assoc.: Selent/Schlesen

Government
  - Mayor: Gabriele Kalinka (CDU)

Area
  - Total: 21.91 km^{2} (8.46 sq mi)
- Elevation: 25 m (82 ft)

Population (2025-12-31)
  - Total: 1,094
  - Density: 49.93/km^{2} (129.3/sq mi)
- Time zone: UTC+01:00 (CET)
  - Summer (DST): UTC+02:00 (CEST)
- Postal codes: 24232
- Dialling codes: 04348/04303
- Vehicle registration: PLÖ
- Website: www.amt-selent- schlesen.de

Dobersdorf is a municipality in the district of Plön, in Schleswig-Holstein, Germany.
