= Charles Grangier de la Ferrière =

French military officer (1738–1794)

Charles Grangier de la Ferrière (21 September 1738, Pontchâteau – 8 March 1794, Paris) was a French general of the War of the First Coalition.

== Life ==
He entered the French army on 12 April 1756, joining a gendarme regiment before moving to the line infantry in 1758. On 5 February 1792 he was made colonel of the 23rd Infantry Regiment. On 28 April 1792 he was général Custine's second-in-command in the capture of Porrentruy.

He was promoted to brigade-general in the Army of the Alps on 15 May 1793, but was sacked on 7 October 1793 and arrested on 29 October the same year at Mende.

He was transported to Paris and condemned to execution by the revolutionary tribunal. He was guillotined on 8 March 1794.
