= Schwedeneck =

- Municipality
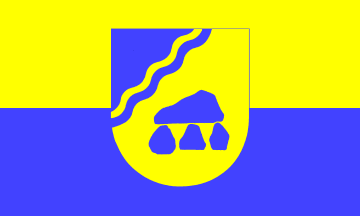
- Flag Coat of arms

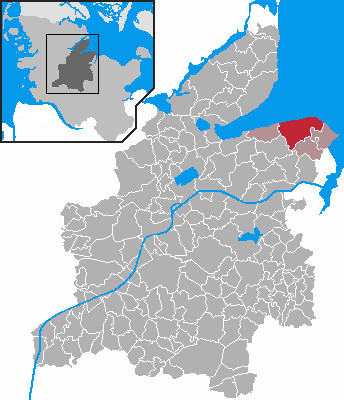
- Location of Schwedeneck within Rendsburg-Eckernförde district
- Interactive map of Schwedeneck
- Location within Germany Location within Schleswig-Holstein
- Coordinates: 54°28′17″N 10°4′36″E
- Country: Germany
- State: Schleswig-Holstein
- District: Rendsburg-Eckernförde
- Municipal assoc.: Dänischenhagen

Government
  - Mayor: Sönke-Peter Paulsen (CDU)

Area
  - Total: 28.54 km^{2} (11.02 sq mi)
- Elevation: 31 m (102 ft)

Population (2025-12-31)
  - Total: 2,860
  - Density: 100/km^{2} (260/sq mi)
- Time zone: UTC+01:00 (CET)
  - Summer (DST): UTC+02:00 (CEST)
- Postal codes: 24229
- Dialling codes: 04308
- Vehicle registration: RD
- Website: www.amt- daenischenhagen.de

Schwedeneck is a municipality in the district of Rendsburg-Eckernförde, in Schleswig-Holstein, Germany.
