= Rieseby =

Rieseby Risby
- Municipality
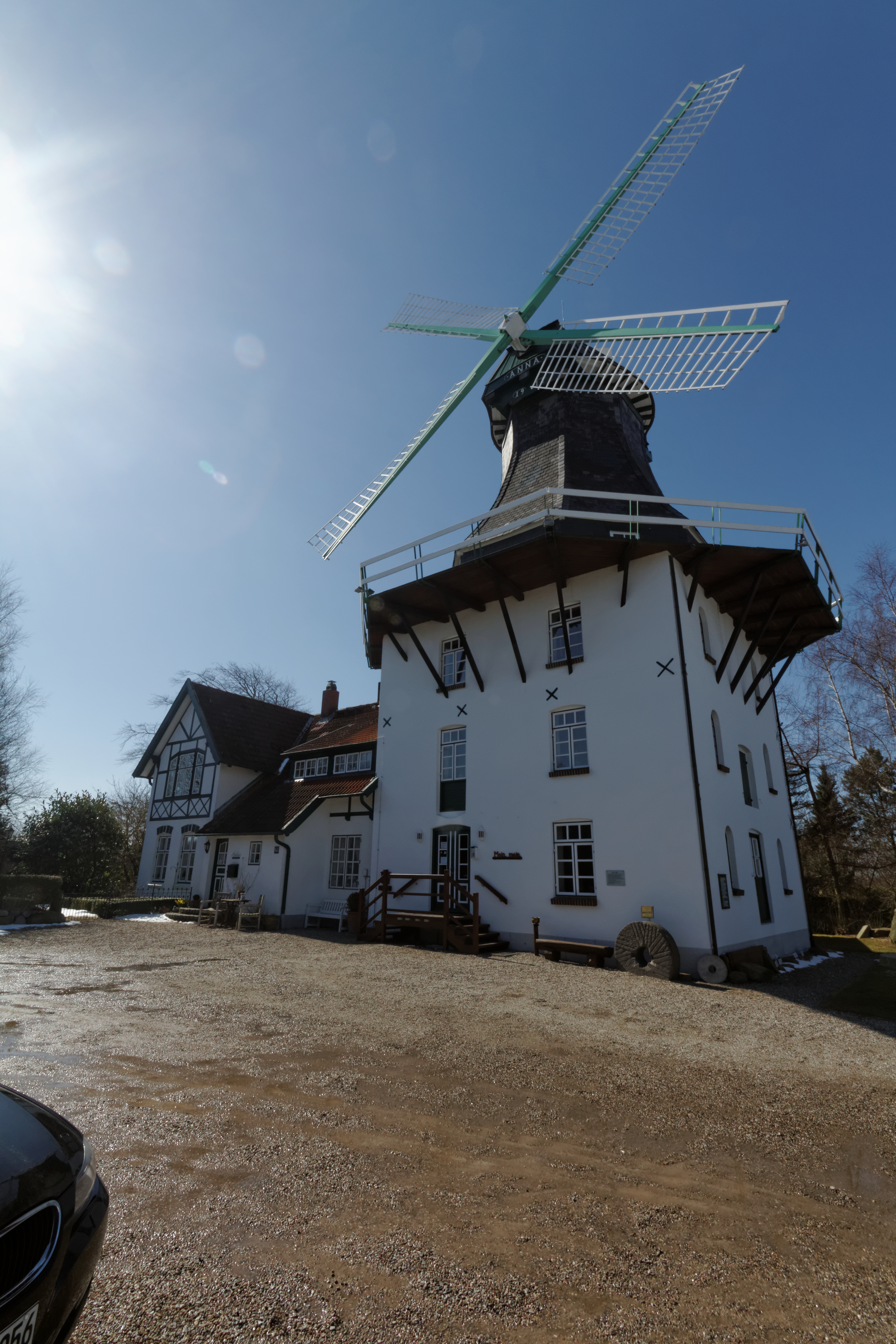

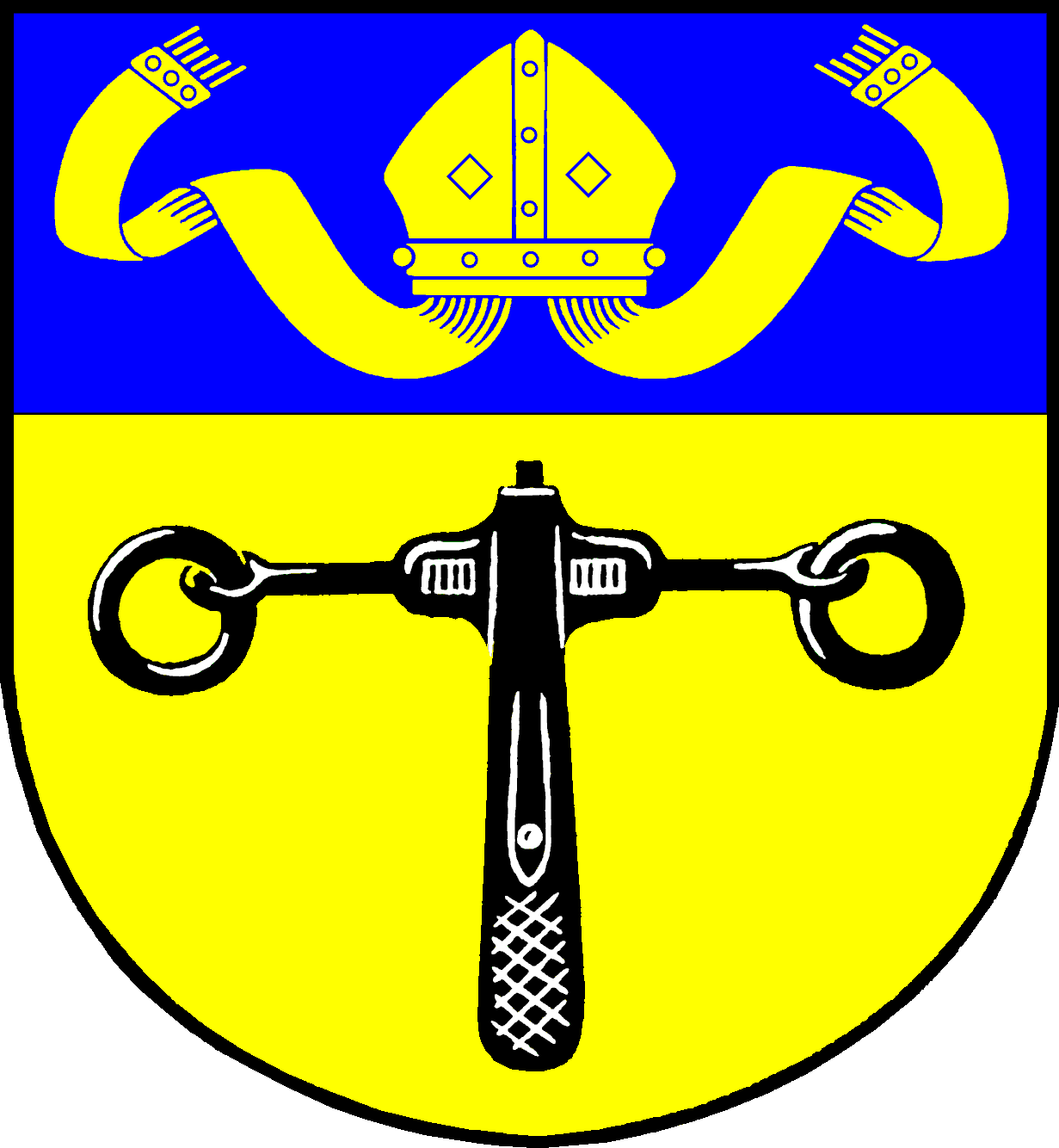
- Coat of arms

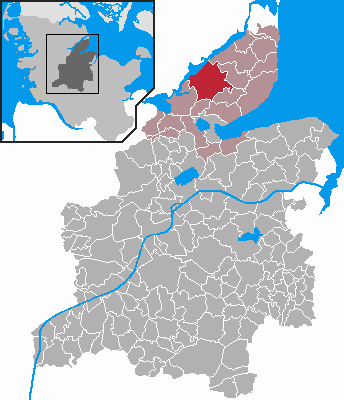
- Location of Rieseby; Risby within Rendsburg-Eckernförde district
- Interactive map of Rieseby; Risby
- Location within Germany Location within Schleswig-Holstein
- Coordinates: 54°32′40″N 9°49′20″E
- Country: Germany
- State: Schleswig-Holstein
- District: Rendsburg-Eckernförde
- Municipal assoc.: Schlei-Ostsee

Area
  - Total: 38.85 km^{2} (15.00 sq mi)
- Elevation: 30 m (98 ft)

Population (2025-12-31)
  - Total: 2,745
  - Density: 70.66/km^{2} (183.0/sq mi)
- Time zone: UTC+01:00 (CET)
  - Summer (DST): UTC+02:00 (CEST)
- Postal codes: 24354
- Dialling codes: 04355, 04358
- Vehicle registration: RD
- Website: www.amt-schlei- ostsee.de

Rieseby (Danish: Risby) is a municipality in the district of Rendsburg-Eckernförde, in Schleswig-Holstein, Germany.
