= Fargau-Pratjau =

- Municipality
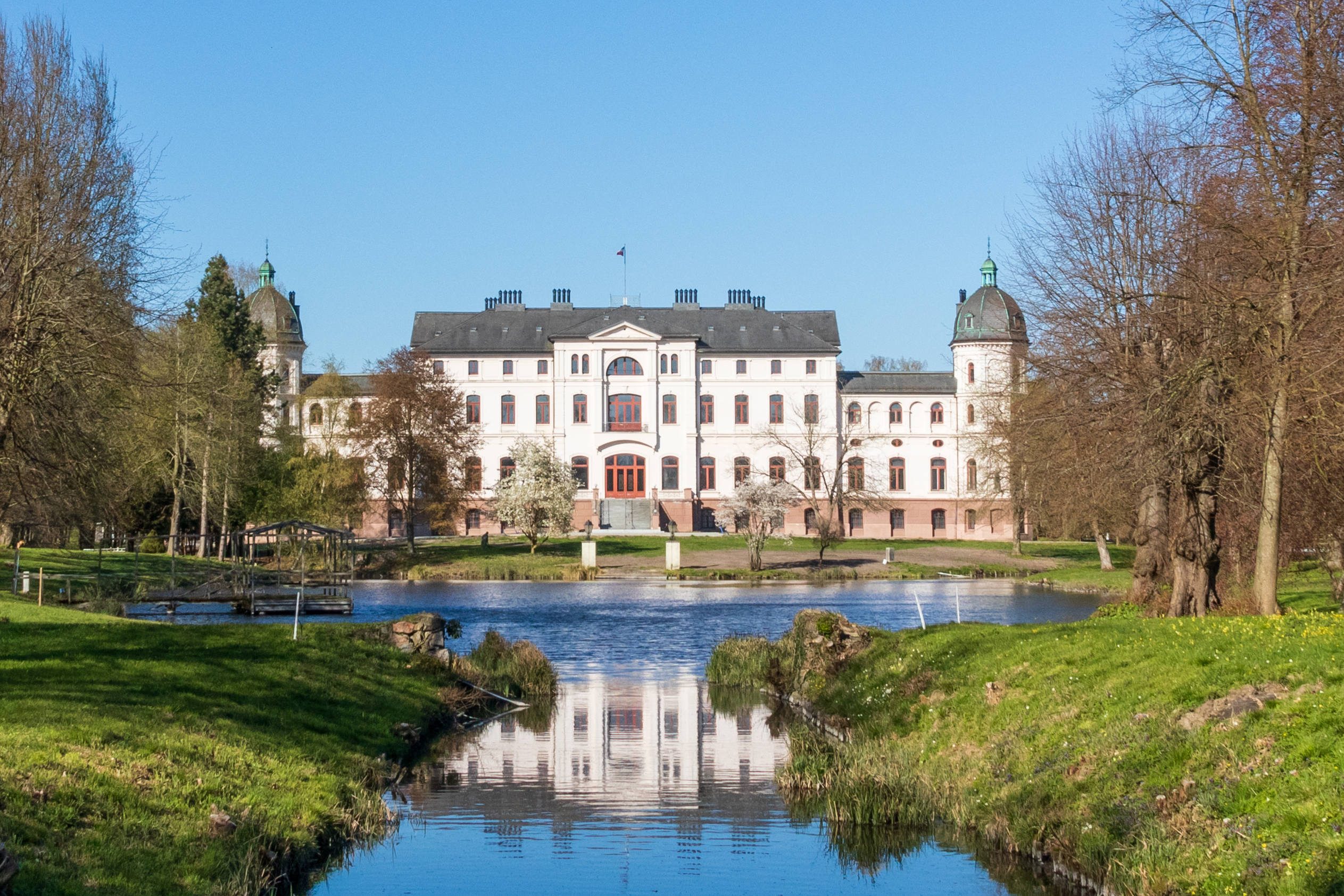
- Gut Salzau in Fargau-Pratjau

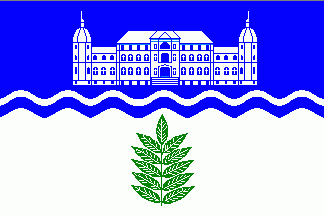
- Flag Coat of arms

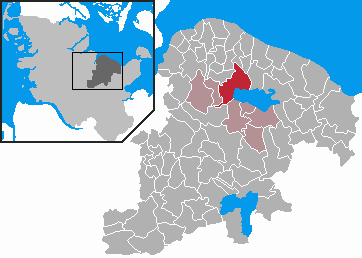
- Location of Fargau-Pratjau within Plön district
- Interactive map of Fargau-Pratjau
- Location within Germany Location within Schleswig-Holstein
- Coordinates: 54°20′3″N 10°24′58″E
- Country: Germany
- State: Schleswig-Holstein
- District: Plön
- Municipal assoc.: Selent/Schlesen

Government
  - Mayor: Hans-Joachim Lütt

Area
  - Total: 23.53 km^{2} (9.08 sq mi)
- Elevation: 41 m (135 ft)

Population (2025-12-31)
  - Total: 745
  - Density: 31.7/km^{2} (82.0/sq mi)
- Time zone: UTC+01:00 (CET)
  - Summer (DST): UTC+02:00 (CEST)
- Postal codes: 24256
- Dialling codes: 04303
- Vehicle registration: PLÖ
- Website: www.amt-selent- schlesen.de

Fargau-Pratjau is a municipality in the district of Plön, in Schleswig-Holstein, Germany.

Between 1990 and 2011, the Jazz Baltica festival was held annually here.
