= Rantzau, Plön =

Rantzau
- Municipality
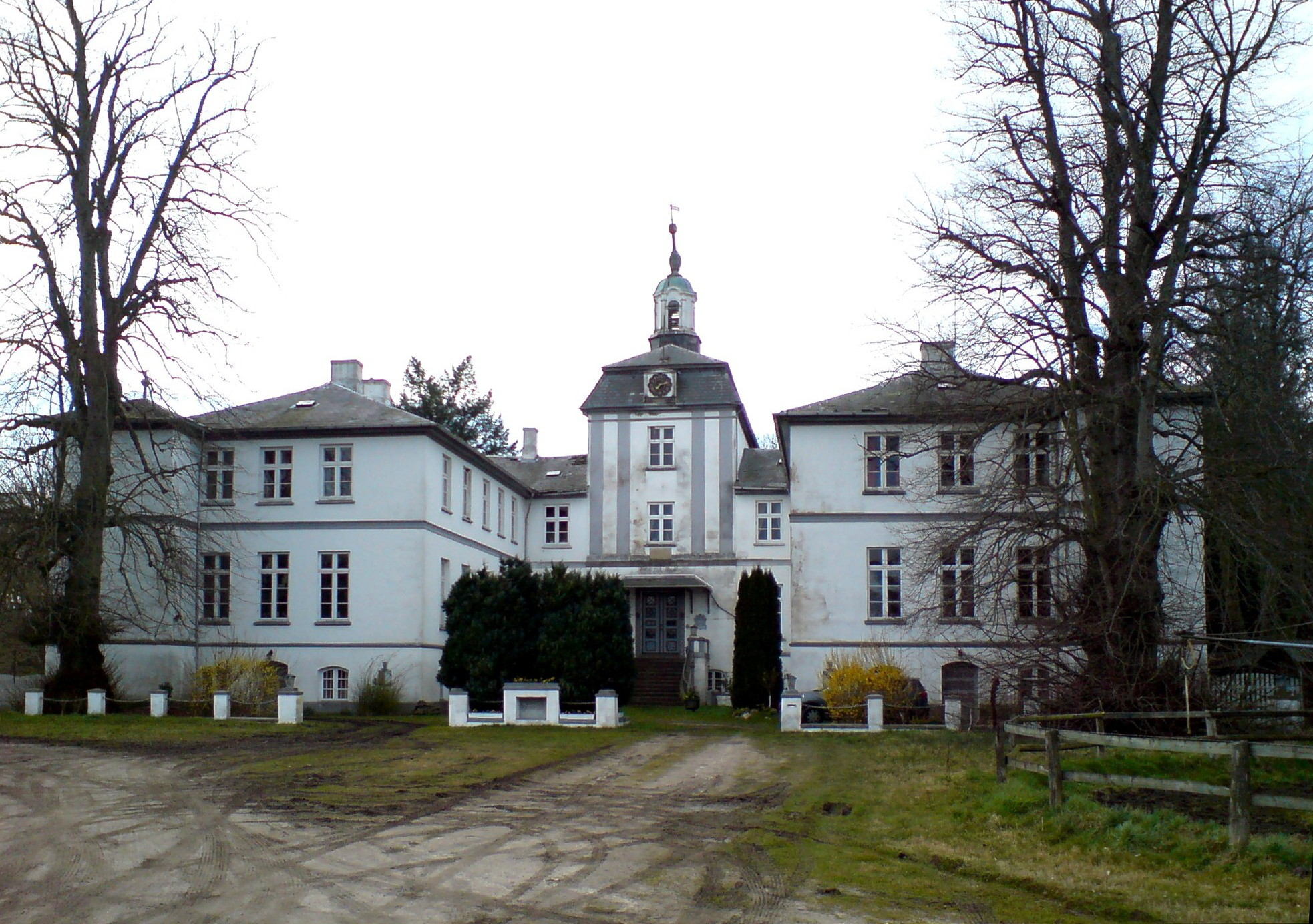
- Schloss Rantzau (Rantzau)

- Flag Coat of arms

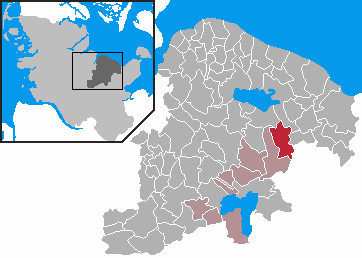
- Location of Rantzau within Plön district
- Interactive map of Rantzau
- Location within Germany Location within Schleswig-Holstein
- Coordinates: 54°15′N 10°31′E
- Country: Germany
- State: Schleswig-Holstein
- District: Plön
- Municipal assoc.: Großer Plöner See

Government
  - Mayor: Hans-Peter Asbahr

Area
  - Total: 16.91 km^{2} (6.53 sq mi)
- Elevation: 39 m (128 ft)

Population (2025-12-31)
  - Total: 323
  - Density: 19.1/km^{2} (49.5/sq mi)
- Time zone: UTC+01:00 (CET)
  - Summer (DST): UTC+02:00 (CEST)
- Postal codes: 24329
- Dialling codes: 04383
- Vehicle registration: PLÖ
- Website: www.amt-grosser- ploener-see.de

Rantzau (German pronunciation: [ˈʁantsaʊ]) is a municipality in the district of Plön, in Schleswig-Holstein, Germany.
