= Lasbek =

- Municipality
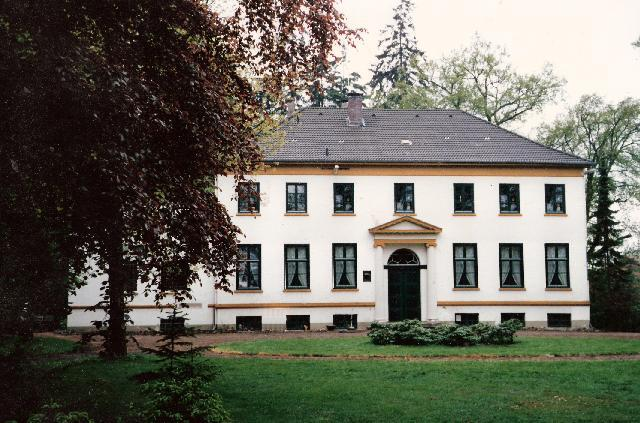
- Krummbek Manor

- Coat of arms

- Location of Lasbek within Stormarn district
- Interactive map of Lasbek
- Location within Germany Location within Schleswig-Holstein
- Coordinates: 53°44′2″N 10°21′48″E
- Country: Germany
- State: Schleswig-Holstein
- District: Stormarn
- Municipal assoc.: Bad Oldesloe-Land

Government
  - Mayor: Harald Lodders (SPD)

Area
  - Total: 12.4 km^{2} (4.8 sq mi)
- Elevation: 45 m (148 ft)

Population (2025-12-31)
  - Total: 1,262
  - Density: 102/km^{2} (264/sq mi)
- Time zone: UTC+01:00 (CET)
  - Summer (DST): UTC+02:00 (CEST)
- Postal codes: 23847
- Dialling codes: 04534
- Vehicle registration: OD
- Website: www.amt-bad- oldesloe-land.de

Lasbek is a municipality in the district of Stormarn, in Schleswig-Holstein, Germany.

== See also ==
- Krummbek Manor
