= Bundesstraße 203 =

Federal highway in Germany

B 203
- Bundesstraße 203

Route information
- Length: 115 km (71 mi)

Major junctions
- Southwest end: Büsum
- Northeast end: Kappeln

Location
- Country: Germany
- States: Schleswig-Holstein

Highway system
- Roads in Germany; Autobahns; List; Federal; List; State; E-roads

The Bundesstraße 203 is a German federal road or Bundesstraße and the west–east link between Büsum, Heide, Rendsburg, Eckernförde and Kappeln in the central part of the state of Schleswig-Holstein.

== Route ==
The B 203 begins in Büsum where it has connections to the ferry to Helgoland. The route continues eastwards to the city of Heide where it has connections to the B 5 and the A 23 motorway. The road continues further east until it reaches the city of Rendsburg where it has connections with the B 77, B 202 and the A 7 motorway. After leaving Rendsburg the route goes northeast to the city of Eckernförde where it crosses the B 76. The road continues further until it ends at the town of Kappeln with connections to the B 199 and the B 201.

== Major junctions ==
State	District	Location	km	mi	Exit	Name	Destinations	Notes
Schleswig-Holstein	Dithmarschen	Büsum				Büsum harbour	Büsum, ferry to Helgoland	ferry cannot be used by motor vehicles because they are banned in Helgoland
Schleswig-Holstein	Dithmarschen	No junctions along Oesterdeichstrich, Friedrichsgabekoog and Wöhrden						
Schleswig-Holstein	Dithmarschen	Norderwöhrden			2	Heide-West	A 23 – Hamburg; B 5 – Husum, Sankt Peter Ording	western endpoint of concurrency with the B 5
Schleswig-Holstein	Dithmarschen	Heide				Heide-Büsumer Straße	B 5 – Brunsbüttel, ( A 23)	eastern endpoint of concurrency with the B 5 cross-level intersection
Schleswig-Holstein	Dithmarschen	Heide				Heide-Hamburger Straße	B 204 – Itzehoe, Albersdorf	former crossing with the B 204 cross-level intersection
Schleswig-Holstein	No junctions along Gaushorn, Welmbüttel, Tellingstedt, Lüdersbüttel, Wrohm, Hamdorf and Elsdorf							
Schleswig-Holstein	Rendsburg-Eckernförde	Fockbek				Fockbek	B 202 – Sankt Peter Ording, Schleswig	western endpoint of concurrency with the B 202 cross-level-intersection
Schleswig-Holstein	Rendsburg-Eckernförde	Rendsburg				Rendsburg-West	B 77 / B 202 – Schleswig, Itzehoe, Hamburg/Flensburg ( A 7), Kiel ( A 210)	eastern endpoint of concurrency with the B 202
Schleswig-Holstein	Rendsburg-Eckernförde	No junctions along central Rendsburg and Büdelsdorf						
Schleswig-Holstein	Rendsburg-Eckernförde	Borgstedt			8	Rendsburg/Büdelsdorf	A 7 / E45 – Hamburg, Flensburg	
Schleswig-Holstein	Rendsburg-Eckernförde	No junctions along Holzbunge and Klein Wittensee						
Schleswig-Holstein	Rendsburg-Eckernförde	Groß Wittensee				Groß Wittensee	Haby, Damendorf, Groß Wittensee	one-quadrant interchange
Schleswig-Holstein	Rendsburg-Eckernförde	No junctions along Goosefeld						
Schleswig-Holstein	Rendsburg-Eckernförde	Eckernförde				Eckernförde-Berliner Straße	B 76 – Lübeck, Kiel	eastern endpoint of concurrency with the B 76 cross-level intersection
Schleswig-Holstein	Rendsburg-Eckernförde	Eckernförde				Eckernförde-Flensburger Straße	B 76 – Schleswig, Flensburg ( A 7)	western endpoint of concurrency with the B 76
Schleswig-Holstein	Rendsburg-Eckernförde	Barkelsby				Barkelsby-Eckernförder Straße	Waabs, Rieseby, Barkelsby	Waaby and Rieseby are only signed eastbound
Schleswig-Holstein	Rendsburg-Eckernförde	Barkelsby				Barkelsby-Bohnrüher Weg	Barkelsby	
Schleswig-Holstein	Rendsburg-Eckernförde	Loose				Loose	Waabs, Rieseby, Loose	Waabs os only signed eastbound Rieseby is only signed westbound
Schleswig-Holstein	Rendsburg-Eckernförde	No junctions along Holzdorf						
Schleswig-Holstein	Rendsburg-Eckernförde	Thumby				Vogelsang-Grünholz	Thumby, Damp, Waabs	Waabs is only signed westbound
Schleswig-Holstein	Rendsburg-Eckernförde	No junctions along Holzdorf						
Schleswig-Holstein	Rendsburg-Eckernförde	Dörphof				Schuby	Dörphof, Schuby	
Schleswig-Holstein	Schleswig-Flensburg	Kappeln				Kappeln-Ostseestraße	Schönhagen, Karby, Winnemark	
Schleswig-Holstein	Schleswig-Flensburg	Kappeln				Kappeln Schlei Bridge	Schlei river	
Schleswig-Holstein	Schleswig-Flensburg	Kappeln				Kappeln-Nordstraße	B 199 – Flensburg, Gelting; B 201 – Schleswig, Süderbrarup, A 7	cross-level intersection
1.000 mi = 1.609 km; 1.000 km = 0.621 mi: Concurrency terminus; Closed/former

== See also ==
- List of federal roads in Germany
