= Schwansen (Amt) =

Coordinates: 54°35′N 10°00′E

Schwansen was an Amt ("collective municipality") in the district of Rendsburg-Eckernförde, in Schleswig-Holstein, Germany. It covered most of the peninsula Schwansen. The seat of the Amt was in Damp.

In January 2008, it was merged with the Ämter Schlei and Windeby to form the Amt Schlei-Ostsee.

The Amt Schwansen consisted of the following municipalities:

1. Brodersby
2. Damp
3. Dörphof
4. Holzdorf
5. Karby
6. Thumby
7. Waabs
8. Winnemark
