= Windeby (Amt) =

Coordinates: 54.467°N 9.833°E

Windeby was an Amt ("collective municipality") in the district of Rendsburg-Eckernförde, in Schleswig-Holstein, Germany. The seat of the Amt was in Eckernförde, which wasn't part of the Amt.

In January 2008, it was merged with the Ämter Schwansen and Schlei to form the Amt Schlei-Ostsee.

The Amt Windeby consisted of the following municipalities:

1. Altenhof
2. Barkelsby
3. Gammelby
4. Goosefeld
5. Loose
6. Windeby
