= Bay of Kiel =

Bay in the southwestern Baltic Sea

Coordinates: 54°31′12″N 10°24′24″E

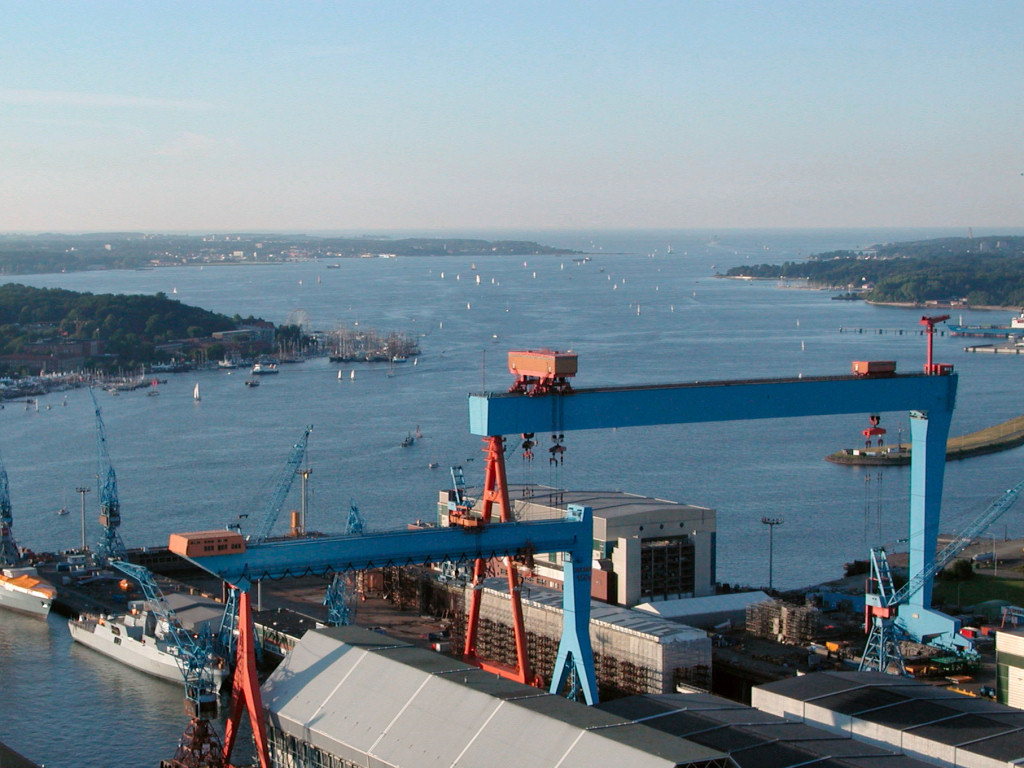
Kiel Fjord, Bay and shipyard crane

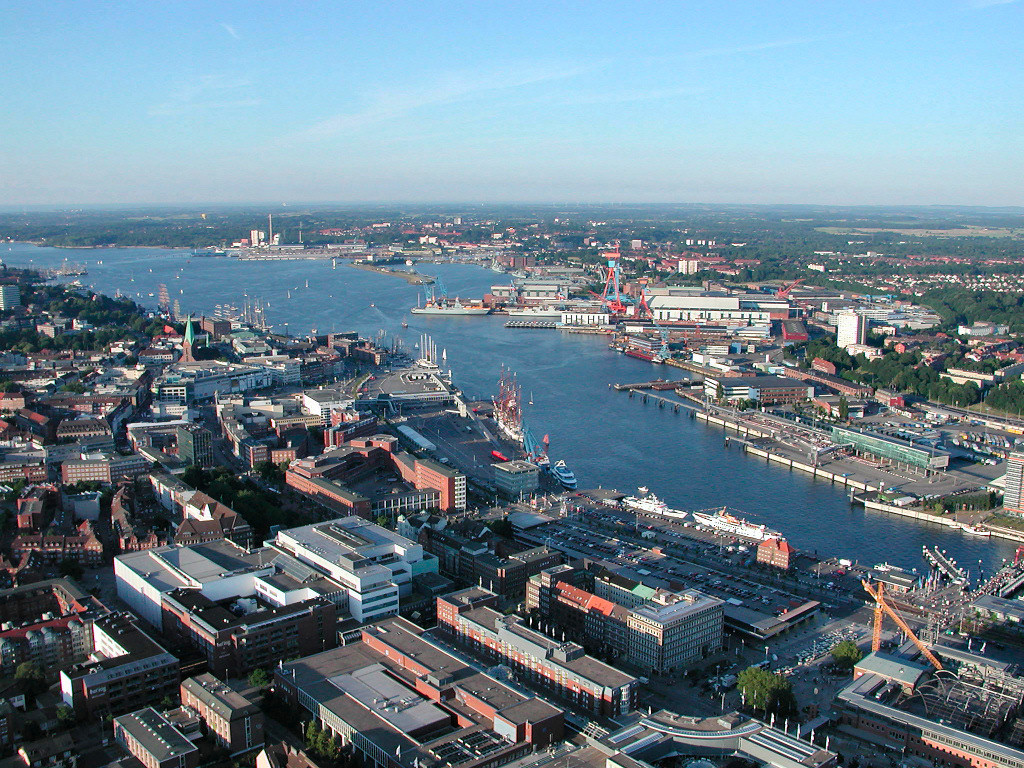
Kiel

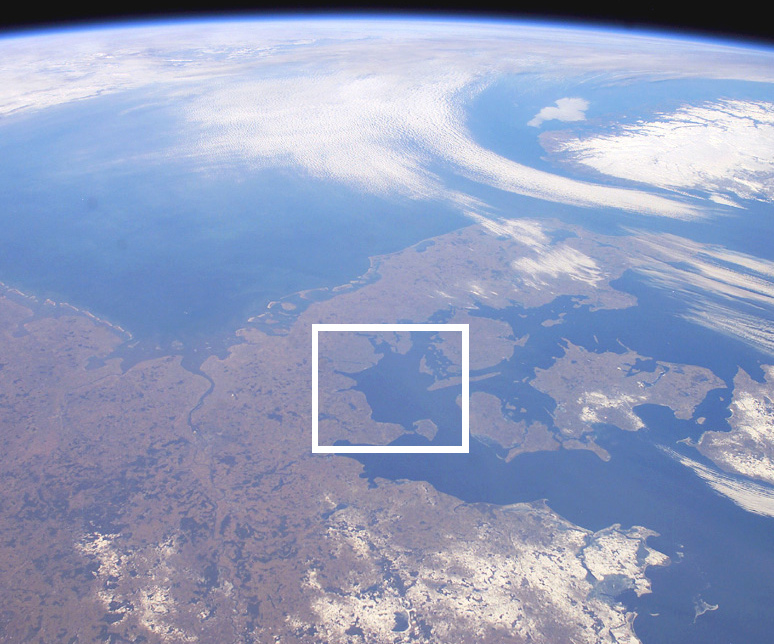
Satellite photo highlighting the Bay of Kiel. Germany is in the lower left half and Denmark in the center

The Bay of Kiel or Kiel Bay (German: Kieler Bucht, German pronunciation; Danish: Kiel Bugt) is a bay in the southwestern Baltic Sea, off the shores of Schleswig-Holstein in Germany and the islands of Denmark. It is connected with the Bay of Mecklenburg in the east, the Little Belt in the northwest, and the Great Belt in the North.

Maritime traffic entering or leaving the Baltic through the two Belts must enter the bay. Once in, through traffic to the Baltic passes through another strait, the Fehmarn Belt, into the Bay of Mecklenburg, which opens out into the Baltic Sea. In the other direction, traffic can either pass northward through the Great Belt, keeping Langeland on the port side, or enter the Kiel Fjord and traverse the Kiel Canal directly to the mouth of the Elbe River and the North Sea. The Kiel Fjord ends at Kiel, the capital of Schleswig-Holstein.

== Geography ==
The southwest shore of the bay is the coast of Schleswig-Holstein. From the latter drains the Schlei inlet, actually a brackish estuary, at the head of which is the city named after it, Schleswig. In that coast also are two other smaller bays: the Eckernförde Bay and the Flensburg Fjord. In the north are the Danish islands of Als, Ærø, and Langeland.

=== Kieler Förde ===
Kieler Förde, projecting from the bay to the south, is about 17 km long and 1 km wide at its narrowest point. The strategic location was not lost on the founders of Holstein, of which Kiel was intended to be a major city. It became a prolific shipyard, which made it a prime target of allied bombing in World War II. Before the foundation of Kiel in 1242 and the construction of a walled city there, the region could not have escaped settlement, especially by the Vikings. Any archaeological trace of them, however, either lies under the city or was disturbed long ago.

=== Eckernförde Bay ===
Eckernförde Bay is about 16 km long and turns at the mouth, with the south bank on approximately ten km of the Bay of Kiel. The border with Kiel Fjord is at Bülker lighthouse. The once forested peninsula between Kiel Fjord and Eckernförde Bay formed the borderland between the Saxons and the Danes in the Middle Ages. It was termed the Danish Wold. North of Eckernförde Bay is the Schwansen region; at the end of the bay is the city of Eckernförde. The bay itself hosted the sailing events for the 1936 Summer Olympics mainly held in Berlin.

=== Schlei ===
The 42-km Schlei forms the border between the historical regions Angeln and Schwansen. This part of the bay hosted the sailing competitions for the 1972 Summer Olympics held in mainly held Munich, Bavaria.

=== Flensburg Fjord ===
Flensburg Fjord is approximately 50 km long. It forms part of the border between Germany and Denmark and marks north border of Angeln.
