= Schlei (Amt) =

Former Amt in Germany

Coordinates: 54°30′N 9°46′E

Schlei was an Amt ("collective municipality") in the district of Rendsburg-Eckernförde, in Schleswig-Holstein, Germany. It was situated on the south-eastern bank of the Schlei, an inlet of the Baltic Sea, between Eckernförde and Schleswig. The village Fleckeby was the seat of the Amt.

In January 2008, it was merged with the Ämter Schwansen and Windeby to form the Amt Schlei-Ostsee.

The Amt Schlei consisted of the following municipalities (population in 2005 between brackets):

- Fleckeby (1,808)
- Güby (842)
- Hummelfeld (275)
- Kosel (1,339)
- Rieseby (2,559)
