= Schlei (disambiguation) =

Schlei is a narrow inlet of the Baltic Sea in Schleswig-Holstein in northern Germany. It may also refer to:

- Schlei (Amt), district of Rendsburg-Eckernförde, in Schleswig-Holstein, Germany
- Schlei (surname), list of people with the surname Schlei
- Schlei-Ostsee, collective municipality in Rendsburg-Eckernförde, Schleswig-Holstein, Germany
