= Fleckeby =

Fleckeby Flækkeby
- Municipality
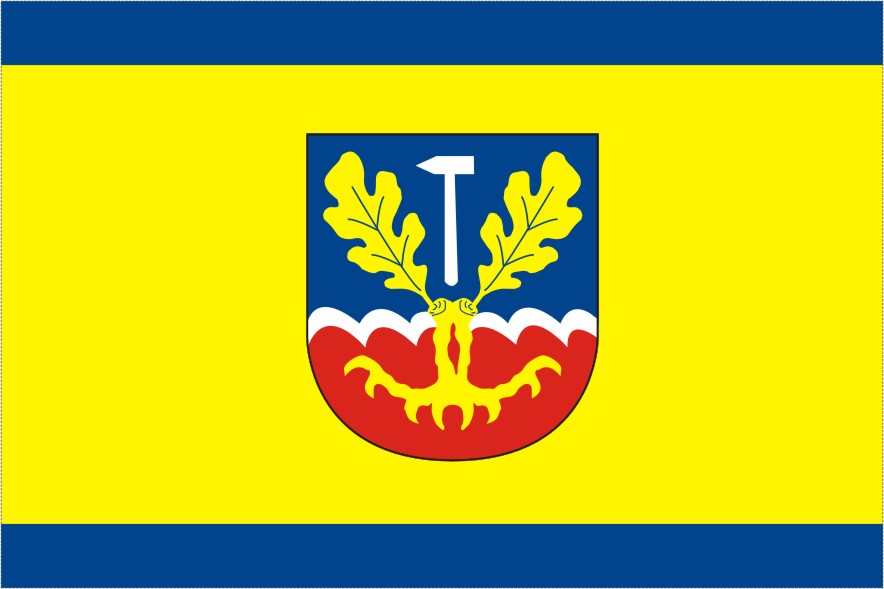
- Flag Coat of arms

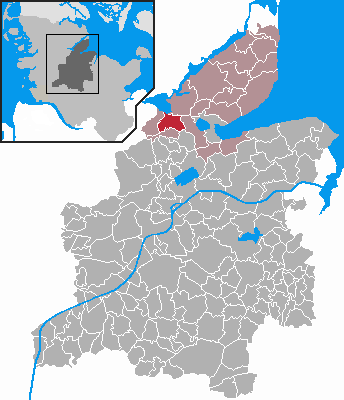
- Location of Fleckeby; Flækkeby within Rendsburg-Eckernförde district
- Interactive map of Fleckeby; Flækkeby
- Location within Germany Location within Schleswig-Holstein
- Coordinates: 54°29′6″N 9°42′13″E
- Country: Germany
- State: Schleswig-Holstein
- District: Rendsburg-Eckernförde
- Municipal assoc.: Schlei-Ostsee

Government
  - Mayor: Heinrich Hauschildt

Area
  - Total: 12.31 km^{2} (4.75 sq mi)
- Elevation: 8 m (26 ft)

Population (2025-12-31)
  - Total: 2,000
  - Density: 160/km^{2} (420/sq mi)
- Time zone: UTC+01:00 (CET)
  - Summer (DST): UTC+02:00 (CEST)
- Postal codes: 24357
- Dialling codes: 04354
- Vehicle registration: RD
- Website: www.amt-schlei- ostsee.de

Fleckeby (German pronunciation: [ˈflɛkəbyː]; Danish: Flækkeby) is a municipality in the district of Rendsburg-Eckernförde, in Schleswig-Holstein, Germany.

Fleckeby is east of the municipality of Güby, but north of Hummelfeld.

== Geography ==
=== Geographical location ===
The municipal area of Fleckeby lies within the natural region known as Schwansen, Dänischer Wohld (and Amt Hütten) (unit no. 701), at the transition from the Peninsula, situated between the Schlei inlet and the Eckernförde Bay, to the Hüttener Berge, which continue to the southwest.

Within the municipality, the Große Hüttener Au (also called Noelsbek; known locally in Fleckeby as the Fleckebyer Au; Danish: Nølsbæk or Nolsbæk) flows into the Große Breite of the Schlei, together with the Osterbek, which joins it shortly before the confluence.

=== Administrative divisions ===
The municipality includes the villages of Fleckeby, Götheby-Holm (Danish: Gøteby-Holm), Herweg, Dürwade (Danish: Dyrvad), Neumöhlhorst, and Engsiek (Danish: Engsig), as well as the residential estate belonging to Möhlhorst Manor (Danish: Mølskov).

== History ==
The village of Fleckby was first mentioned in documents in 1196, on the occasion of the dissolution of the St. Michael's Monastery in Schleswing, under the name Fekabicol. The place name is of Danish origin and roughly means "Herb Village", deriving from feka, or "marsh herb". The village of Götheby was first recorded in 1327; its name means "village or settlement of Gøtti," a personal name that refers to the Goths or Geats.

In 1856, Fleckeby became the main settlement of the Hüttener Harde. The Hardesvogt (regional administrator) Maximilian Franciscus Blaunfeldt had the building of the so-called Hardesvogtei constructed here.

On 12 February 1974, the formerly independent municipalities of Götheby-Holm and Fleckeby were merged.

The municipality also includes the estate of Möhlhorst (Mølskov) on the Osterbek.
