= Eckernförde Bay =

Firth in the western Baltic Sea

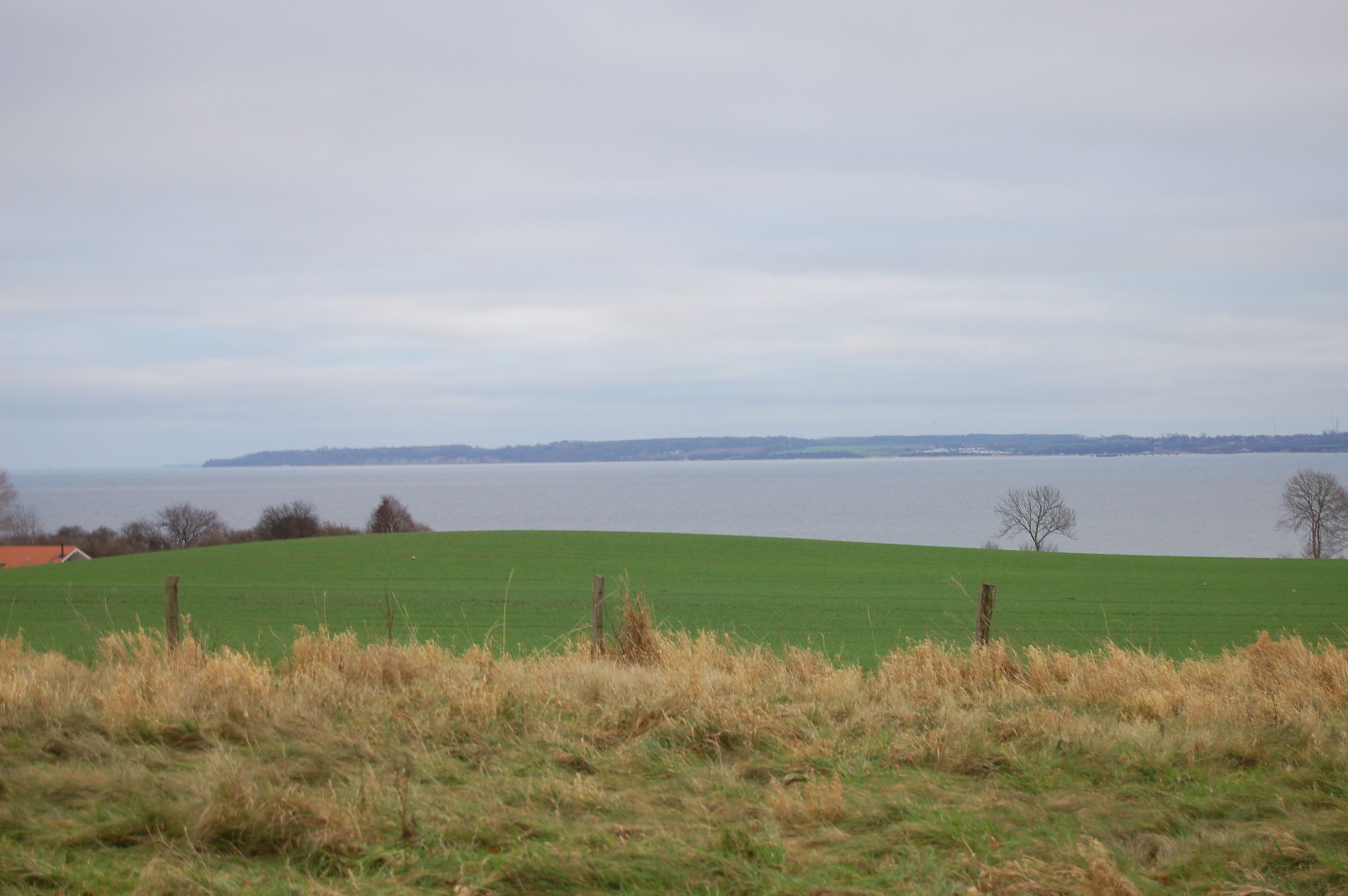

- Location within Schleswig-Holstein Location within Germany
- Location: Schleswig-Holstein, Germany
- Coordinates: 54°28′41″N 9°56′42″E
- Type: firth
- Part of: Bay of Kiel
- Max. length: 17 km (11 mi)
- Max. width: 10 km (6.2 mi)
- Max. depth: 28 m (92 ft)

Eckernförde Bay (German: Eckernförder Bucht; Danish: Egernførde Fjord or Egernfjord) is a firth and a branch of the Bay of Kiel between the Danish Wahld peninsula in the south and the Schwansen peninsula in the north in the Baltic Sea off the lands of Schleswig-Holstein, Germany. The bay extends around 17 km (11 mi) deep into the land and is 10 km (6.2 mi) wide at its entrance where Booknis-Eck (municipality of Waabs) and Danish-Nienhof (municipality of Schwedeneck) mark the endpoints. The bay is up to 28 m (92 ft) deep. The border to the Kiel Fjord lies at the Bülk Lighthouse. The once forested Danish Wahld peninsula between Kiel Fjord and Eckernförde Bay constituted the borderland between the Saxons and the Danes until the Middle Ages. At the inner end of the bay lies the town of Eckernförde.

== Geography ==
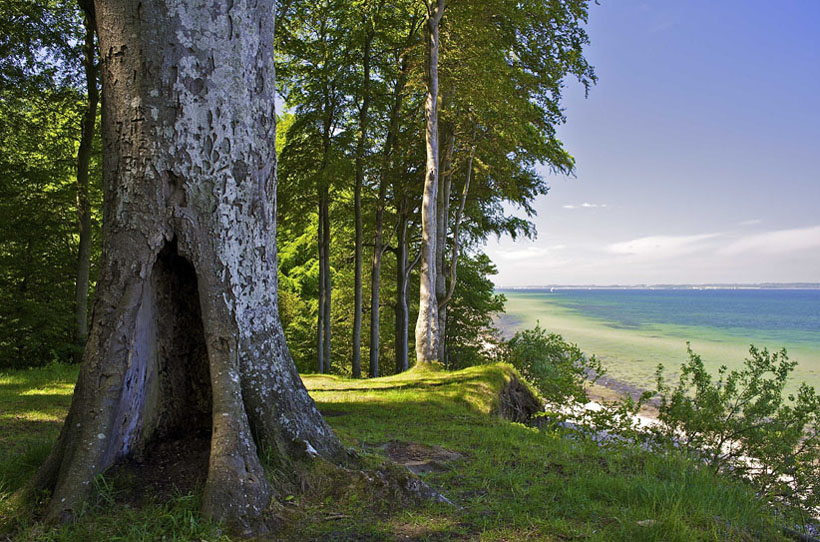
Beech tree forest in rural Noer municipality, Eckernförde Bay

The bay formed during the last Ice Age between 120,000 and 10,000 years ago from a glacier. According to some geologists, the depth contour of the Eckernförde Bay had already formed before the Ice Age and contributed to the fact that the Eckernförde glacier was divided into two parts, the northern Windebyer-Noor and the southern Wittensee-Goossee.

The original post-glacial end of Eckernförde Bay, today's Windebyer Noor, is now separated from the Baltic Sea by a headland on which the town of Eckernförde was built. In 1929 man-made embankments further separated the Noor. There are plans to establish a canal between the Bay and the Windebyer Noor.

The shores of the bay are shaped by the tides and the surf as during high winds from the northeast and southwest, heavy sea might build up. When the water level is 0.75 m (2.5 ft) higher than usual, sand and gravel is being eroded from the cliff coast. In some places, the coastline recedes 15 to 20 cm (5.9 to 7.9 in) every year. As a result, the hills of the Terminal moraines, that had formed during the last Ice Age in the southeast are hollowed out and a 30 m (98 ft) high and 3.6 km (2.2 mi) long cliff has formed in front of Altenhof. The steadily eroded material is partly deposited further west and has separated the Goossee from the Eckernförde Bay. Several sand banks run parallel to the beach. The banks are mainly forested with deciduous trees.

== History ==
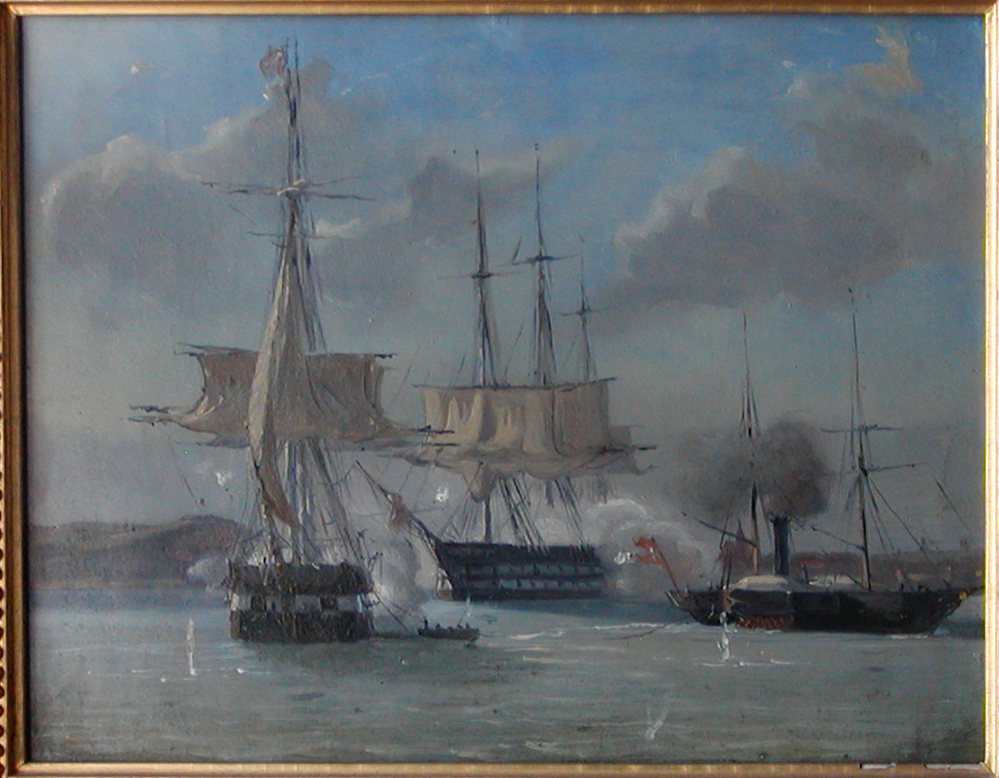
Battle of Eckernförde, 1849

As Danish tribes had settled in Schwansen since around 700 CE. and German settlers had arrived at Danish Wahld around 1260, the Eckernförde Bay became the linguistic border between Low German in the south and Danish in the north. The divide is still noticeable in the Danish-Nordic toponyms in Schwansen, where German as Lingua franca was subsequently used. However, Danish also remained in widespread use in Schwansen until the 19th century. Both Schwansen and the Danish Wahld retained their feudal character until the Early Modern Period.

During the Battle of Eckernförde in 1849, the Danish ship of the line Christian VIII and the Danish frigate Gefion were shot at by beach batteries from Schleswig-Holstein troops. Christian VIII eventually exploded and the crew of the frigate surrendered and the ship was taken over by the Schleswig-Holstein army.

A few years later, the 1872 Baltic Sea flood caused severe damage to the coastal towns of Eckernförde Bay. The town of Eckernförde in particular suffered the most.

== Economy, infrastructure and transport ==
The Eckernförde Bay is a popular holiday destination. The seaside resort Eckernförde registers around 135,000 overnight stays a year. There are eleven campsites scattered around the bay. The waters of the bay are also the starting point for the ancient Aalregatta during the Kiel Week.

The Bundeswehr operates several bases and facilities at Eckernförde Bay, such as the WTD 71, an institute for Marine technology and research, a restricted military area, that is off limit for civilians.

Since the 15th century a road on the beach wall (near the modern Bundesstrasse 76) existed between Goossee and Eckernförde Bay, which was later converted into a dam. The dam was badly damaged in the 1872 flood of the Baltic Sea, as the road built in the 17th century was no longer functional. The road was rebuilt and the dam was raised. The modern road was built in 1965.

The Kiel–Flensburg railway (built by the Kiel-Eckernförde-Flensburger Eisenbahn-Gesellschaft - KEFE) runs parallel to the road that is operated by the Schleswig-Holstein Regional Railway.

Numerous bicycle paths, such as the Baltic Sea Cycle Route criss-cross the Eckernförde Bay area. The Baltic Sea Cycle Route traverses around the Baltic Sea as part of the European EuroVelo network. The region is thus connected with Kiel, Lübeck and Copenhagen.
