= Windeby =

Windeby Vindeby
- Municipality
- Coat of arms

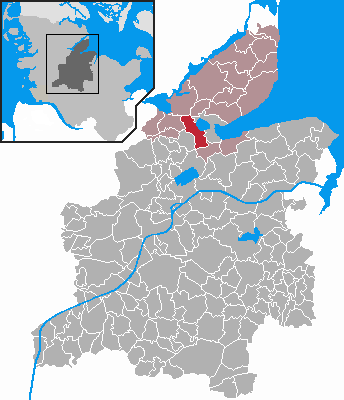
- Location of Windeby; Vindeby within Rendsburg-Eckernförde district
- Interactive map of Windeby; Vindeby
- Location within Germany Location within Schleswig-Holstein
- Coordinates: 54°28′N 9°49′E
- Country: Germany
- State: Schleswig-Holstein
- District: Rendsburg-Eckernförde
- Municipal assoc.: Schlei-Ostsee

Government
  - Mayor: Klaus-Dieter Kaschke

Area
  - Total: 14.77 km^{2} (5.70 sq mi)
- Elevation: 10 m (33 ft)

Population (2025-12-31)
  - Total: 981
  - Density: 66.4/km^{2} (172/sq mi)
- Time zone: UTC+01:00 (CET)
  - Summer (DST): UTC+02:00 (CEST)
- Postal codes: 24340
- Dialling codes: 04351
- Vehicle registration: RD
- Website: www.amt-schlei- ostsee.de

Windeby (Danish: Vindeby) is a municipality in the district of Rendsburg-Eckernförde, in Schleswig-Holstein, Germany. It is situated approximately 2 km west of Eckernförde.

Windeby is part of the Amt ("collective municipality") Windeby. The seat of the Amt is in Eckernförde.

Windeby is east of the municipality of Fleckeby or Osterby, but north of Goosefeld.

Windeby means Wendish village in Danish and indicates a previous Lechite settlement in the village.
