= Schlei (surname) =

Schlei is a surname, and people with the surname are as follows:

- Admiral Schlei (1878–1958), American baseball player
- Blake Lindsley, born Norma Blake Lindsley Schlei, American actress
- Marie Schlei (1919–1983), German politician

== See also ==
- Schlei (disambiguation)
