= Bülk Lighthouse =

Lighthouse in Schleswig-Holstein, Germany

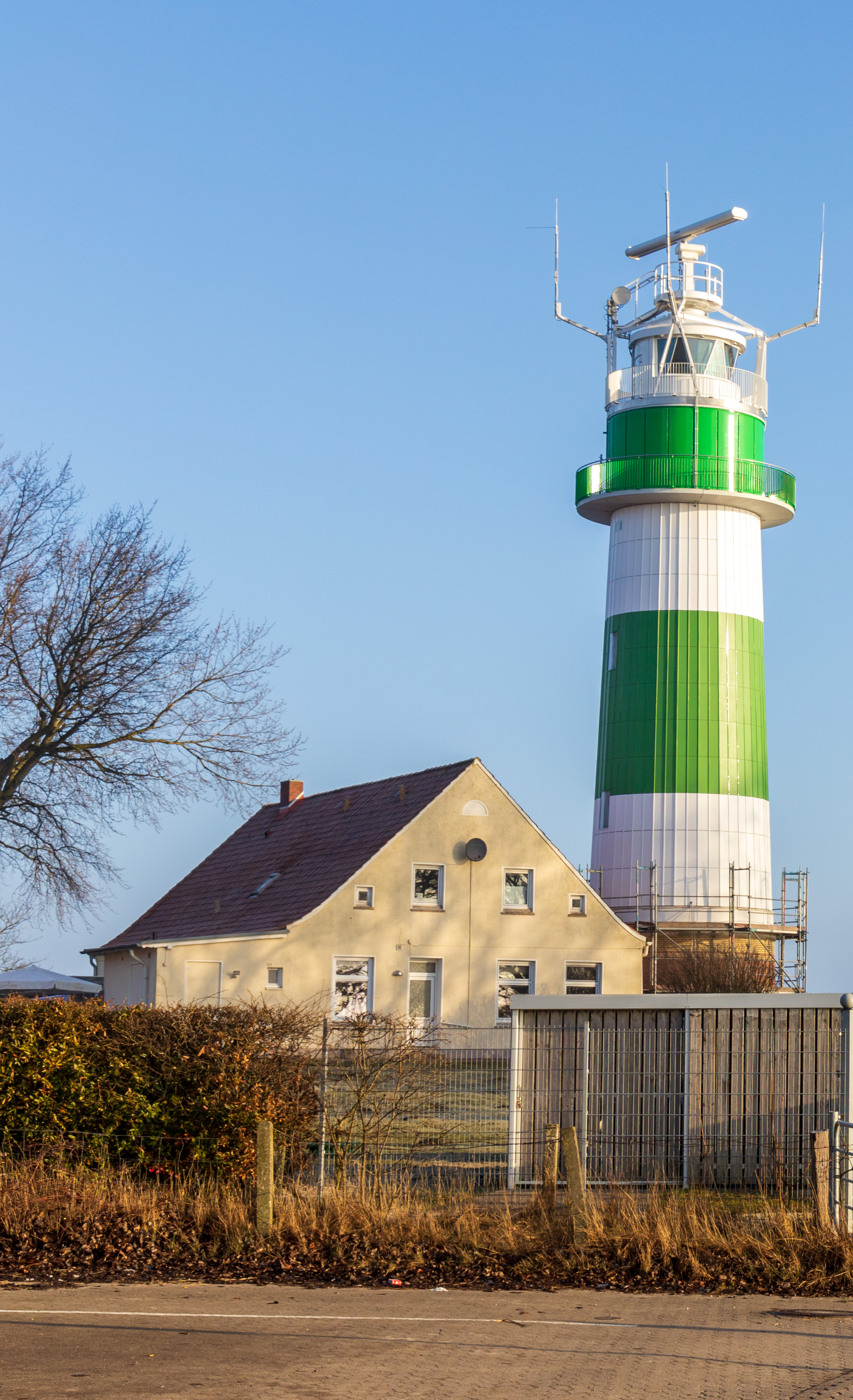
- Leuchtturm Bülk, 2021
- Location: Kieler Förde, Germany
- Coordinates: 54°27′18.9″N 10°11′50.3″E

Tower
- Constructed: 1807 (first)
- Construction: brick tower
- Automated: 1970
- Height: 25.6 metres (84 ft)
- Shape: cylindrical tower with balcony and lantern
- Markings: white tower with a horizontal black band
- Operator: Leuchttürm Bülk

Light
- First lit: 1865
- Focal height: 29 metres (95 ft)
- Lens: Fresnel lens
- Range: 14 nautical miles (26 km; 16 mi)
- Characteristic: Fl WR 3s.

Bülk Lighthouse (German: Leuchtturm Bülk) is on the westernmost headland of the Kieler Förde on the Baltic Sea coast of Schleswig-Holstein, Germany. It is the oldest lighthouse on the Kieler Förde and serves as a guiding light to the entrance into the fjord. A red light sector warns of the Stollergrund shoal. It is a popular attraction for visitors.

== History ==
In 1807 the Danish authorities had already established a lighthouse and pilot station on the Bülker Huk headland. The tower featured six Argand lamps with curved mirrors but didn’t become operational until 1815 owing to the Napoleonic Wars. In 1843 this tower was destroyed by lightning and replaced by a tower with a rotating lens.

The construction of the current tower was begun in 1862 by the Danes but owing to the Second Schleswig War it was not completed until 1865, by Prussia. The tower used to be white with a red band and had a Fresnel lens.

However, shortly after the lighting was installed the Bülk Lighthouse was no longer sufficient to secure shipping in the Kieler Förde and a lightvessel was moored in the entrance to the fjord.

In 1910 the Fresnel lens was replaced by a set of four spotlights. The original lens was later sold to private owners Until 1969 the lighthouse served as a direction light. It was rebuilt as a guiding light from 1969 to 1970 and again a Fresnel lens was installed. The tower was covered in an asbestos cement casing, received a black band and was shortened by 2 m. Since then it has been open to the public, managed by a tenant.

Since the last construction works there have been no lighthouse keepers at Bülk. Previously, there were three keepers who worked in shifts and had their families living on site.

== Technical facts ==
The Bülk Lighthouse is 25.6 m tall. The lower platform, which is open to visitors, is at a height of 22 m. Since 1999 the Fresnel optic has been lit by a 120-V high-voltage halogen lamp with a power of 600 Watt. The characteristic is one flash every three seconds, with a range of 16 nautical miles for white light.

== See also ==
- List of lighthouses and lightvessels in Germany
