= Gammelby =

- Municipality
- Coat of arms

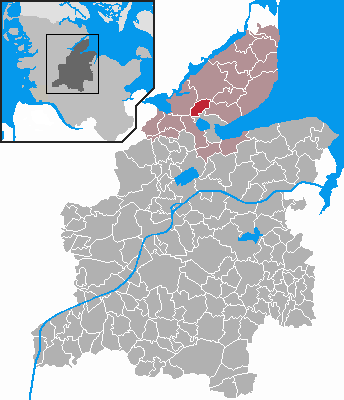
- Location of Gammelby within Rendsburg-Eckernförde district
- Interactive map of Gammelby
- Location within Germany Location within Schleswig-Holstein
- Coordinates: 54°30′8″N 9°47′48″E
- Country: Germany
- State: Schleswig-Holstein
- District: Rendsburg-Eckernförde
- Municipal assoc.: Schlei-Ostsee

Government
  - Mayor: Marlies Thoms-Pfeffer

Area
  - Total: 8.3 km^{2} (3.2 sq mi)
- Elevation: 13 m (43 ft)

Population (2025-12-31)
  - Total: 501
  - Density: 60/km^{2} (160/sq mi)
- Time zone: UTC+01:00 (CET)
  - Summer (DST): UTC+02:00 (CEST)
- Postal codes: 24340
- Dialling codes: 04351, 04355
- Vehicle registration: RD
- Website: www.amt-schlei- ostsee.de

Gammelby is a municipality in the district of Rendsburg-Eckernförde, in Schleswig-Holstein, Germany.

The name means "Old Town" in Danish.
