= Hummelfeld =

Hummelfeld Hummelmark
- Municipality
- Coat of arms

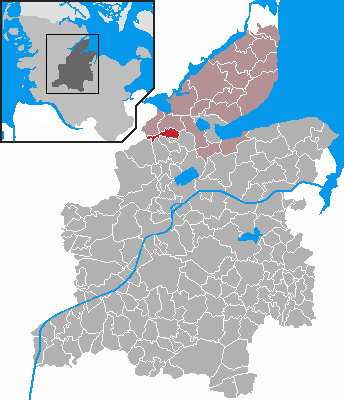
- Location of Hummelfeld; Hummelmark within Rendsburg-Eckernförde district
- Interactive map of Hummelfeld; Hummelmark
- Location within Germany Location within Schleswig-Holstein
- Coordinates: 54°28′N 9°43′E
- Country: Germany
- State: Schleswig-Holstein
- District: Rendsburg-Eckernförde
- Municipal assoc.: Schlei-Ostsee

Government
  - Mayor: Heini Schulz

Area
  - Total: 7.98 km^{2} (3.08 sq mi)
- Elevation: 13 m (43 ft)

Population (2025-12-31)
  - Total: 266
  - Density: 33.3/km^{2} (86.3/sq mi)
- Time zone: UTC+01:00 (CET)
  - Summer (DST): UTC+02:00 (CEST)
- Postal codes: 24357
- Dialling codes: 04353
- Vehicle registration: RD
- Website: www.amt-schlei- ostsee.de

Hummelfeld (Danish: Hummelmark) is a municipality in the district of Rendsburg-Eckernförde, in Schleswig-Holstein, Germany.

Hummelfeld is south of the municipality of Güby or Fleckeby, but north of Ascheffel, Hütten and Osterby.
