= Güby =

Güby Gyby
- Municipality
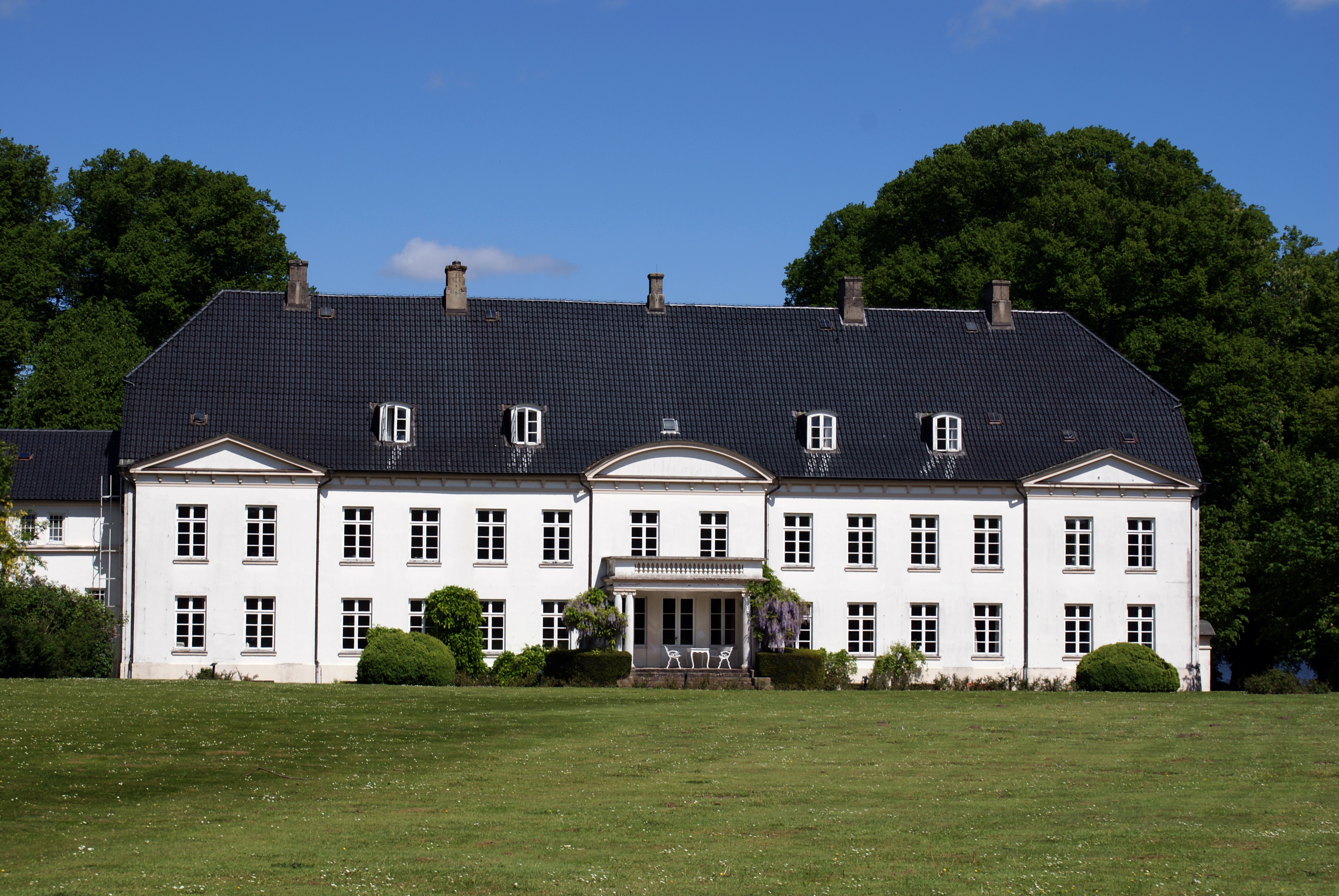
- Stiftung Louisenlund

- Coat of arms

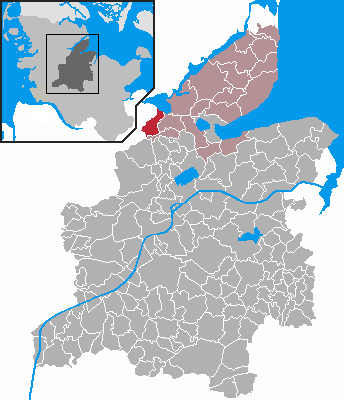
- Location of Güby; Gyby within Rendsburg-Eckernförde district
- Interactive map of Güby; Gyby
- Location within Germany Location within Schleswig-Holstein
- Coordinates: 54°29′4″N 9°39′57″E
- Country: Germany
- State: Schleswig-Holstein
- District: Rendsburg-Eckernförde
- Municipal assoc.: Schlei-Ostsee

Government
  - Mayor: Heinz Meggers (CDU)

Area
  - Total: 11.9 km^{2} (4.6 sq mi)
- Elevation: 33 m (108 ft)

Population (2025-12-31)
  - Total: 652
  - Density: 54.8/km^{2} (142/sq mi)
- Time zone: UTC+01:00 (CET)
  - Summer (DST): UTC+02:00 (CEST)
- Postal codes: 24357
- Dialling codes: 04354
- Vehicle registration: RD
- Website: www.amt-schlei- ostsee.de

Güby (German pronunciation: [ˈɡyːbi]; Danish: Gyby) is a municipality in the district of Rendsburg-Eckernförde, in Schleswig-Holstein, Germany.

Güby is west of the municipality of Fleckeby, but north of Hummelfeld.
