= Schlei-Ostsee =

Office in Schleswig-Holstein

- Amt
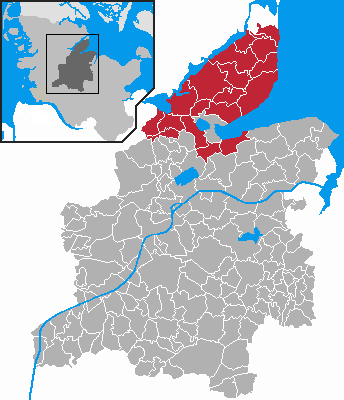
- Map of Rendsburg-Eckernförde highlighting Schlei-Ostsee
- Interactive map of Schlei-Ostsee
- Location within Germany Location within Schleswig-Holstein
- Coordinates: 54°35′N 10°00′E
- Country: Germany
- State: Schleswig-Holstein
- District: Rendsburg-Eckernförde
- Seat: Eckernförde
- Subdivisions: 19 municipalities

Government
  - Mayor: Gunnar Bock

Area
  - Total: 305.18 km^{2} (117.83 sq mi)

Population (2025-12-31)
  - Total: 18,744
  - Density: 61.419/km^{2} (159.08/sq mi)
- Time zone: UTC+01:00 (CET)
  - Summer (DST): UTC+02:00 (CEST)
- Website: www.amt-schlei-ostsee.de

Schlei-Ostsee is an Amt ("collective municipality") in the district of Rendsburg-Eckernförde, in Schleswig-Holstein, Germany. Its seat is in Eckernförde, itself not part of the Amt. It was formed on 1 January 2008 from the former Ämter Schlei, Schwansen and Windeby.

The Amt Schlei-Ostsee consists of the following municipalities:

1. Altenhof
2. Barkelsby
3. Brodersby
4. Damp
5. Dörphof
6. Fleckeby
7. Gammelby
8. Goosefeld
9. Güby
10. Holzdorf
11. Hummelfeld
12. Karby
13. Kosel
14. Loose
15. Rieseby
16. Thumby
17. Waabs
18. Windeby
19. Winnemark
