= Kiel Fjord =

Fjord in Germany

Coordinates: 54°22′4″N 10°10′23″E

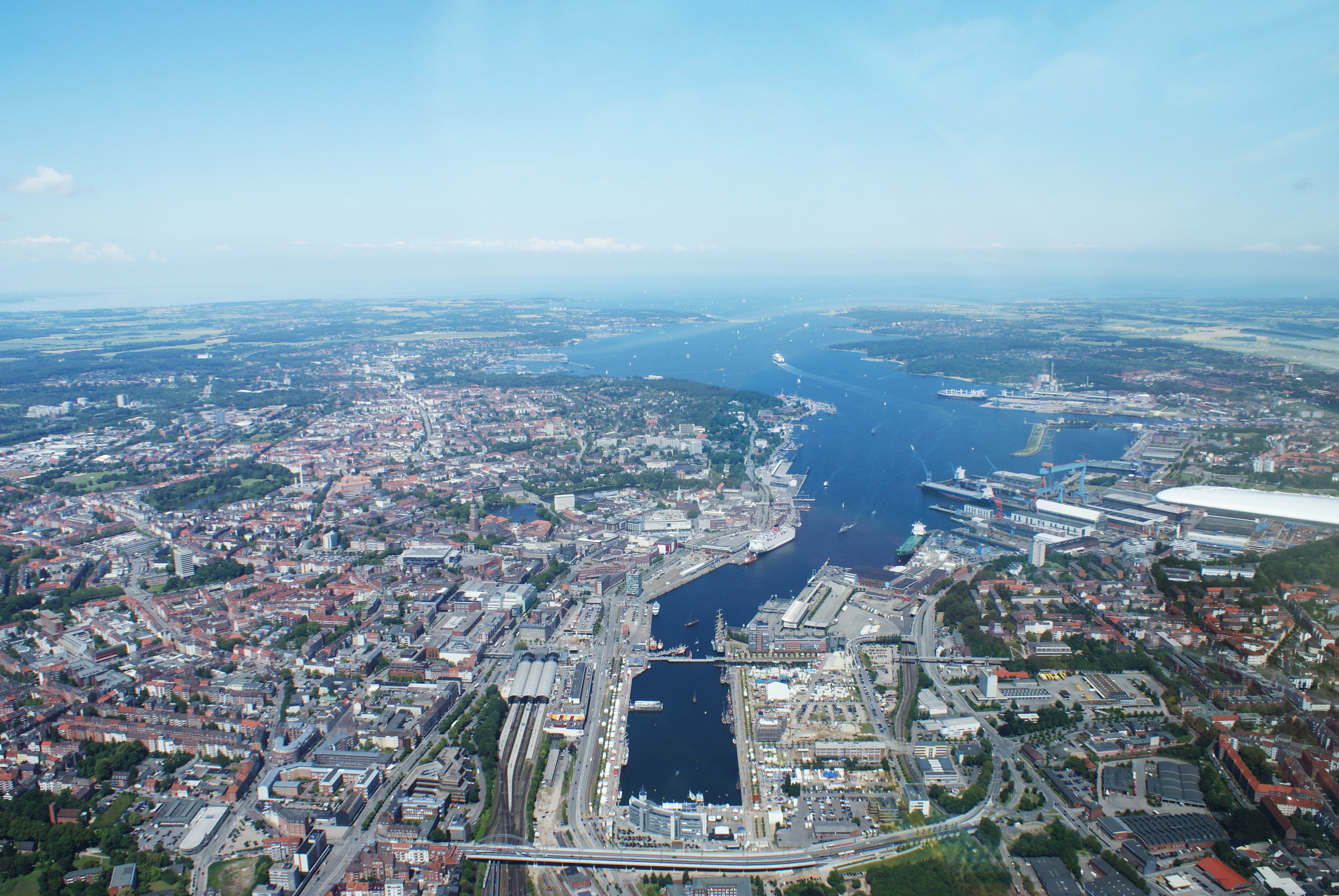
View of the fjord from over Kiel (2009)

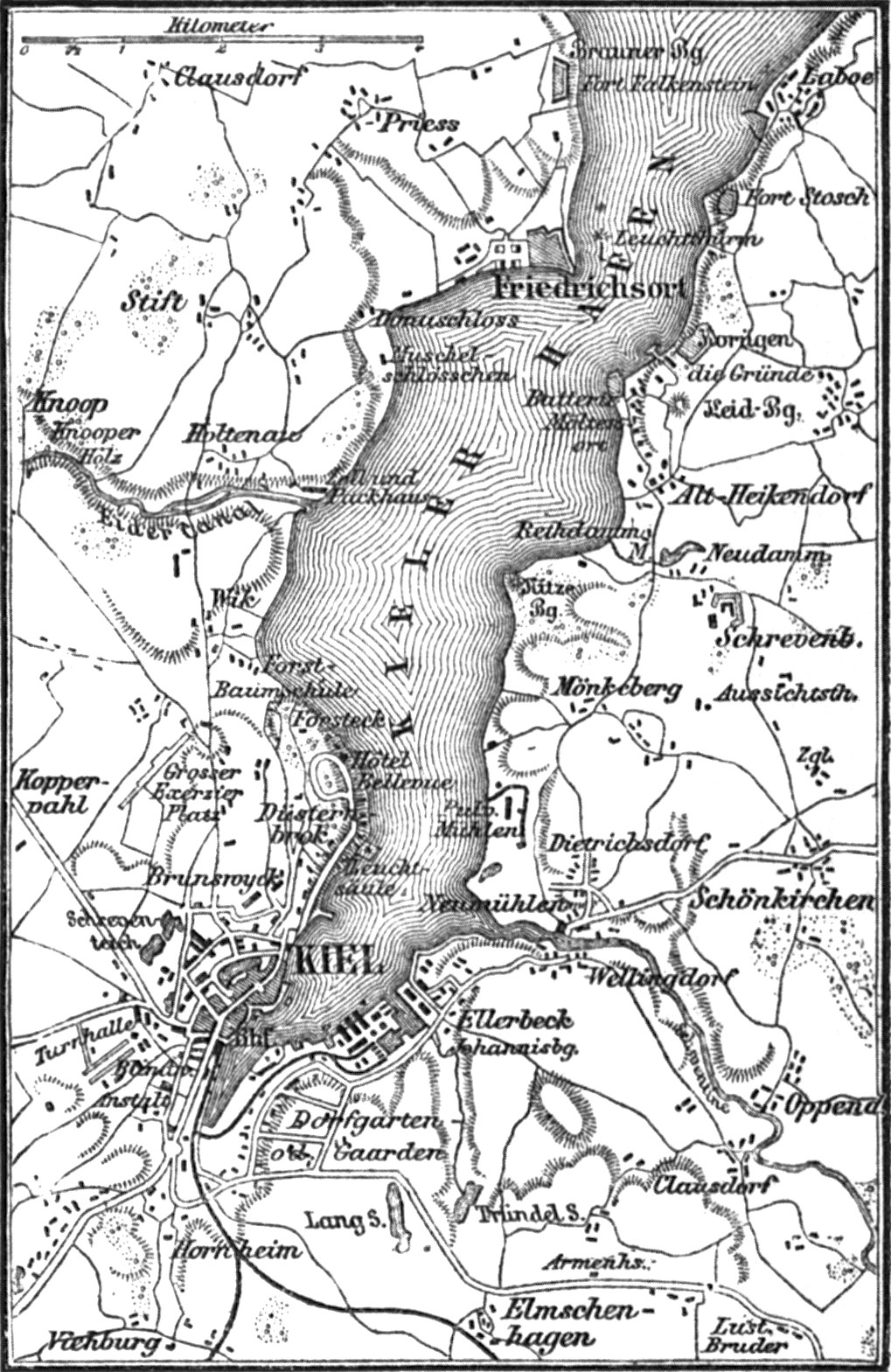
Map of Kiel and environs, c. 1890

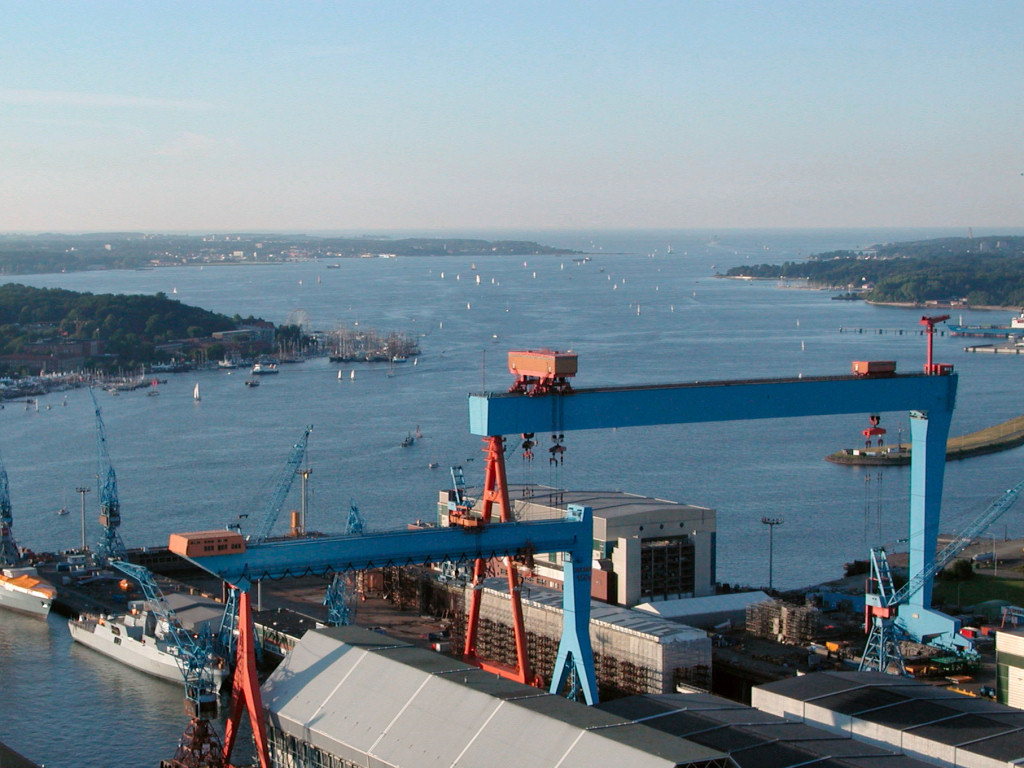
View of the fjord from over the Howaldtswerke-Deutsche Werft shipyard (2003)

The Kiel Fjord (German: Kieler Förde) is an inlet of the Baltic Sea on the eastern side of Schleswig-Holstein, Germany. Beginning at the Bay of Kiel, it extends inland for about 17 kilometres (11 mi), dividing the Dänischer Wohld from Wagrien. It terminates at the Hörn, a sheet of water in the centre of Kiel.

The Kiel Canal, which allows ships to pass between the North and Baltic seas without rounding Jutland, has its eastern terminus on the Kiel Fjord. At its narrowest point, the Friedrichsorter Enge, the fjord is only one kilometre wide. The river Schwentine enters the ford near Kiel-Dietrichsdorf.

== Locations ==
Locations on the Kiel Fjord:

=== Western shore ===
From north to south:

- Bülk (Bülk Lighthouse)
- Strande (fishery and sporting harbor)
- Kiel-Schilksee (Olympic harbor)
- Falckenstein (Kiel's duty-free beach)
- Kiel-Friedrichsort (traditionsreicher Industriestandort)
- Kiel-Holtenau (Kiel Canal)
- Kiel-Wik
- Kiel-Düsternbrook
- Kiel-Zentrum (offices of the large Scandinavian cruise ships)

=== Eastern shore ===
From north to south:

- Heidkate
- Wendtorf in Probstei (vacation site, large natural yacht harbor (Marina Wendtorf), fishing village)
- Stein in Probstei
- Laboe (vacation site, Laboe Naval Memorial, U-Boat, fishery, and two sport harbours)
- Möltenort (fishery and sport harbour)
- Heikendorf
- Kitzeberg
- Mönkeberg
- Neumühlen-Dietrichsdorf (trade harbour "Ostuferhafen")
- Kiel-Wellingdorf (southern mouth of the Schwentine)
- Kiel-Ellerbek (former fishing village, now Arsenal)
- Kiel-Gaarden (Howaldtswerke-Deutsche Werft)
