= Winnemark =

Winnemark Vindemark
- Municipality
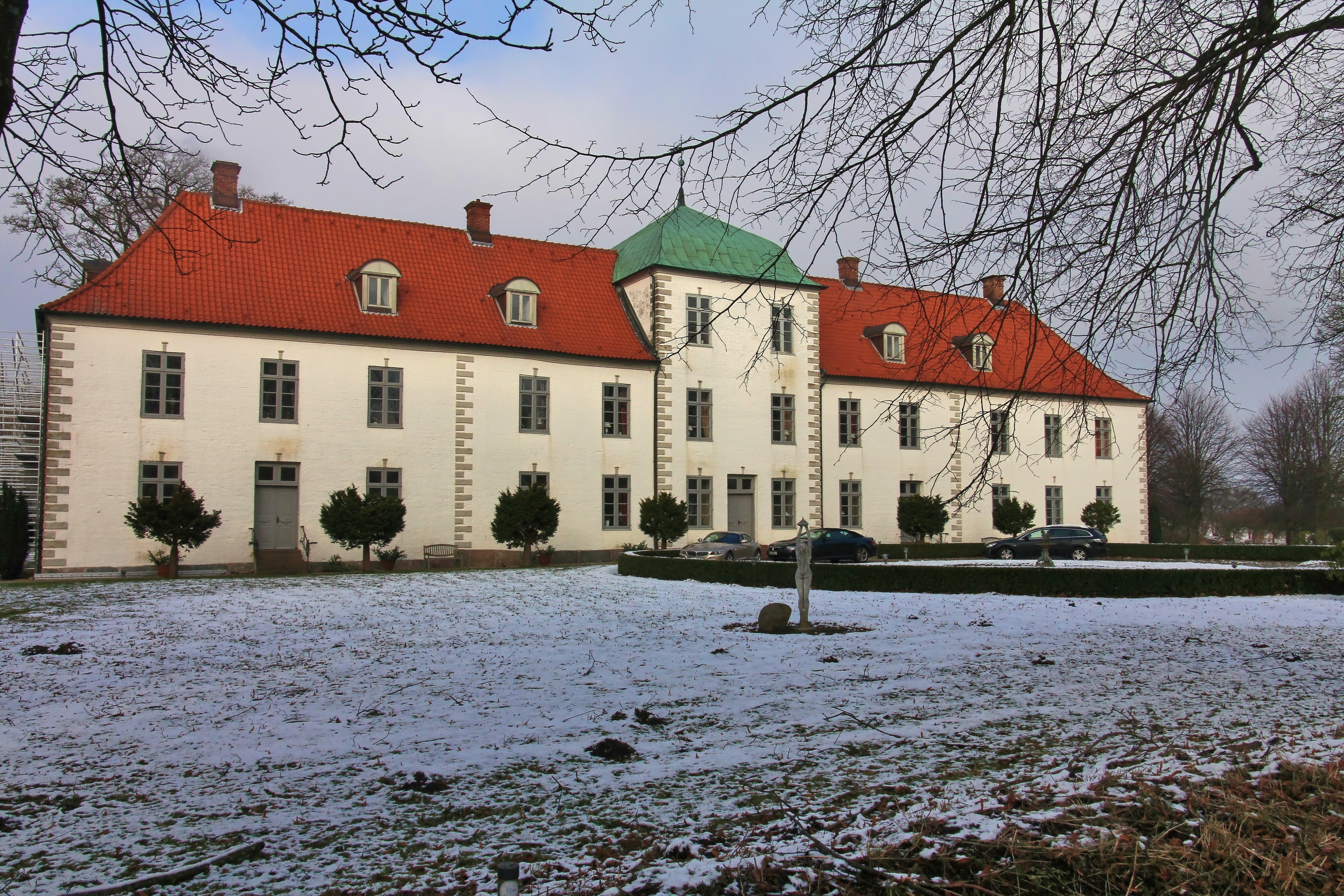

- Coat of arms

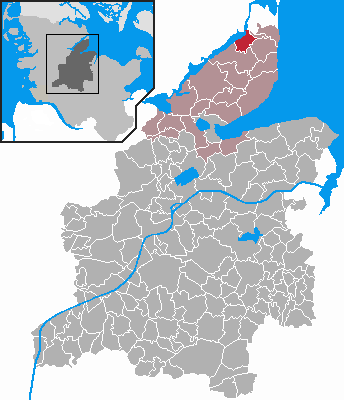
- Location of Winnemark; Vindemark within Rendsburg-Eckernförde district
- Interactive map of Winnemark; Vindemark
- Location within Germany Location within Schleswig-Holstein
- Coordinates: 54°37′N 9°55′E
- Country: Germany
- State: Schleswig-Holstein
- District: Rendsburg-Eckernförde
- Municipal assoc.: Schlei-Ostsee

Government
  - Mayor: Wilhelm Fülling

Area
  - Total: 9.58 km^{2} (3.70 sq mi)
- Elevation: 14 m (46 ft)

Population (2025-12-31)
  - Total: 583
  - Density: 60.9/km^{2} (158/sq mi)
- Time zone: UTC+01:00 (CET)
  - Summer (DST): UTC+02:00 (CEST)
- Postal codes: 24398
- Dialling codes: 04644
- Vehicle registration: RD
- Website: www.amt-schlei- ostsee.de

Winnemark (Danish: Vindemark) is a municipality in the district of Rendsburg-Eckernförde, in Schleswig-Holstein, Germany.
