= Damp, Germany =

Damp
- Municipality
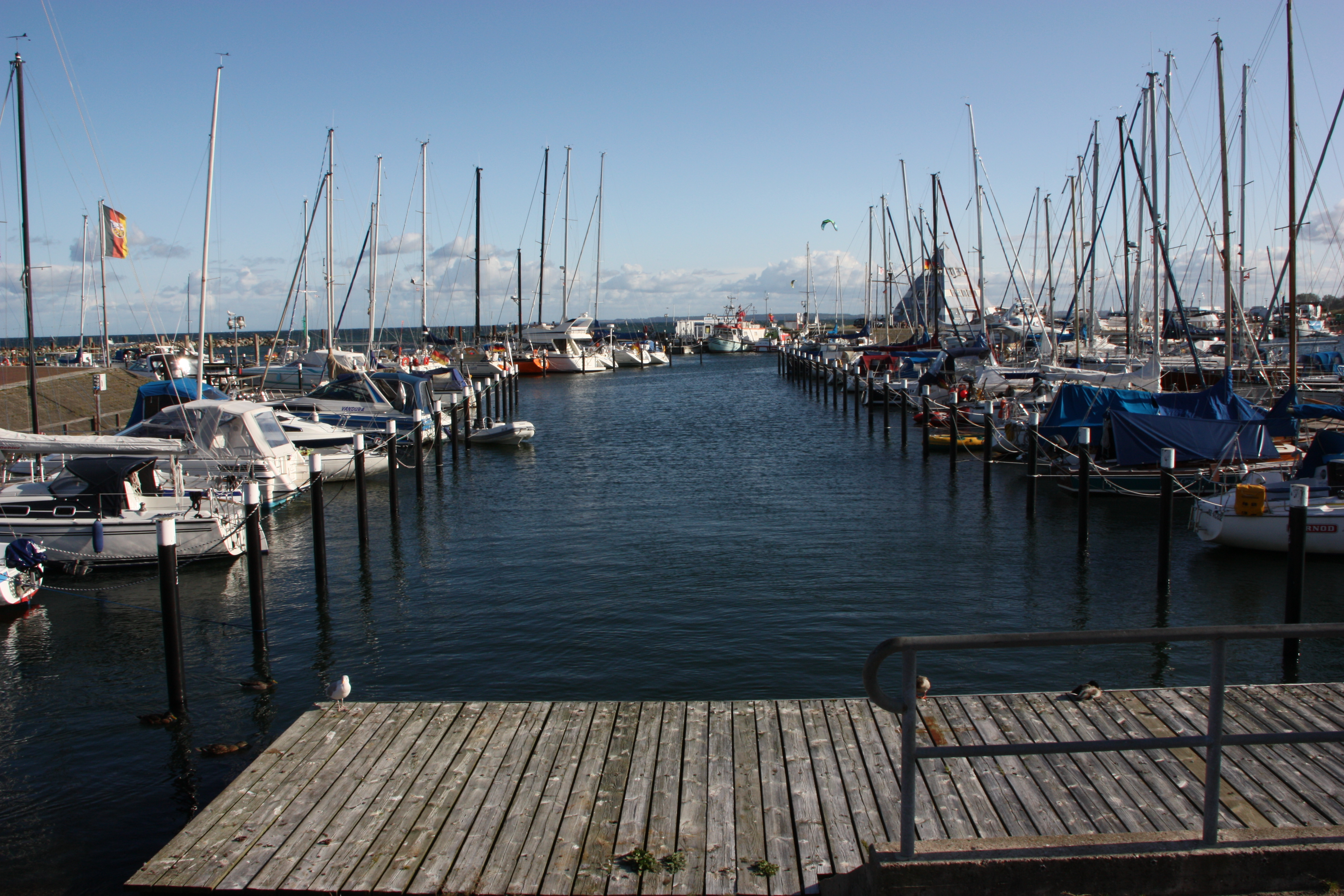
- Boats in the port of Damp in mid-September 2009

- Coat of arms

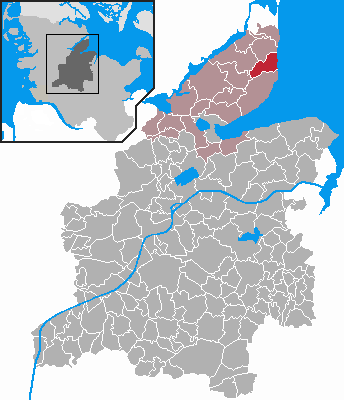
- Location of Damp within Rendsburg-Eckernförde district
- Interactive map of Damp
- Location within Germany Location within Schleswig-Holstein
- Coordinates: 54°34′55″N 10°1′15″E
- Country: Germany
- State: Schleswig-Holstein
- District: Rendsburg-Eckernförde
- Municipal assoc.: Schlei-Ostsee

Government
  - Mayor: Horst Böttcher

Area
  - Total: 13.81 km^{2} (5.33 sq mi)
- Elevation: 16 m (52 ft)

Population (2025-12-31)
  - Total: 1,542
  - Density: 111.7/km^{2} (289.2/sq mi)
- Time zone: UTC+01:00 (CET)
  - Summer (DST): UTC+02:00 (CEST)
- Postal codes: 24351
- Dialling codes: 04352
- Vehicle registration: RD
- Website: amt-schlei-ostsee.de

Damp (German pronunciation: [damp]) is a municipality in the district of Rendsburg-Eckernförde, in Schleswig-Holstein, Germany.
