= Altenhof, Schleswig-Holstein =

Altenhof Oldenhave (Low G.), Celmerstorp (Dan.)
- Municipality
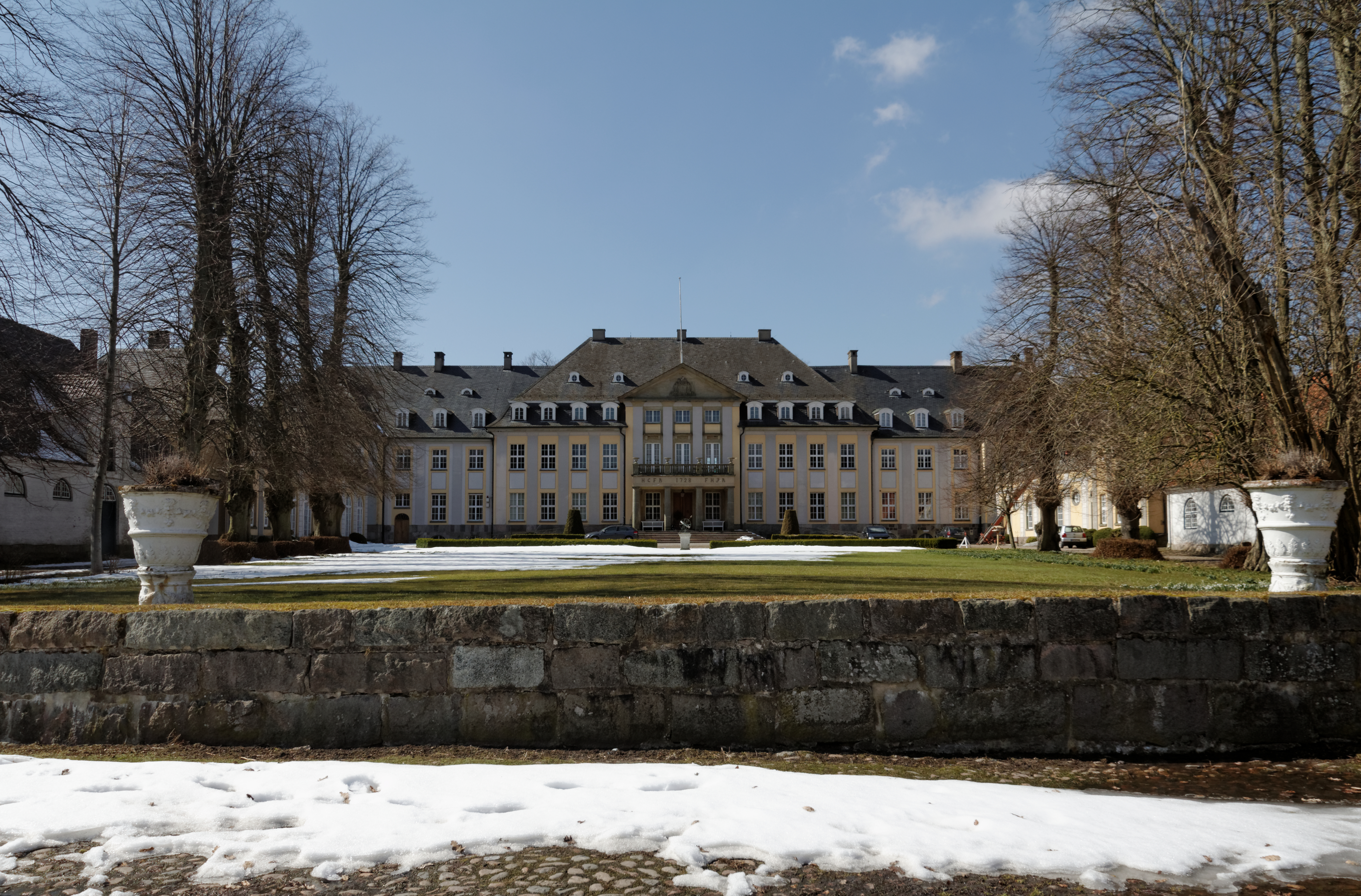

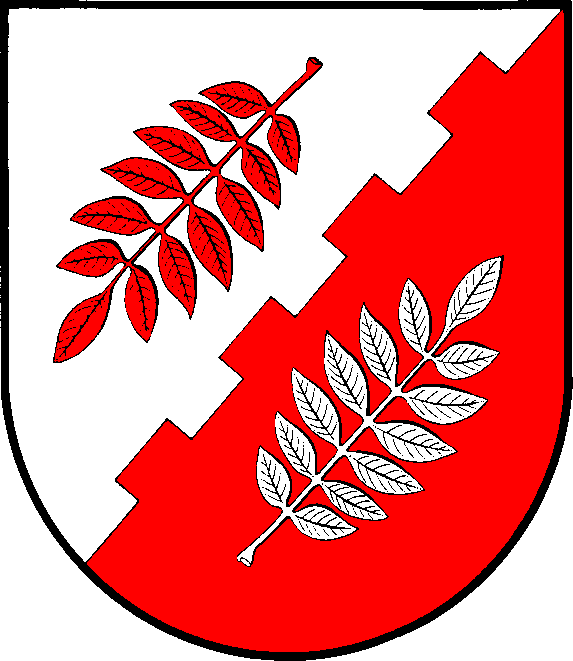
- Coat of arms

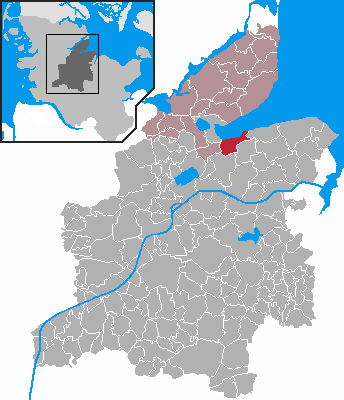
- Location of Altenhof; Oldenhave (Low G.), Celmerstorp (Dan.) within Rendsburg-Eckernförde district
- Interactive map of Altenhof; Oldenhave (Low G.), Celmerstorp (Dan.)
- Location within Germany Location within Schleswig-Holstein
- Coordinates: 54°25′N 9°52′E
- Country: Germany
- State: Schleswig-Holstein
- District: Rendsburg-Eckernförde
- Municipal assoc.: Schlei-Ostsee

Government
  - Mayor: Hilmar Marohn

Area
  - Total: 12.13 km^{2} (4.68 sq mi)
- Elevation: 5 m (16 ft)

Population (2025-12-31)
  - Total: 296
  - Density: 24.4/km^{2} (63.2/sq mi)
- Time zone: UTC+01:00 (CET)
  - Summer (DST): UTC+02:00 (CEST)
- Postal codes: 24340
- Dialling codes: 04351
- Vehicle registration: RD
- Website: www.amt-schlei-ostsee.de

Altenhof (German pronunciation: [ˈaltn̩hoːf]; Low German: Oldenhave; Danish: Celmerstorp) is a municipality in the district of Rendsburg-Eckernförde, in Schleswig-Holstein, Germany.
