= Goosefeld =

- Municipality
- Coat of arms

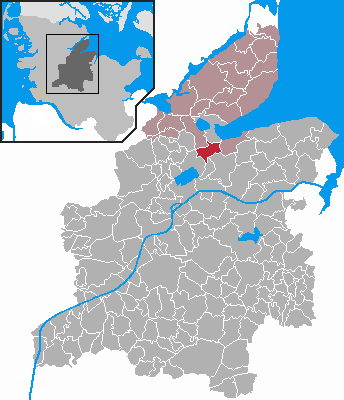
- Location of Goosefeld within Rendsburg-Eckernförde district
- Interactive map of Goosefeld
- Location within Germany Location within Schleswig-Holstein
- Coordinates: 54°26′N 9°49′E
- Country: Germany
- State: Schleswig-Holstein
- District: Rendsburg-Eckernförde
- Municipal assoc.: Schlei-Ostsee

Government
  - Mayor: Rüdiger Zander

Area
  - Total: 9.81 km^{2} (3.79 sq mi)
- Elevation: 0–55 m (0–180 ft)

Population (2025-12-31)
  - Total: 718
  - Density: 73.2/km^{2} (190/sq mi)
- Time zone: UTC+01:00 (CET)
  - Summer (DST): UTC+02:00 (CEST)
- Postal codes: 24340
- Dialling codes: 04351
- Vehicle registration: RD
- Website: www.amt-schlei- ostsee.de

Goosefeld (Danish: Gosefeld or Gosby) is a municipality in the district of Rendsburg-Eckernförde, in Schleswig-Holstein, Germany.

Goosefeld is south of the municipality of Windeby, but north of Groß Wittensee, Haby and Holtsee.
