= Dörphof =

Dörphof Thorpe
- Municipality
- Coat of arms

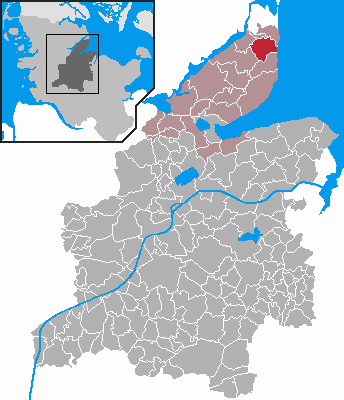
- Location of Dörphof; Thorpe within Rendsburg-Eckernförde district
- Interactive map of Dörphof; Thorpe
- Location within Germany Location within Schleswig-Holstein
- Coordinates: 54°37′N 9°58′E
- Country: Germany
- State: Schleswig-Holstein
- District: Rendsburg-Eckernförde
- Municipal assoc.: Schlei-Ostsee

Government
  - Mayor: Hans-Peter Thomsen

Area
  - Total: 15.02 km^{2} (5.80 sq mi)
- Elevation: 7 m (23 ft)

Population (2025-12-31)
  - Total: 733
  - Density: 48.8/km^{2} (126/sq mi)
- Time zone: UTC+01:00 (CET)
  - Summer (DST): UTC+02:00 (CEST)
- Postal codes: 24398
- Dialling codes: 04644
- Vehicle registration: RD
- Website: www.amt-schlei- ostsee.de

Dörphof (Danish: Dørphof or Thorpe) is a municipality in the district of Rendsburg-Eckernförde, in Schleswig-Holstein, Germany.
