= Thumby, Schleswig-Holstein =

Thumby Tumby
- Municipality
- Coat of arms

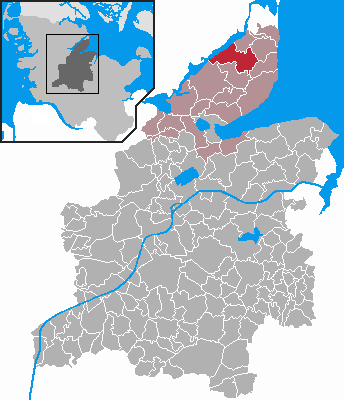
- Location of Thumby; Tumby within Rendsburg-Eckernförde district
- Interactive map of Thumby; Tumby
- Location within Germany Location within Schleswig-Holstein
- Coordinates: 54°34′N 9°55′E
- Country: Germany
- State: Schleswig-Holstein
- District: Rendsburg-Eckernförde
- Municipal assoc.: Schlei-Ostsee

Government
  - Mayor: Christian Rehm

Area
  - Total: 27.39 km^{2} (10.58 sq mi)
- Elevation: 25 m (82 ft)

Population (2025-12-31)
  - Total: 373
  - Density: 13.6/km^{2} (35.3/sq mi)
- Time zone: UTC+01:00 (CET)
  - Summer (DST): UTC+02:00 (CEST)
- Postal codes: 24351
- Dialling codes: 04352, 04355
- Vehicle registration: RD
- Website: www.amt-schlei- ostsee.de

Thumby (Danish: Tumby) is a municipality in the district of Rendsburg-Eckernförde, in Schleswig-Holstein, Germany.
