= Schwansen =

Peninsula in Schleswig-Holstein

Coordinates: 54°34′N 9°54′E

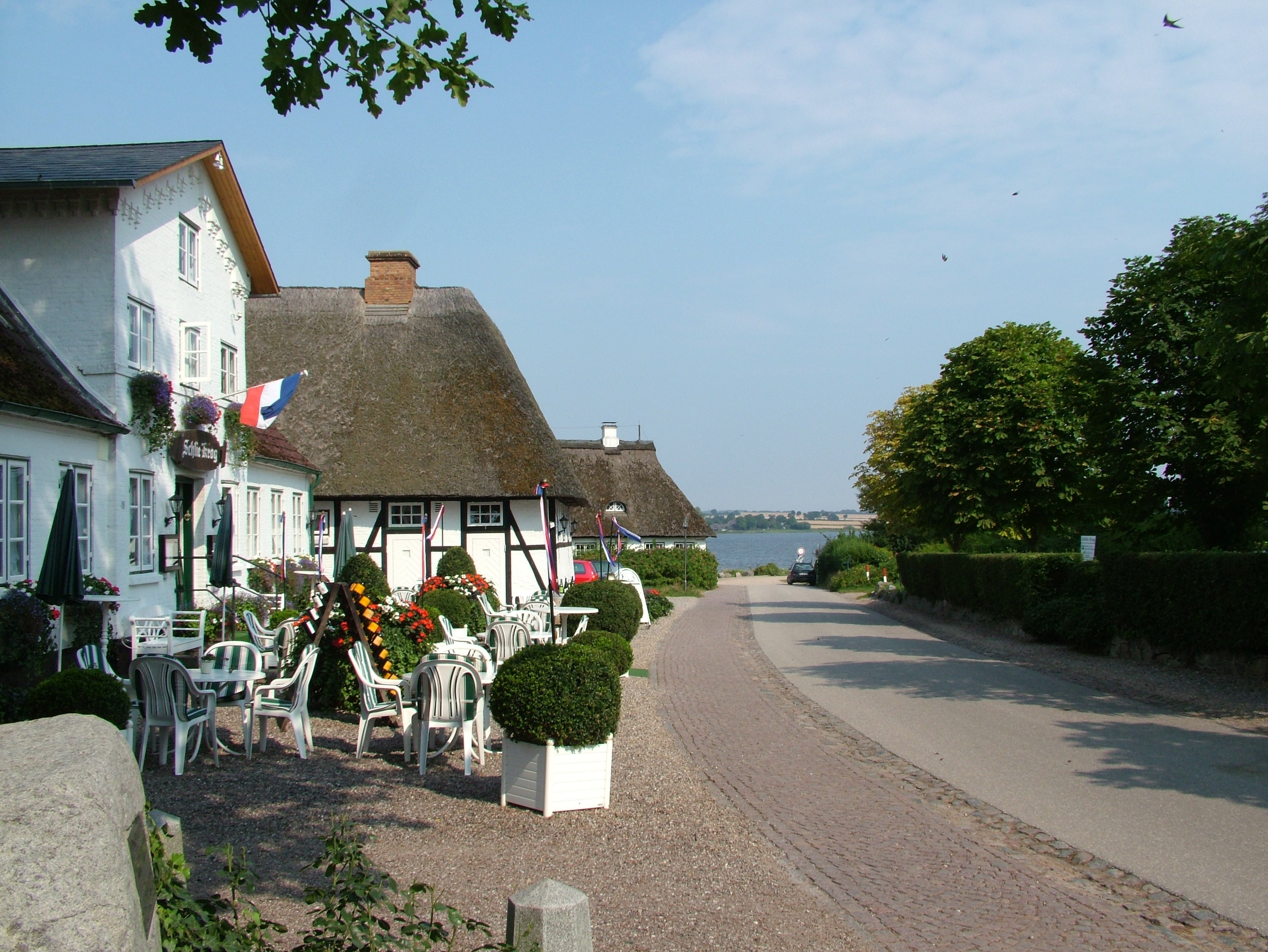
Sieseby, on the Schlei

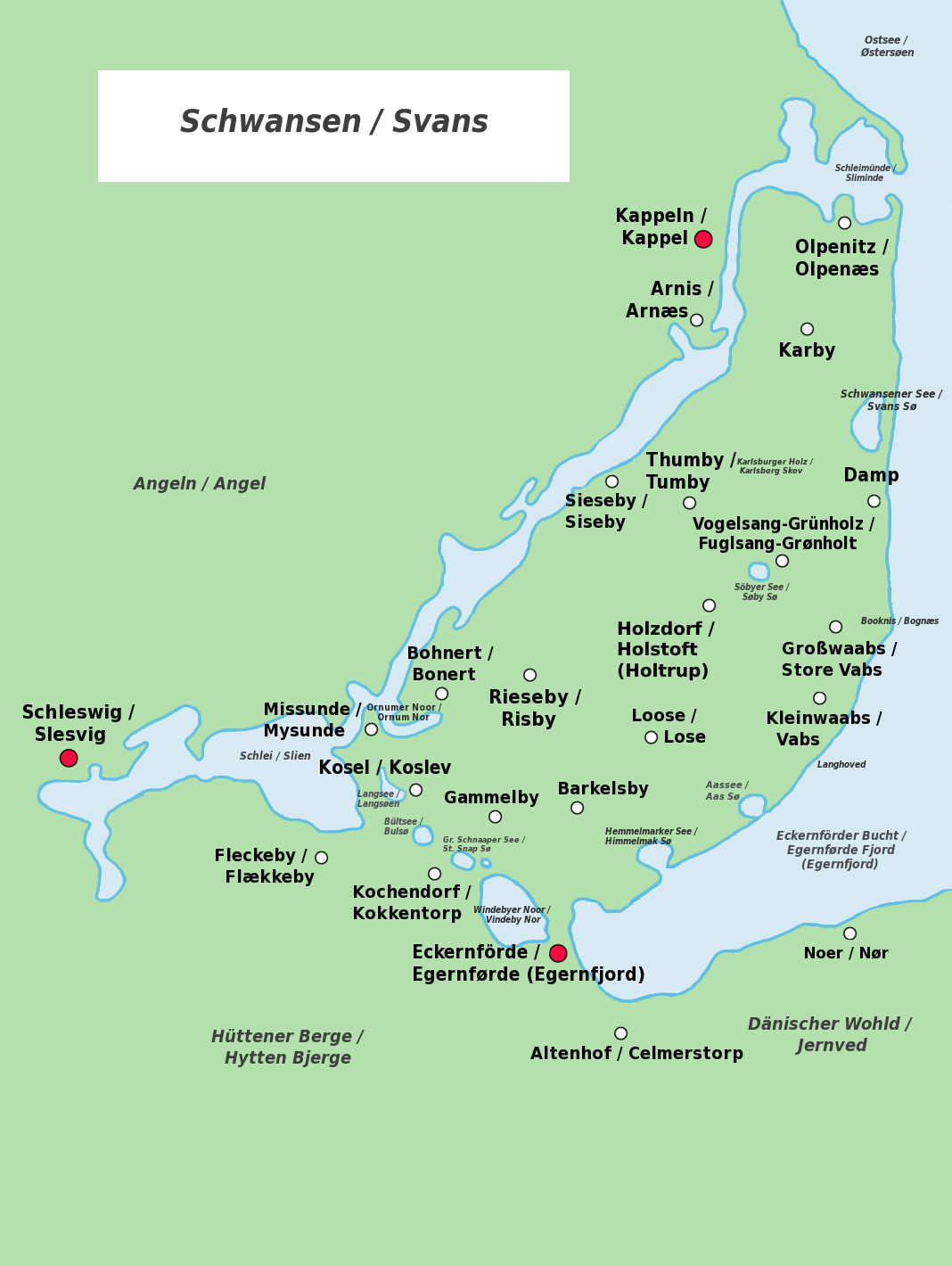
Bilingual map of Schwansen

Schwansen (German pronunciation: [ˈʃvanzn̩]; Danish: Svans or Svansø, meaning "swan island/peninsula") is a peninsula in Schleswig-Holstein, Germany, protruding into the Baltic Sea. It is located between Eckernförde Bay to the south and the Schlei inlet to the north.

The Danish dialect South Jutlandic in the Angel Danish variant was still spoken in Schwansen around 1780 (the last time in the villages near the Schlei). Denmark lost Schwansen following the Second Schleswig War in 1864.

Schwansen is the name of the former Amt ("collective municipality") Schwansen, which covered most of the peninsula. The seat of the Amt was in Damp.
