= Brodersby, Rendsburg-Eckernförde =

Brodersby
- Municipality
- Coat of arms

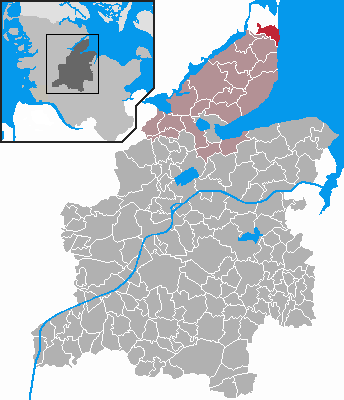
- Location of Brodersby within Rendsburg-Eckernförde district
- Interactive map of Brodersby
- Location within Germany Location within Schleswig-Holstein
- Coordinates: 54°37′N 9°58′E
- Country: Germany
- State: Schleswig-Holstein
- District: Rendsburg-Eckernförde
- Municipal assoc.: Schlei-Ostsee

Government
  - Mayor: Dieter Olma

Area
  - Total: 9.79 km^{2} (3.78 sq mi)
- Elevation: 17 m (56 ft)

Population (2025-12-31)
  - Total: 698
  - Density: 71.3/km^{2} (185/sq mi)
- Time zone: UTC+01:00 (CET)
  - Summer (DST): UTC+02:00 (CEST)
- Postal codes: 24398
- Dialling codes: 04644
- Vehicle registration: RD
- Website: www.amt-schlei- ostsee.de

Brodersby (German pronunciation: [ˈbʁoːdɐsbyː]) is a municipality in the district of Rendsburg-Eckernförde, in Schleswig-Holstein, Germany.

== History ==
Brodersby and Höxmark were first mentioned in 1268. In 1876 Brodersby became an independent rural municipality of Rendsburg-Eckernförde.

== Geography and Transport ==
The Ostseebad Schönhagen with a sandy beach and its steep coast is the largest place in the municipality. In addition, Brodersby, Dingelby, Drasberg, Höxmark (Danish: Høgsmark ), Langacker ( Langager ), Lückeberg and Nübbelfeld ( Nybølmark ) belong to it. The localities Nordhusene and Kikut ( Kikud ) have meanwhile opened up in the Schönhagen district. To the west is the Schwansenstraßefrom Kappeln to Eckernförde, in the south the community extends to Schwansener See.

== Climate ==
Climate data for Schönhagen (1991–2020 normals)
| Month | Jan | Feb | Mar | Apr | May | Jun | Jul | Aug | Sep | Oct | Nov | Dec | Year |
|---|---|---|---|---|---|---|---|---|---|---|---|---|---|
| Mean daily maximum °C (°F) | 4.4 (39.9) | 4.3 (39.7) | 7.1 (44.8) | 11.2 (52.2) | 15.6 (60.1) | 19.1 (66.4) | 21.4 (70.5) | 21.0 (69.8) | 17.8 (64.0) | 13.1 (55.6) | 8.7 (47.7) | 5.5 (41.9) | 12.5 (54.5) |
| Daily mean °C (°F) | 2.3 (36.1) | 2.3 (36.1) | 4.3 (39.7) | 7.6 (45.7) | 11.7 (53.1) | 15.2 (59.4) | 17.5 (63.5) | 17.4 (63.3) | 14.8 (58.6) | 10.8 (51.4) | 6.7 (44.1) | 3.7 (38.7) | 9.5 (49.1) |
| Mean daily minimum °C (°F) | 0.3 (32.5) | 0.2 (32.4) | 1.6 (34.9) | 4.1 (39.4) | 7.7 (45.9) | 11.2 (52.2) | 13.3 (55.9) | 13.7 (56.7) | 11.2 (52.2) | 8.1 (46.6) | 4.4 (39.9) | 1.7 (35.1) | 6.3 (43.3) |
| Average precipitation mm (inches) | 133.6 (5.26) | 104.1 (4.10) | 106.0 (4.17) | 73.4 (2.89) | 96.5 (3.80) | 90.9 (3.58) | 129.9 (5.11) | 96.2 (3.79) | 111.0 (4.37) | 110.9 (4.37) | 119.7 (4.71) | 142.5 (5.61) | 1,313.3 (51.70) |
| Average relative humidity (%) | 89.5 | 86.4 | 85.1 | 81.7 | 81.1 | 81.1 | 81.1 | 83.3 | 84.4 | 86.0 | 89.1 | 89.7 | 84.9 |
| Mean monthly sunshine hours | 42.4 | 64.4 | 132.2 | 220.8 | 253.2 | 245.0 | 239.7 | 210.9 | 167.4 | 111.4 | 55.9 | 34.2 | 1,769.9 |
Source: World Meteorological Organization

== Politics ==
=== Community Council ===
Of the nine seats in the municipal council, the CDU had five seats since the local elections in 2003 and the SPD had four.

Of the nine seats in the municipal council, the CDU had six seats since the 2008 local elections and the SPD three.

Of the twelve seats in the municipal council, the CDU has had six seats since the local elections in Schleswig-Holstein on May 26, 2013, the SPD three and the voting community "Democratic Initiative" also has three seats.

== Coat of arms ==
Blazon: "In gold, a raised, curved blue tip. At the top right a three-leaved green oak branch, at the top left three fanned green ears. At the bottom a silver swan over five silver wavy threads."

== Economy ==
Agriculture is one of the main industries of Brodersby, in addition to agriculture, tourism is an important source of income, especially in Schönhagen with its spa center and hotels.

== Schloss Schönhagen ==
Castle Schönhagen was created in 1711 near a farm in Höxmark. The eponymous manor district existed until 1928.

Built in 1889 by the Hanseatic Nobleman Hermann Jauch, it was used as his primary residence until his death, today the castle is used as a rehabilitation clinic.

== Pictures ==
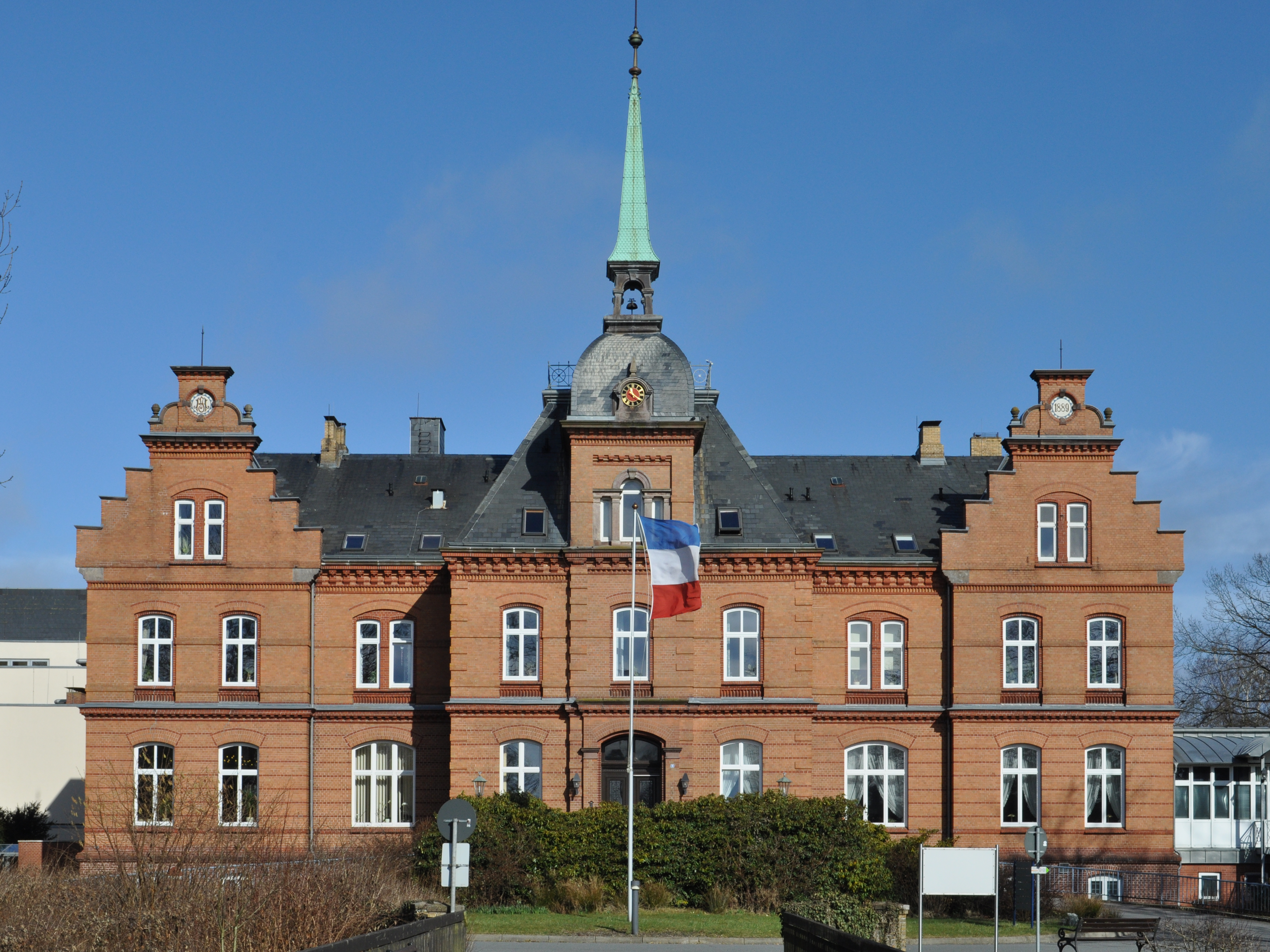
Schloss Schönhagen

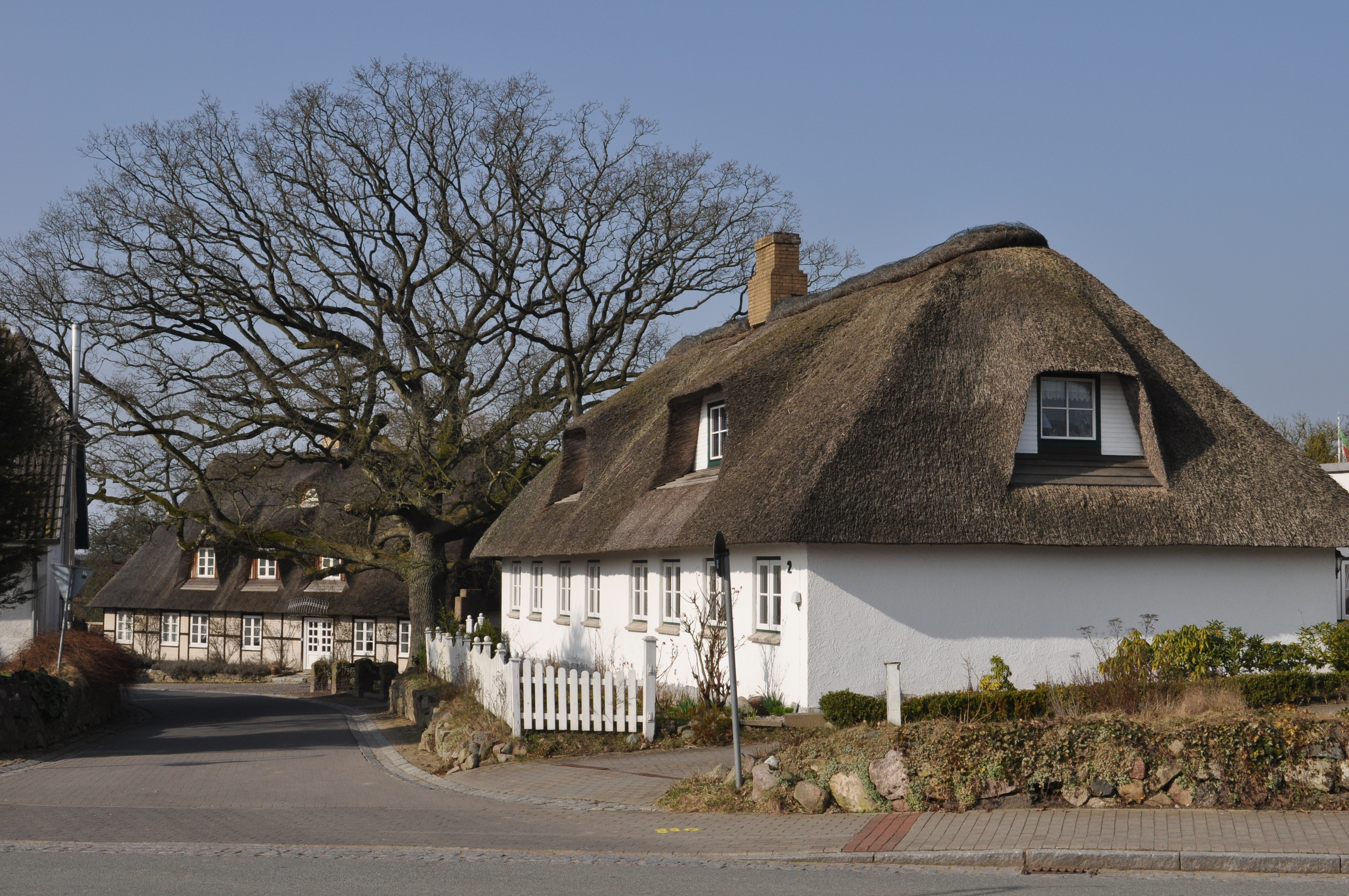
Street in Brodersby

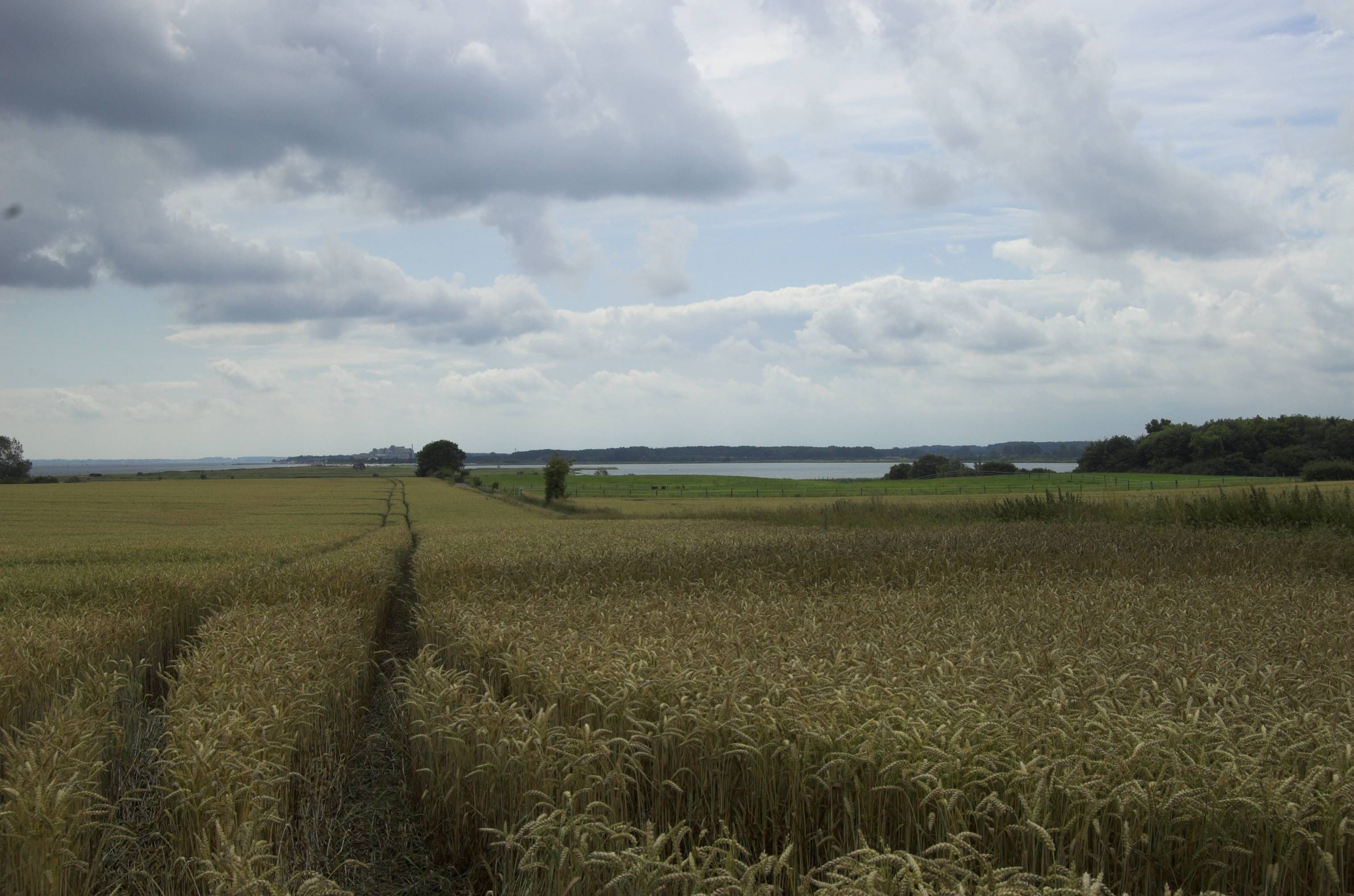
Schwansener See

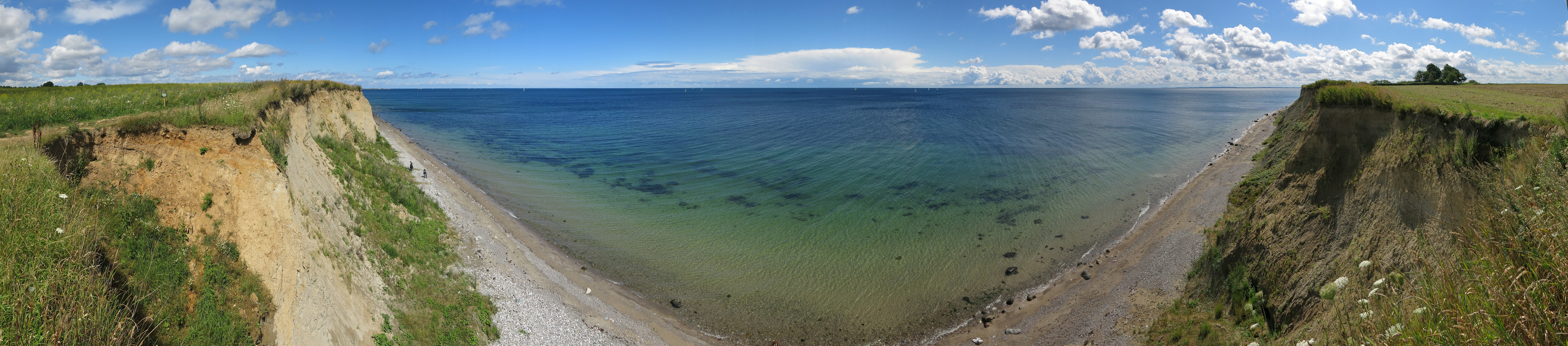
View from the top of a cliff in Schönhagen

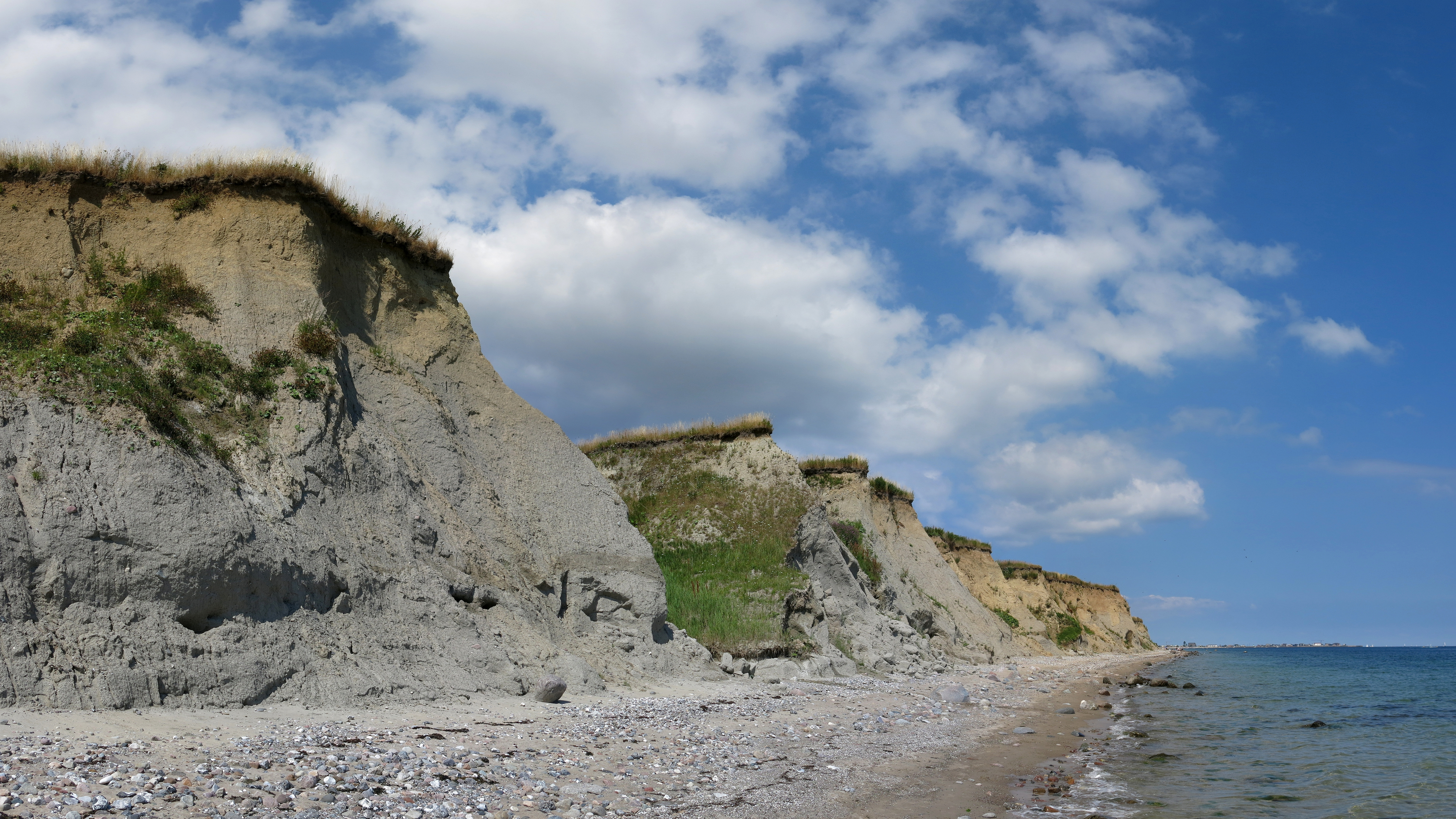
Cliff Schönhagen
