= Dänischer Wohld =

Coordinates: 54°25′N 10°4′E

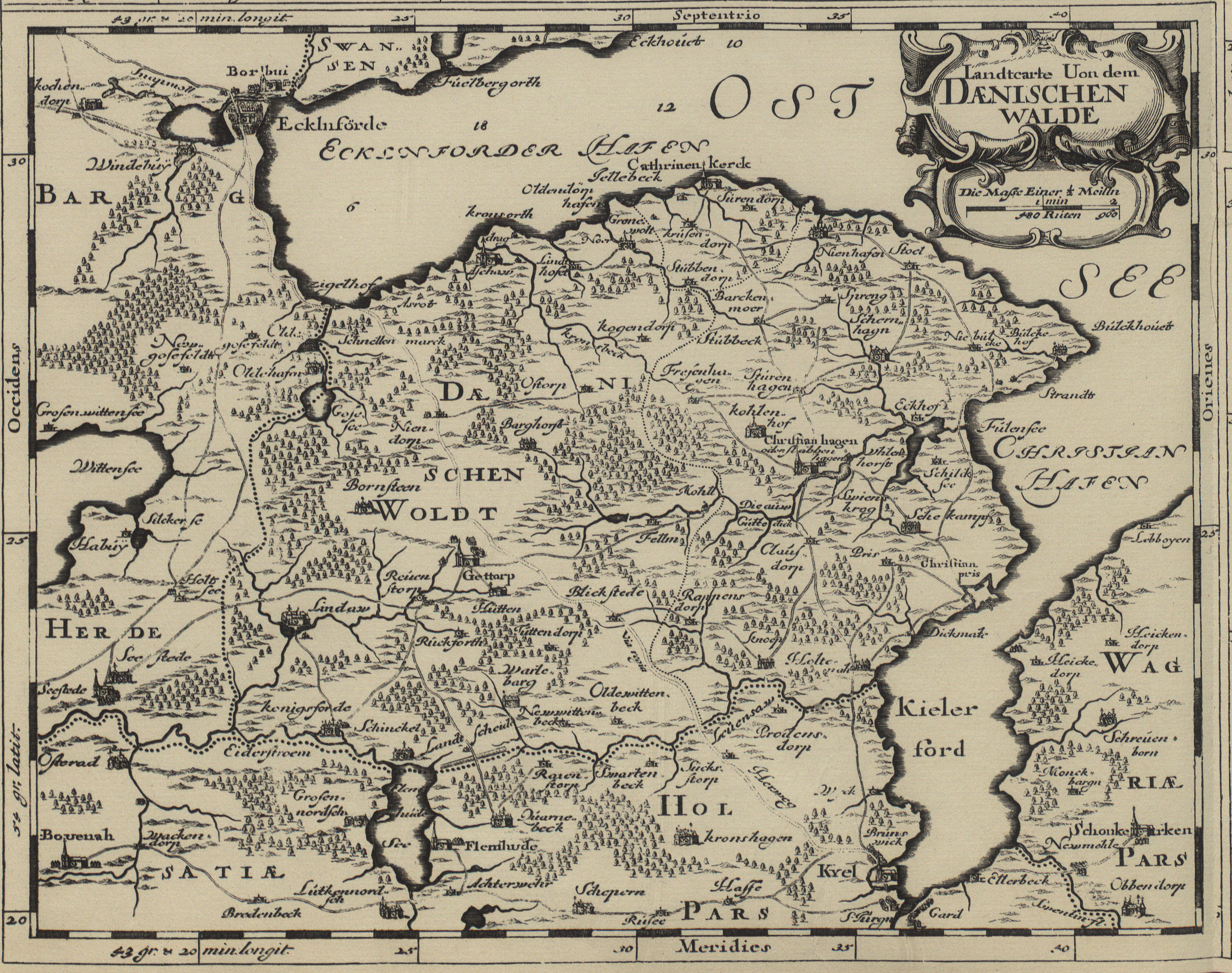
1652 map of the Dänischer Wohld

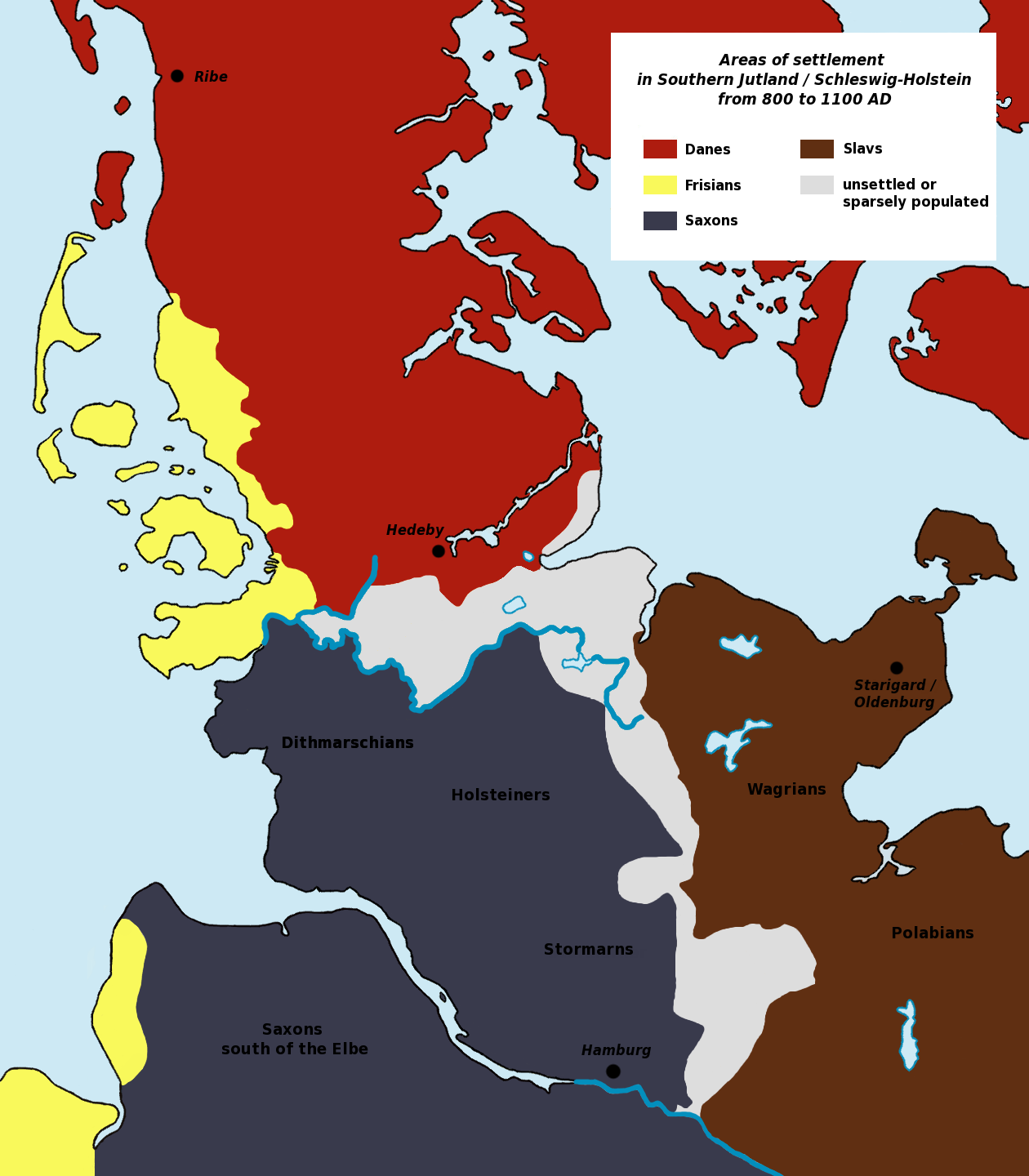
The Dänischer Wohld formed a border forest between Danish and North German settlements.

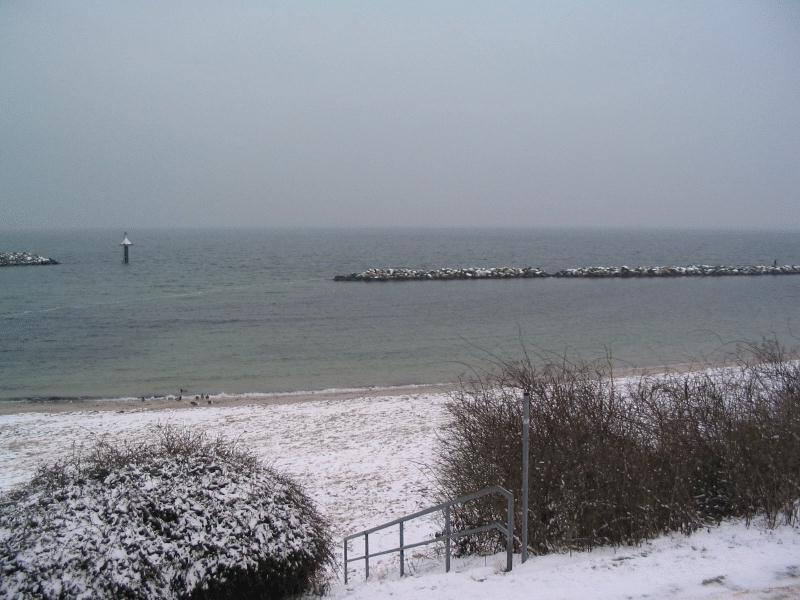
Beach in Kiel's Schilksee

The Dänischer Wohld (Danish: Jernved) is a peninsula in Schleswig-Holstein, Germany. It is located between Eckernförde Bay in the north and Kiel Fjord in the south. The Amt of "Dänischer Wohld" in the district of Rendsburg-Eckernförde is named after the peninsula, but only encompasses a central part of the region.

The Dänischer Wohld formed a border forest between German and Danish settlements in the Middle Ages with only a few Jute settlements. After 1260 the Dänischer Wohld was pledged by the Danish king to the north German nobility and German colonists settled in the region. The Dänischer Wohld was in the Middle Ages part of Denmark and after 1200 of the Danish Duchy of Schleswig, where it formed its own goods district. After the Second Schleswig War 1864 the region came to Prussia.

The southern Dänischer Wohld is bordered by the Kiel Canal and remnants of the Eider Canal. It predominantly was composed of the older Eckernförde district, now within Rendsburg-Eckernförde. The main settlement of the region is Gettorf. Individual settlements in the southeast, such as Schilksee, Holtenau, and Friedrichsort, now are part of the city of Kiel.
