= Barkelsby =

- Municipality
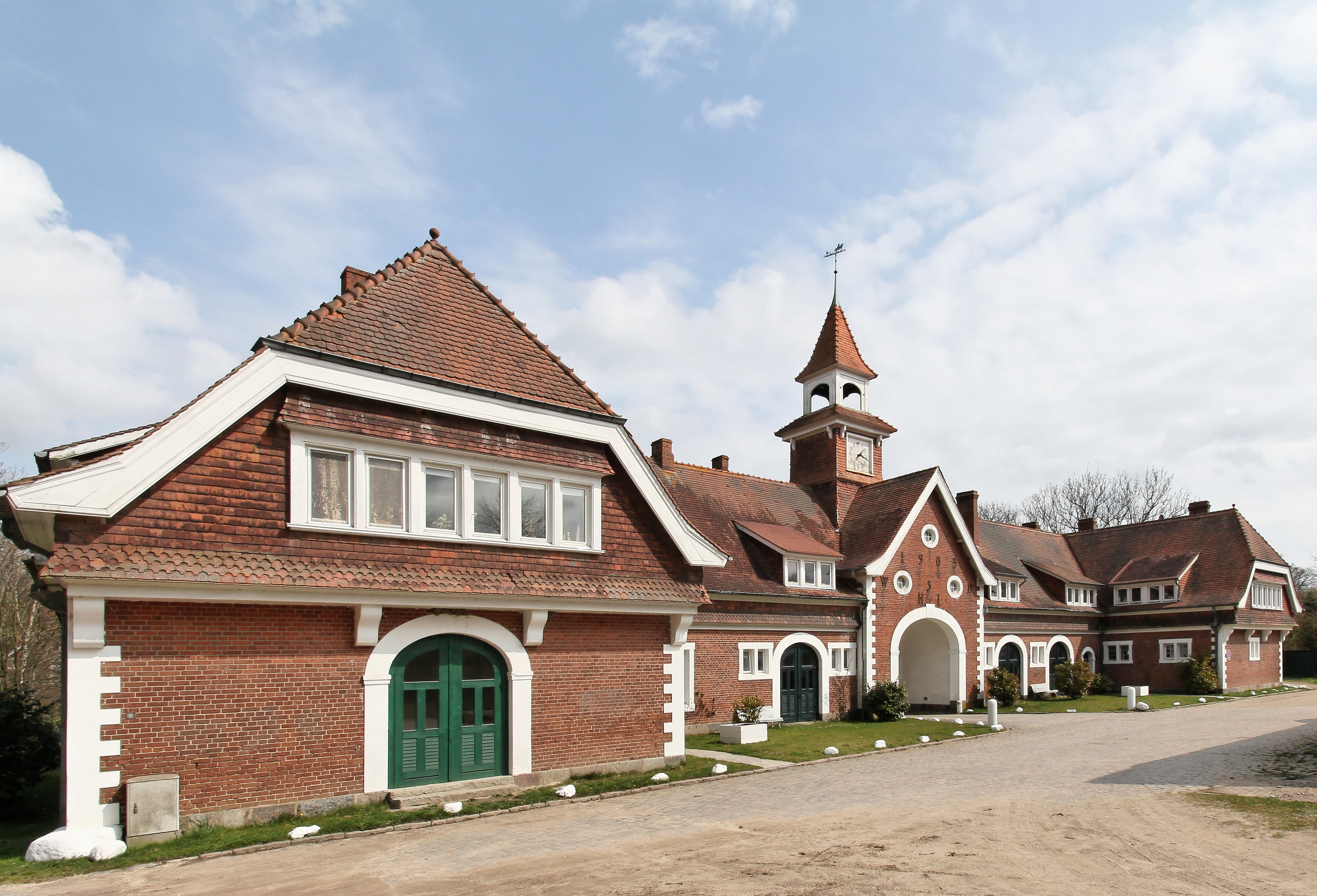

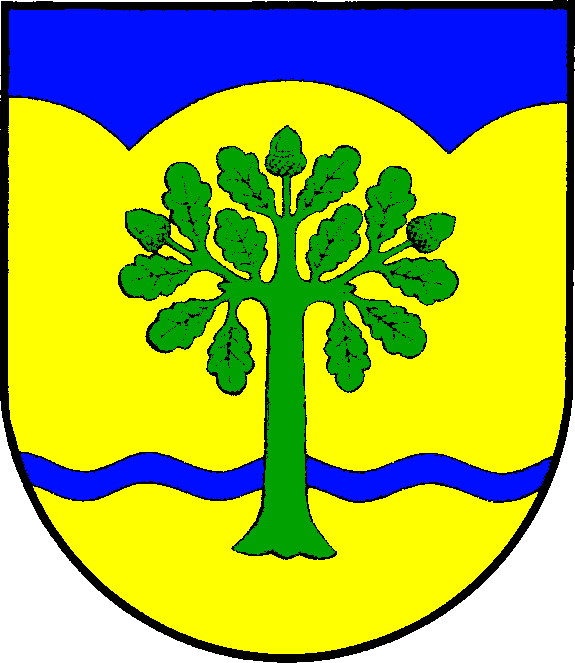
- Coat of arms

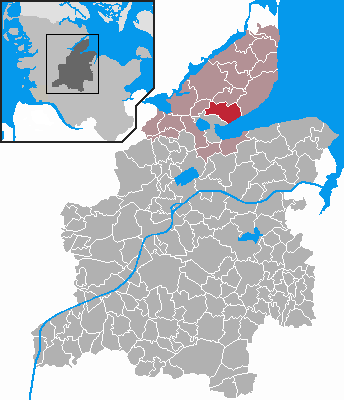
- Location of Barkelsby within Rendsburg-Eckernförde district
- Interactive map of Barkelsby
- Location within Germany Location within Schleswig-Holstein
- Coordinates: 54°30′11″N 9°50′12″E
- Country: Germany
- State: Schleswig-Holstein
- District: Rendsburg-Eckernförde
- Municipal assoc.: Schlei-Ostsee

Government
  - Mayor: Wolf-Dieter Ohrt

Area
  - Total: 17.87 km^{2} (6.90 sq mi)
- Elevation: 22 m (72 ft)

Population (2025-12-31)
  - Total: 1,532
  - Density: 85.73/km^{2} (222.0/sq mi)
- Time zone: UTC+01:00 (CET)
  - Summer (DST): UTC+02:00 (CEST)
- Postal codes: 24360
- Dialling codes: 04351
- Vehicle registration: RD
- Website: www.amt-schlei- ostsee.de

Barkelsby (Danish: Barkelsby) is a municipality in the district of Rendsburg-Eckernförde, in Schleswig-Holstein, Germany.
