= Loose, Germany =

Loose Lose
- Municipality
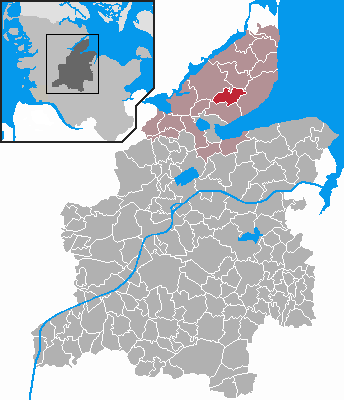
- Location of Loose; Lose within Rendsburg-Eckernförde district
- Interactive map of Loose; Lose
- Location within Germany Location within Schleswig-Holstein
- Coordinates: 54°31′N 9°53′E
- Country: Germany
- State: Schleswig-Holstein
- District: Rendsburg-Eckernförde
- Municipal assoc.: Schlei-Ostsee

Government
  - Mayor: Gerhard Feige

Area
  - Total: 13.11 km^{2} (5.06 sq mi)
- Elevation: 23 m (75 ft)

Population (2025-12-31)
  - Total: 905
  - Density: 69.0/km^{2} (179/sq mi)
- Time zone: UTC+01:00 (CET)
  - Summer (DST): UTC+02:00 (CEST)
- Postal codes: 24366
- Dialling codes: 04358
- Vehicle registration: RD
- Website: www.amt-schlei- ostsee.de

Loose (German pronunciation: [ˈloːzə]; Danish: Lose) is a municipality in the district of Rendsburg-Eckernförde, in Schleswig-Holstein, Germany.
