= Karby, Schleswig-Holstein =

- Municipality
- Coat of arms

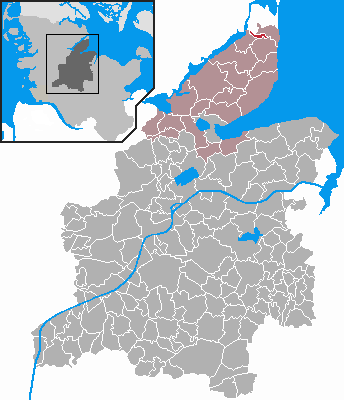
- Location of Karby, Schleswig-Holstein within Rendsburg-Eckernförde district
- Interactive map of Karby, Schleswig-Holstein
- Location within Germany Location within Schleswig-Holstein
- Coordinates: 54°37′N 9°58′E
- Country: Germany
- State: Schleswig-Holstein
- District: Rendsburg-Eckernförde
- Municipal assoc.: Schlei-Ostsee

Government
  - Mayor: Thomas Becker

Area
  - Total: 2.09 km^{2} (0.81 sq mi)
- Elevation: 5 m (16 ft)

Population (2025-12-31)
  - Total: 526
  - Density: 252/km^{2} (652/sq mi)
- Time zone: UTC+01:00 (CET)
  - Summer (DST): UTC+02:00 (CEST)
- Postal codes: 24398
- Dialling codes: 04644
- Vehicle registration: RD
- Website: www.amt-schlei- ostsee.de

Karby is a municipality in the district of Rendsburg-Eckernförde, in Schleswig-Holstein, Germany.
