= Holzdorf =

Holzdorf Holstoft
- Municipality
- Coat of arms

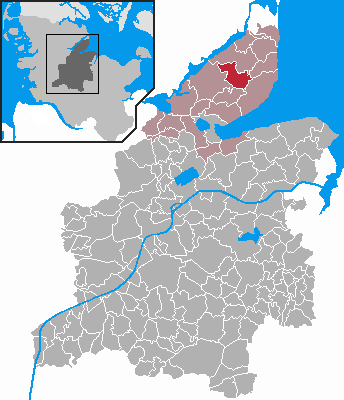
- Location of Holzdorf; Holstoft within Rendsburg-Eckernförde district
- Interactive map of Holzdorf; Holstoft
- Location within Germany Location within Schleswig-Holstein
- Coordinates: 54°32′N 9°52′E
- Country: Germany
- State: Schleswig-Holstein
- District: Rendsburg-Eckernförde
- Municipal assoc.: Schlei-Ostsee

Government
  - Mayor: Sylvia Green-Meschke

Area
  - Total: 17.35 km^{2} (6.70 sq mi)
- Elevation: 24 m (79 ft)

Population (2025-12-31)
  - Total: 857
  - Density: 49.4/km^{2} (128/sq mi)
- Time zone: UTC+01:00 (CET)
  - Summer (DST): UTC+02:00 (CEST)
- Postal codes: 24364
- Dialling codes: 04352
- Vehicle registration: RD
- Website: www.amt-schlei- ostsee.de

Holzdorf (Danish: Holstoft, Holtrup) is a municipality in the district of Rendsburg-Eckernförde, in Schleswig-Holstein, Germany.
