= Waabs =

Waabs Vabs or Vabenæs
- Municipality
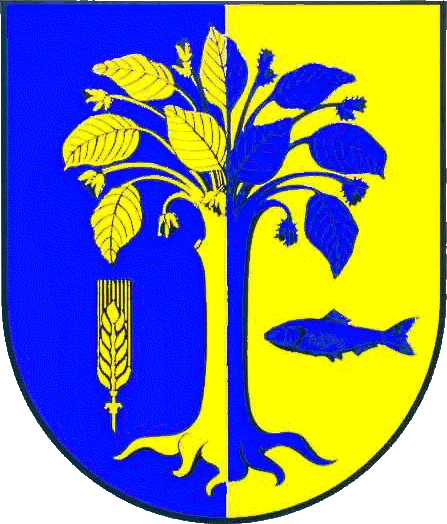
- Coat of arms

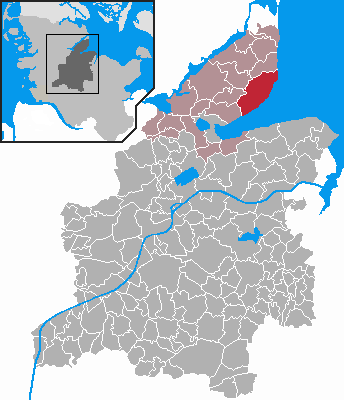
- Location of Waabs; Vabs or Vabenæs within Rendsburg-Eckernförde district
- Interactive map of Waabs; Vabs or Vabenæs
- Location within Germany Location within Schleswig-Holstein
- Coordinates: 54°31′N 9°58′E
- Country: Germany
- State: Schleswig-Holstein
- District: Rendsburg-Eckernförde
- Municipal assoc.: Schlei-Ostsee

Government
  - Mayor: Udo Steinacker (CDU)

Area
  - Total: 33.27 km^{2} (12.85 sq mi)
- Elevation: 31 m (102 ft)

Population (2025-12-31)
  - Total: 1,444
  - Density: 43.40/km^{2} (112.4/sq mi)
- Time zone: UTC+01:00 (CET)
  - Summer (DST): UTC+02:00 (CEST)
- Postal codes: 24369
- Dialling codes: 04352, 04358
- Vehicle registration: RD
- Website: www.amt-schlei- ostsee.de

Waabs (Danish: Vabs or Vabenæs) is a municipality in the district of Rendsburg-Eckernförde, in Schleswig-Holstein, Germany.
