= Schlei =

Inlet of the Baltic Sea in Schleswig-Holstein, Germany

Coordinates: 54.59°N 9.83°E

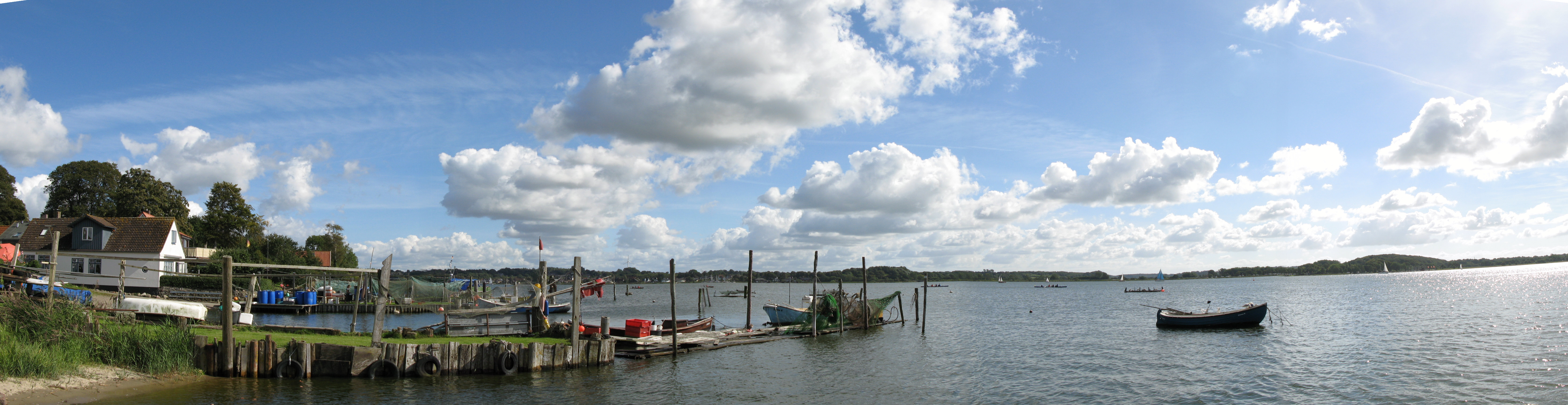
Schlei in the village of Holm, Schleswig

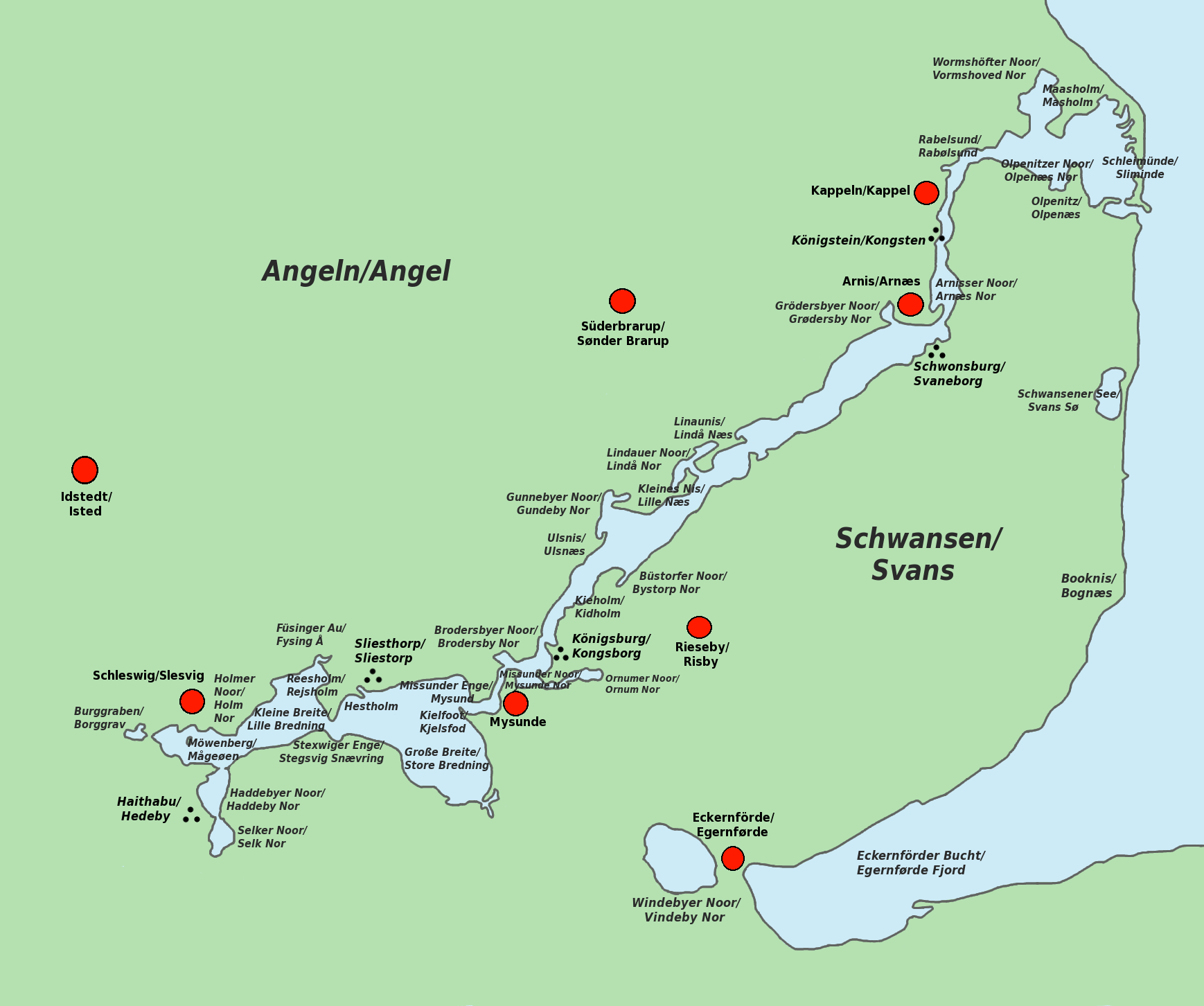
Bilingual map of the Schlei (German and Danish placenames)

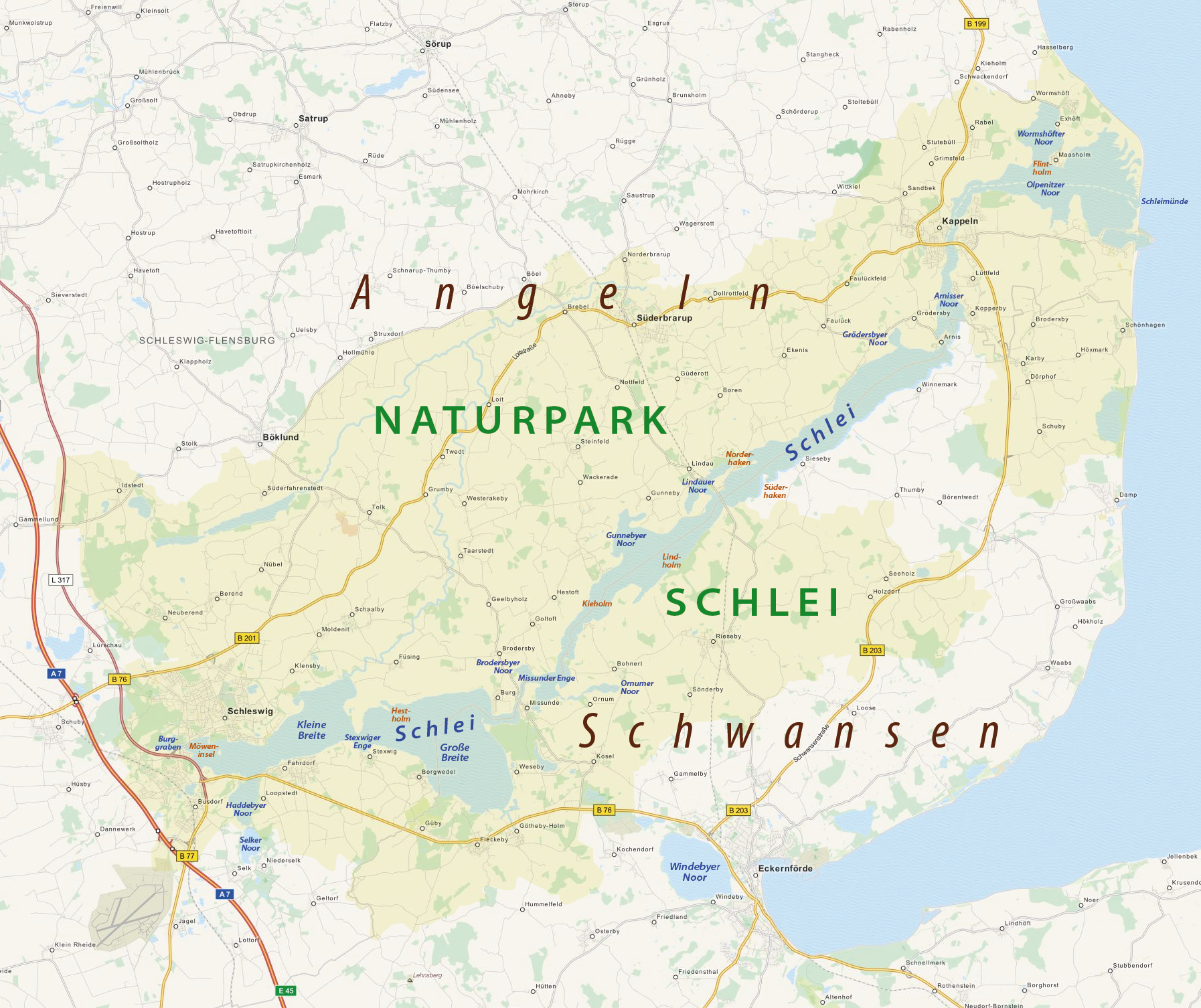
Schlei nature park

The Schlei (German: [ʃlaɪ]; Danish: Slien or Slesvig Fjord) is a narrow inlet of the Baltic Sea in Schleswig-Holstein in northern Germany. It stretches for approximately 20 miles (32 kilometers) from the Baltic near Kappeln and Arnis to the town of Schleswig. Along the Schlei are many small bays and swamps. It separates the Angeln peninsula to the north from the Schwansen peninsula to the south.

The important Viking settlement of Hedeby was located at the head of the firth (fjord), but was later abandoned in favor of the town of Schleswig. A museum has been built on the site, telling the story of the abandoned town.

== Etymology ==
The Schlei's name was once presumably Angel, later giving its name to the region Angeln. This name derives from the Norse word angr ("narrow"). Angel therefore meant "narrow fjord", which fits the long and narrow Schlei well.

The current name is thought to have been used only for the inner Schlei (the broads at the top of the firth now known in Danish as the Store Bredning and Lille Bredning and in German as the Große Breite and Kleine Breite, near Schleswig). The word is thought to be connected with the Danish word slæ ("reeds, water plants").
