= Kiel-Hassee CITTI-PARK station =

Railway station in Kiel, Germany

Kiel Hassee CITTI-PARK
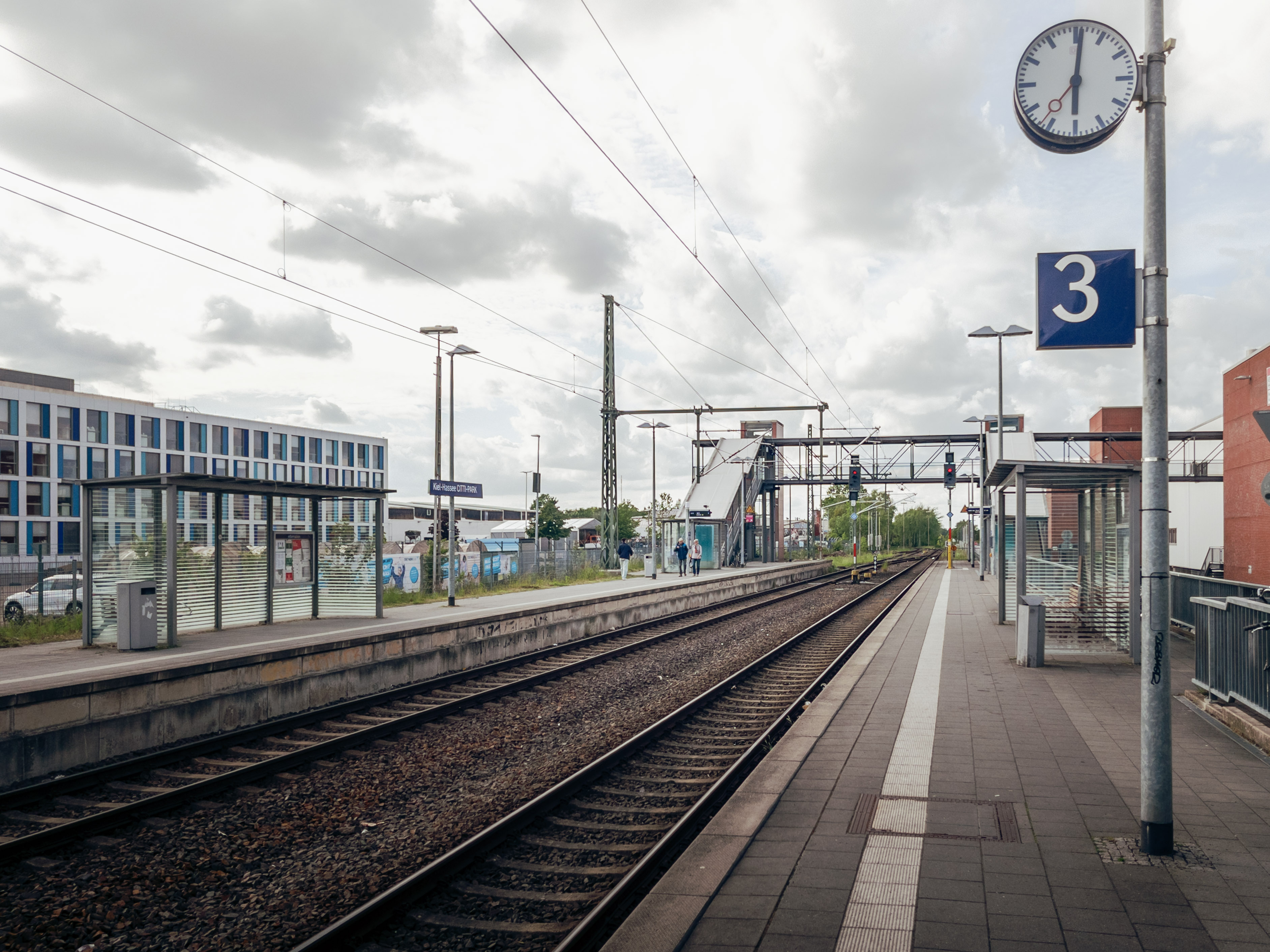

General information
- Location: Altenrade, Kiel, Schleswig-Holstein; Germany
- Coordinates: 54°18′40″N 10°05′53″E
- Owner: Deutsche Bahn
- Operator: DB Station&Service
- Lines: Kiel–Flensburg (KBS 146); Kiel–Rendsburg (KBS 134); Kiel-Hassee–Kiel West (dismantled)
- Platforms: 2
- Tracks: 2

Construction
- Accessible: Yes

Other information
- Station code: 8156
- DS100 code: AKH
- IBNR: 8003474
- Category: 6
- Website: www.bahnhof.de

History
- Opened: 1881; 2007
- Closed: 1981

Services
Preceding station		Following station
Felde towards Husum	RE 74	Kiel Hbf Terminus
Kronshagen towards Rieseby Schleibrücke Süd	RB 73	Kiel Hbf Terminus
Kiel-Russee towards Rendsburg	RB 75	Kiel Hbf Terminus
Location

Kiel-Hassee CITTI PARK station is a station in the Kiel district Hassee in the German state of Schleswig-Holstein. It is on the Kiel–Flensburg and the Rendsburg–Kiel railways. It is classified by Deutsche Bahn as a category 6 station. The station was reactivated in 2007 under a so-called public-private partnership project in passenger transport. The cost was contributed in one-third shares by the state of Schleswig-Holstein, the city of Kiel and the CITTI PARK shopping centre.

== History ==
The Kiel–Flensburg railway was opened in 1881. A station was built at the then still independent village of Hassee. The importance of the station grew with the construction of the line to Rendsburg, which was opened on 15 October 1904. A freight line to the Kiel West freight yard, which linked to factories in the west of the city, was connected here in 1924. Originally, the line ran to Holtenau. Passenger services to the station were abandoned in 1981. The route to Kiel West was closed in 1993 and the points at the junction were removed in 2008.

In 2007, passenger services were resumed to Kiel-Hassee, although the new platforms lies about 250 metres north of the old platform. Some railway tracks have been dismantled and only two continuous tracks are now available. In the south, all the points have been removed as far as the crossover at the station entrance, a storage siding and a factory siding still exist. South of the station separate tracks now run to Kiel Hauptbahnhof and to Kiel-Meimersdorf marshalling yard, but run parallel for some distance.

The former station building still exists and is used as a youth club operated by the city of Kiel.

Maschinenfabrik August G. Koch, a manufacturer of tank wagons was located at Kiel-Hassee station. It had its own locomotives work. The heritage-listed workshop of the machinery factory, built in 1939/40, was demolished for the construction of the shopping centre.

== Rail services ==
The station is served hourly on weekdays by Regionalbahn services running between Kiel and Eckernförde (RB 73) and between Kiel and Rendsburg (RB 75). In the 2026 timetable, the following services stop at the station:

Train class	Route	Frequency
RB 73	Kiel Hauptbahnhof – Kiel-Hassee CITTI-PARK – Suchsdorf – Gettorf – Eckernförde	Hourly
RB 75	Kiel Hauptbahnhof – Kiel-Hassee CITTI-PARK – Rendsburg	Hourly

The new station has two 160 metre-long side platforms, which can be reached via a pedestrian overpass connected by stairs and lifts. The overpass leads directly to the shopping centre.
