= Kleiner Feigling =

Fig liquor

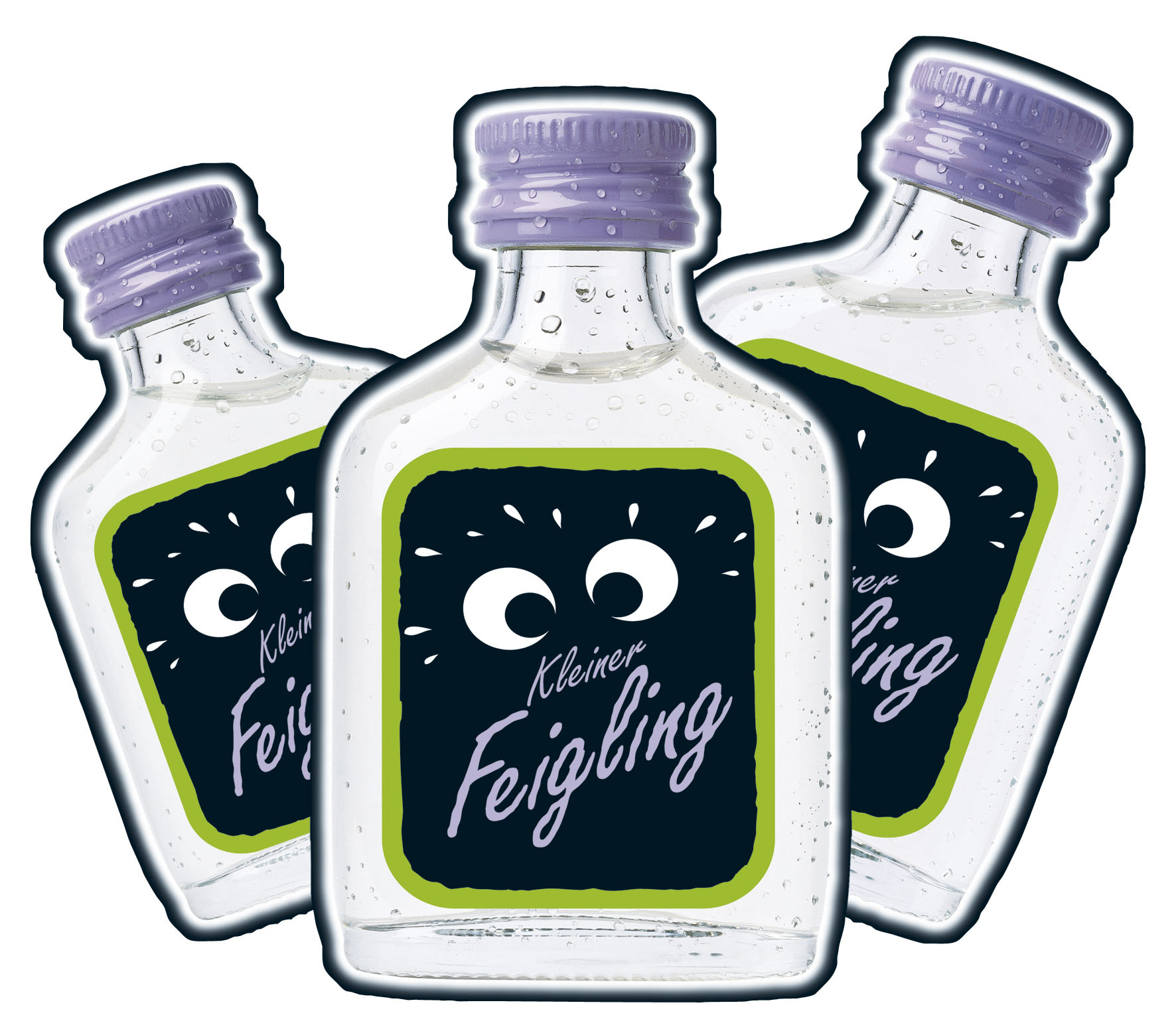
Kleiner Feigling

Kleiner Feigling is a brand of naturally-flavoured fig liquor, made by BEHN in Eckernförde, Germany. The production of Kleiner Feigling started in 1992 and since then has reached annual worldwide sales of 1,000,000+ cases. The name translates literally to Little Coward and is a pun on the words feige (cowardly) and Feige (fig), which are homophones in German.

In Germany, the drink is often purchased in 20 milliliter shooter-sized bottles. Custom dictates that the drinker tap the cap of the upside down bottle on the table, making bubbles in the liquid just before it is consumed.
