= Waldemar Behn =

Alcoholic beverage family company based in Eckernförde, Germany

Waldemar Behn, or simply BEHN, is a family-owned alcoholic beverage company (Gesellschaft mit beschränkter Haftung) based in Eckernförde, Germany. It was established in 1892 and is now run by the fourth generation. It's also a local wholesaler ("BEHN-Getränke") and a producer of convenience food through its Austrian affiliate "Nannerl".

BEHN established its first liqueur brands in the 1950s, but had to wait until 1992 to create a nationally recognized brand with the party drink Kleiner Feigling. In 2013, they bought Danish vodka brand Danzka from the French Marie Brizard Wine & Spirits/Belvedere corporation. Danzka boasts the fourth-largest vodka sales in duty-free shops worldwide, it is the first major foray abroad. Before the acquisition, BEHN had a turnover of €43 million and 300 employees, and grew with it by more than 50%. The company refrains from publishing updated numbers.

== Brands ==
- Andalö
- Dooley's, established in 2000
- Küstennebel, established in 1985
- De Geele Köm
- Kleiner Feigling established in 1992
- Danzka
