= Kiel-Hasee–Osterrönfeld railway =

Railway line in Germany

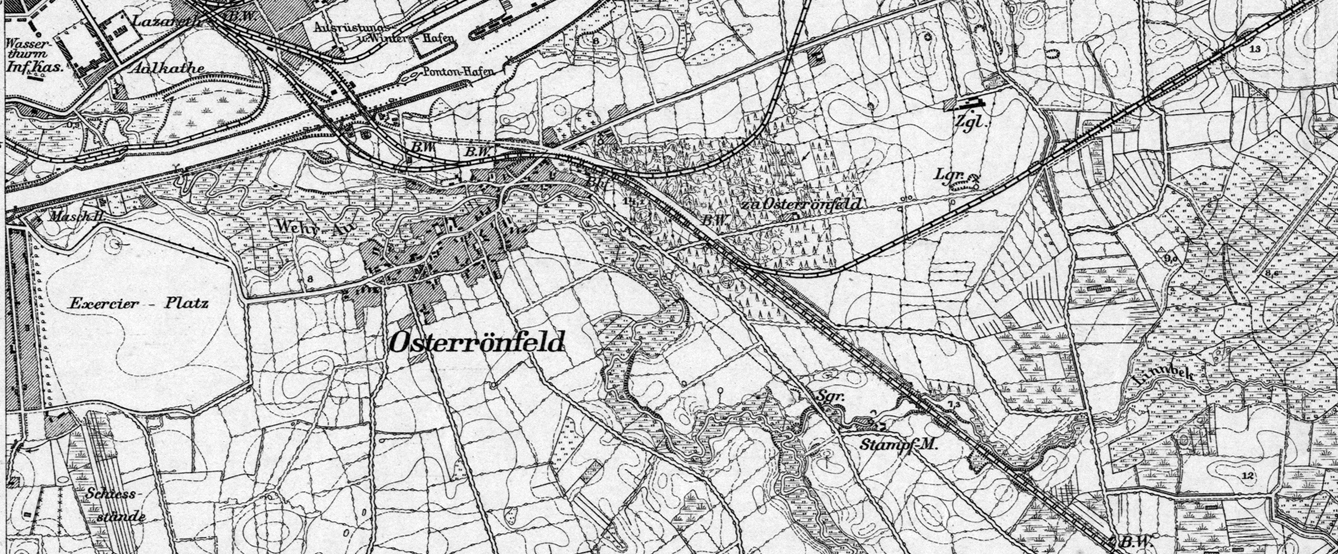
- Route near Osterrönfeld before construction of the Rendsburg High Bridge

Overview
- Line number: 1022

Service
- Route number: 134

Technical
- Line length: 30.9 km (19.2 mi)
- Signalling: PZB

The Kiel-Hasee–Osterrönfeld railway is a single-track, non-electrified main line in the German state of Schleswig-Holstein. It connects Kiel-Hassee CITTI-PARK station and Osterrönfeld south of Rendsburg.

== Route ==
The line branches off from the Kiel–Flensburg railway at Kiel-Hassee CITTI-PARK station, about 2 km (1.2 mi) west of Kiel Hauptbahnhof. From there, the line runs west, partly parallel to the A 210 autobahn. Near Felde, the line crosses the Eider River. Originally, the line terminated at the first Osterrönfeld station. However, for the construction of the Rendsburg High Bridge, the Neumünster–Flensburg railway had to be rerouted on an embankment through the town, and a new station was built south of the town. To connect the line from Kiel to the new station, it was diverted south between Schülldorf and Osterrönfeld.

== History ==
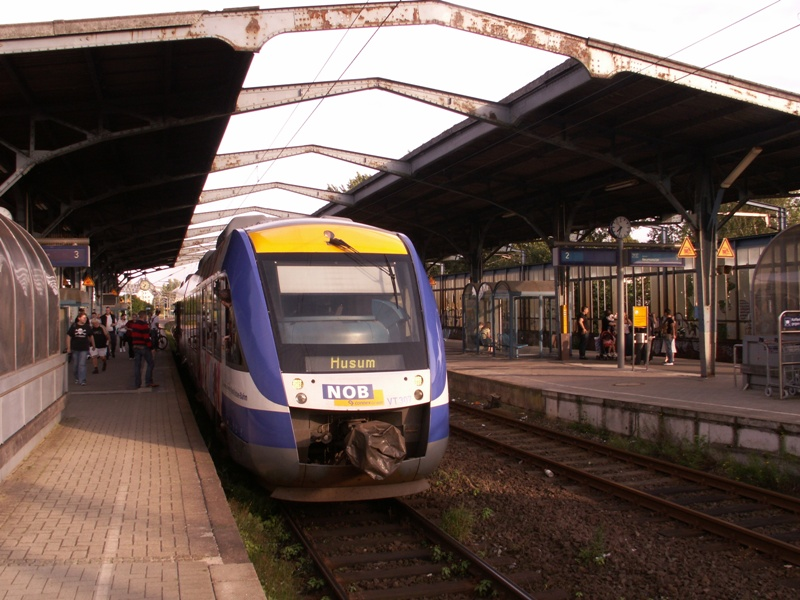
Rendsburg station

The line was opened on 15 October 1904 by the Prussian State Railways. Passenger services were mostly provided by local trains. Already in the late 1920s, some through trains ran to Husum, some of which made a few stops only. Later, three to four pairs of fast trains regularly ran on the route, including a pair of Husum–Lübeck trains. After the closure of the Niebüll-Flensburg line in 1980, a pair of trains run seasonally as the Sylter Welle from Kiel (sometimes also from Lübeck) to Westerland) via Jübek instead of Flensburg. This train ran in 2005 for the last time and was the last locomotive-hauled passenger train on the line.

The newest station was opened between Rendsburg and Kiel at Mettenhof in the early 1970s to serve a satellite settlement of Kiel. In 1984 all stops between Rendsburg and Kiel were closed. Regional fast trains (Regionalschnellbahnen) were introduced on the line in 1987.

Felde station (formerly Brandsbek) was re-opened for the start of the Nord-Ostsee-Bahn (NOB) service (now operated by Veolia Verkehr) on 5 November 2000.

Since December 2011, the line has been operated by DB Regio. On 4 January 2015, the stations of Kiel-Russee, Melsdorf, Achterwehr, and Schülldorf were reactivated, and the new Bredenbek stations was opened. These stations have since been served hourly by the additional RB75 Kiel–Rendsburg regionalbahn service. The line also serves Kiel-Hassee Cittipark station. The Felde was reclassified from a Haltepunkt (roughly "halt") to a station with the installation of the previously dismantled passing loop. Since then, trains on the RE74 and RB75 lines have crossed there. Some regional train services run to Schleswig or Husum during off-peak hours and on certain days. From December 2023, Nordbahn Eisenbahngesellschaft (NBE) took over operation of the northern part of the Schleswig-Holstein battery network, including this line.

== Current operations ==
The RE 74 and RB 75 lines each run hourly. The RE74 Kiel–Rendsburg–Husum line only stops in Felde between Kiel and Rendsburg.
