= Eckernförde station =

Station in Eckernförde, Schleswig-Holstein, Germany

Eckernförde
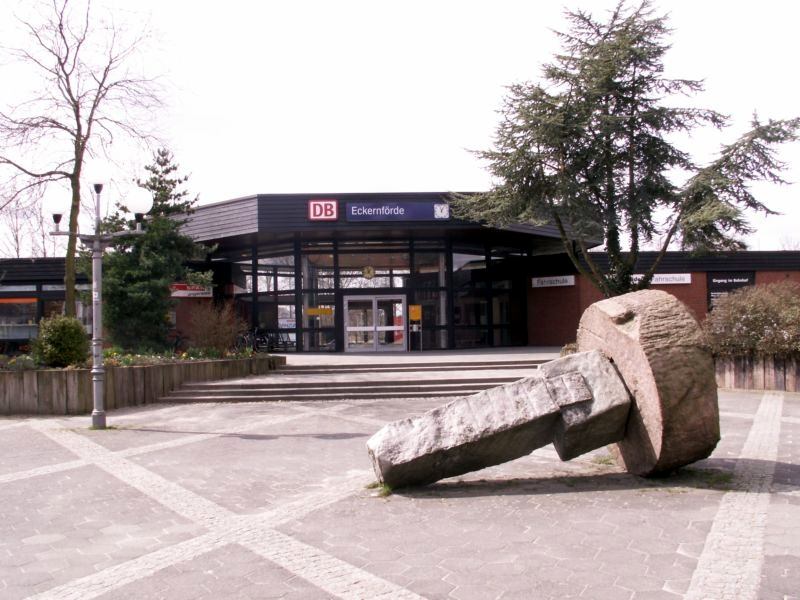
- Station building and forecourt

General information
- Location: Reeperbahn 54-58, Eckernförde, Schleswig-Holstein; Germany
- Coordinates: 54°28′04″N 9°50′07″E
- Lines: Kiel–Flensburg (KBS 146); Eckernförde–Kappeln (dismantled); Eckernförde–Owschlag (dismantled); Eckernförde Port Railway (dismantled)
- Platforms: 3

Construction
- Accessible: Yes

Other information
- Station code: 1457
- DS100 code: AEC
- IBNR: 8001654
- Category: 5
- Website: www.bahnhof.de

History
- Opened: 1 July 1881

Services
Preceding station		Following station
Terminus	RE 72	Gettorf towards Kiel Hbf
Rieseby towards Rieseby Schleibrücke Süd	RB 73	Gettorf towards Kiel Hbf
Location

Eckernförde station is the station of the town of Eckernförde in the German state of Schleswig-Holstein. It is a through station and the most important en-route station on the Kiel–Flensburg railway. It is classified by Deutsche Bahn as a category 5 station. To the north of the entrance building there was also a terminal station of the Eckernförde District Railway (German: Eckernförder Kreisbahnen) until 1958.

== Rail services ==
Eckernförde station has three platform tracks and other tracks that do not have platforms. Currently, tracks 1 and 2 are used for passenger services–until 2007 these were tracks 1 and 3:

- track 1 is used by through trains running between Kiel and Flensburg and between Flensburg and Kiel, in the off-peak it sometimes used by trains running between Kiel and Eckernförde and return;
- track 2 is mainly reserved for trains between Kiel and Eckernförde and return and it is also partly used in peak hours by long-distance trains.

The length of the platforms is (in rounded figures) 225 metres for track 1, 370 m for track 2 and 426 m for track 3. The latter has since been downgraded to a railway siding.

Line	Route	Timetable route
RE 72	Kiel – Gettorf – Eckernförde	146
RB 73	Kiel – Gettorf – Eckernförde – Rieseby Schleibrücke Süd	146

Since 2009, a regional electronic interlocking in Eckernförde station has controlled the electronic signals on the entire section between Eckernförde and Flensburg and the Lindaunis Bridge, a bascule bridge across the Schlei in Lindaunis.

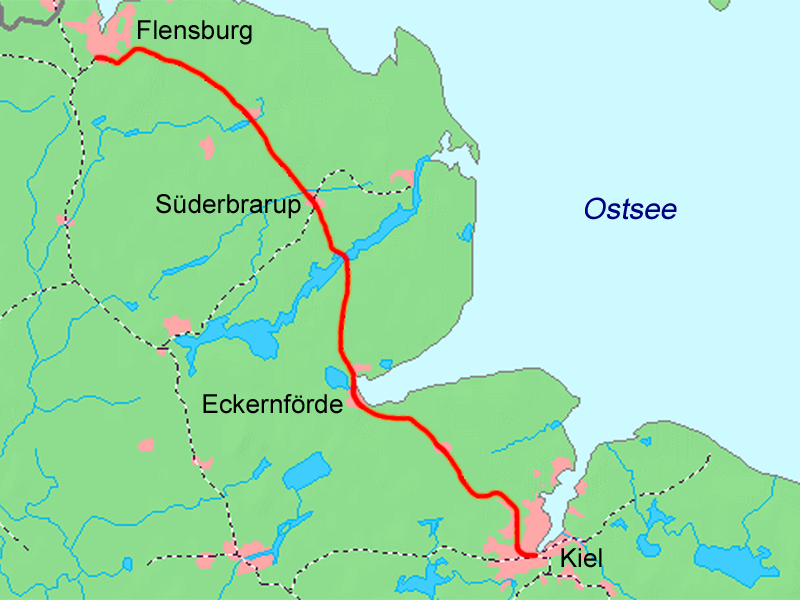
Kiel–Flensburg railway

== History ==
The Kiel-Flensburg-Eckernförde Railway Company (Kiel-Eckernförde-Flensburger Eisenbahn-Gesellschaft, KEFE)) opened the Kiel–Eckernförde section of the Kiel–Flensburg line on 1 July 1881 and the Eckernförde–Flensburg section on 21 December 1881. Traffic was satisfactory and it was taken over by the Prussian state railways on 1 July 1903. It became part of Deutsche Reichsbahn on 1 April 1920. The Eckernförde–Kappeln Narrow Gauge Railway Company (Eckernförde-Kappelner Schmalspurbahn-Gesellschaft) opened a railway to Kappeln with its own terminus at the northern end of Eckernförde station on 26 January 1889, which was closed in 1958. On 1 April 1903, the Eckernförde district assumed this line and opened a second line to Owschlag on 30 October 1904, which operated until 1954. To distinguish it from the Eckernförde District Railway station (Kreisbahnhof Eckernförde) and two other stations in the Eckernförde urban area of the Eckernförde District Railway (Carlshöhe, Schnaap—which was part of Borby until Borby's incorporation in Eckernförde in 1934—and, from 1947, Hasenheide), the station was initially designated as the Eckernförde Staatsbahnhof (Eckernförde state station), but it was also, at times, called Reichsbahnhof Eckernförde (Eckernförde Reichsbahn station) and after the Second World War, for a time it was called Eckernförde Hauptbahnhof (Eckernförde main station).

Because after the Second World War, the British military governors of Schleswig-Holstein ("Regional Commissioners", originally Hugh Champion de Crespigny) lived in the Altenhof manor house, but had their seat at “Somerset House” in Kiel, the line was repaired relatively quickly after the war and services resumed between Kiel and Eckernförde with a morning and an evening services and a single stop at Altenhof station. The trains had a single passenger car for the local population and a lounge car for the British military governor. Eckernförde station was also the destination of trains carrying refugees after the war.

Locomotives were stationed in Eckernförde from the 1960s to the early 1990s, but only a single diesel locomotive still operated to service the port railway. The former engine shed was replaced by for a parking lot after the closure of the port railway. There were around 50 staff at the station at one time.

From 1972 to 1999, Eckernförde station was serviced by individual Durchgangszug (a type of express) and Intercity (IC) trains on the weekends. The IC trains operated, inter alia, on the Eckernförde–Koblenz (initially from Flensburg), Cologne–Eckernförde and Düsseldorf–Hanover–Eckernförde routes. These mainly carried German soldiers. In the first years after the opening of the resort of Damp 2000 in 1972, special IC trains ran from Cologne to Eckernförde and back for weekend getaways.

In the early 1980s, there were plans to close the Kiel–Flensburg line north of Eckernförde.

The original entrance building of Eckernförder station—built in 1880/81 and expanded several times since to about three times its original size—was demolished in 1973 after, a few months earlier, serving as a film set for part of the television adaptation of Hans Fallada's novel, Bauern, Bonzen und Bomben (published in English as A Small Circus). Only the signalling infrastructure remained until the completion of the new station building in 1974. Shortly before, the freight yard had been moved to the south of the entrance building; this area is now used by the bus station. The ground plan of the current station building consists of four hexagons and an extension to the north consisting of two sections at an angle.

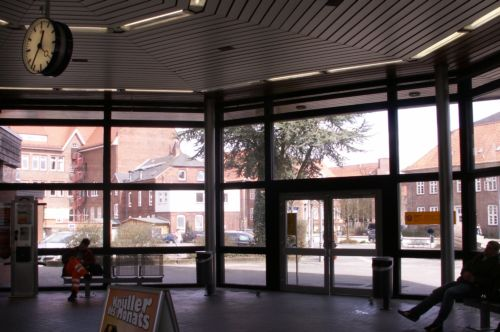
Entrance hall

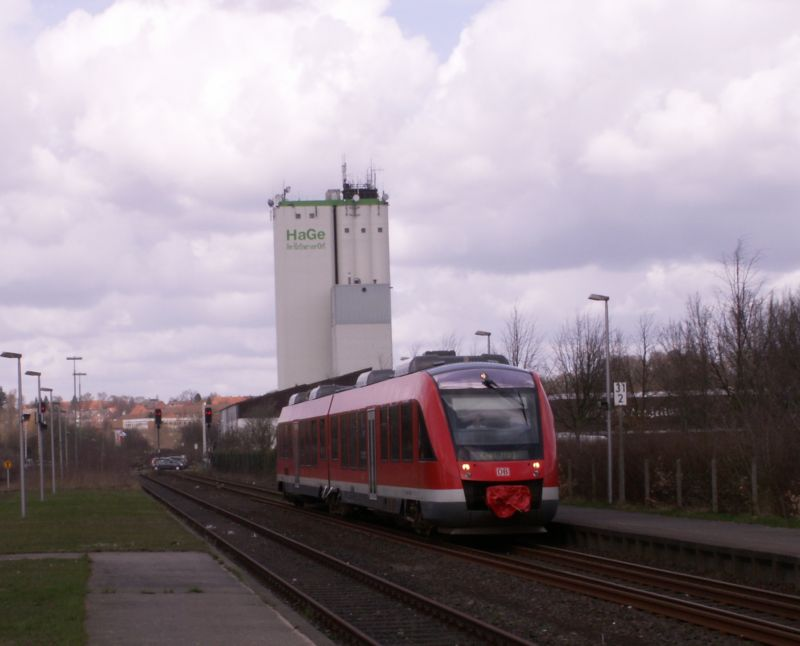
Alstrom Coradia LINT entering station

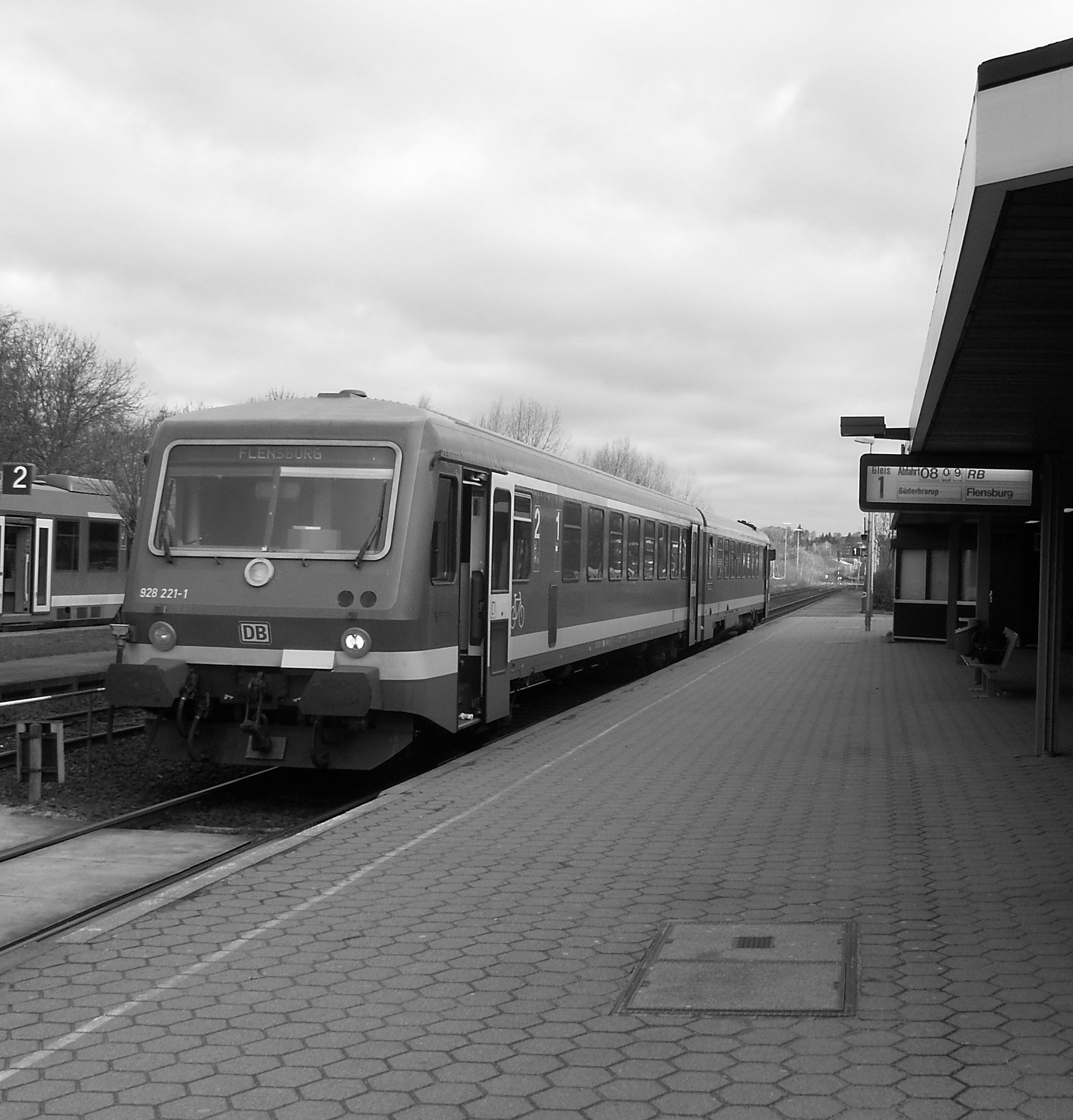
VT628 on platform 1

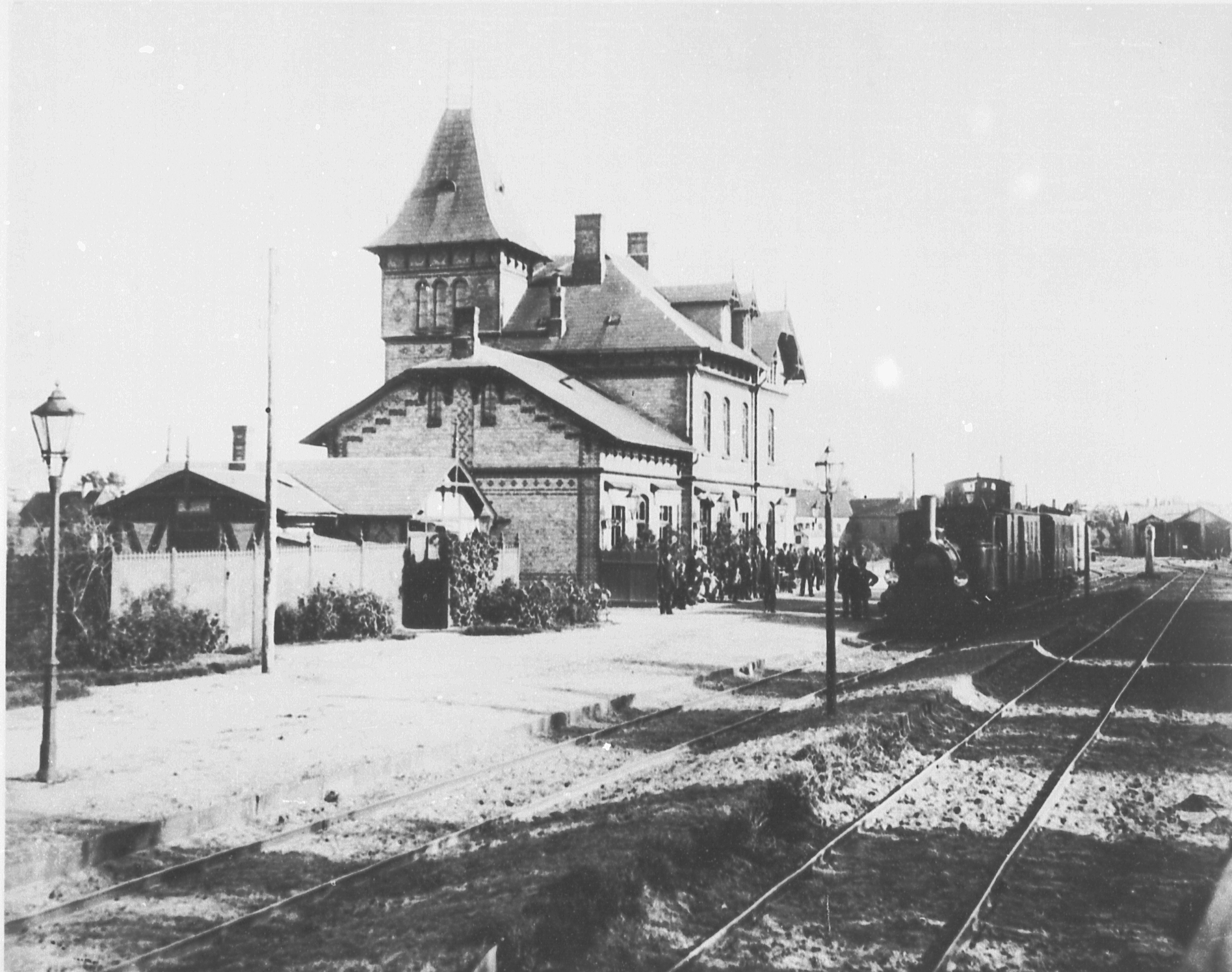
The old station building in 1887

== Outlook ==
It is planned to replace the entrance building built in 1973/74 by a new building. This would also provide space for a cinema and retail shops alongside the railway service areas and the office of the Bahnhofsmission (a charity helping travellers and the needy at stations). These plans are uncertain.

In the proposed StadtRegionalBahn Kiel (Kiel regional Stadtbahn), one of the lines runs to Eckernförde and would be served twice an hour. The planned services would run in Kiel on a route between Kiel-Suchsdorf and Kiel Hauptbahnhof and also on another route through the University. According to these plans, the route would be electrified and a second station would be built in the south of Eckernförde. Eckernförde station would be renamed Eckernförde Hauptbahnhof. After a decision of the district council of Rendsburg-Eckernförde in December 2014 to reject these plans, these plans are not being pursued any further.

Line	Planned route
S 5	Eckernförde Hbf. – Eckernförde Süd – Gettorf Hbf. – Gettorf Süd – Neuwittenbek – Kiel-Klausbrooker Weg – Christian-Albrechts-Universität – Waitzstraße – Holstenplatz – Kiel Hauptbahnhof – Gablenzstraße – Seefischmarkt – Neumühlen
