= Andalö =

German liqueur brand

Andalö is a brand of liqueur, made by BEHN in Eckernförde, Germany. The brand was established in 2010. Andalö is made on the basis of common sea-buckthorn and has an alcohol content of 15% ABV.

== Awards ==
The liqueur won the silver medal of the International Review of Spirits Award from the Beverage Testing Institute. It also gained a recognition as Best Buy. Andalö reached 89 from 100 points and is called Highly Recommended.
