= Levensau High Bridge =

Levensau High Bridge Levensauer Hochbrücke
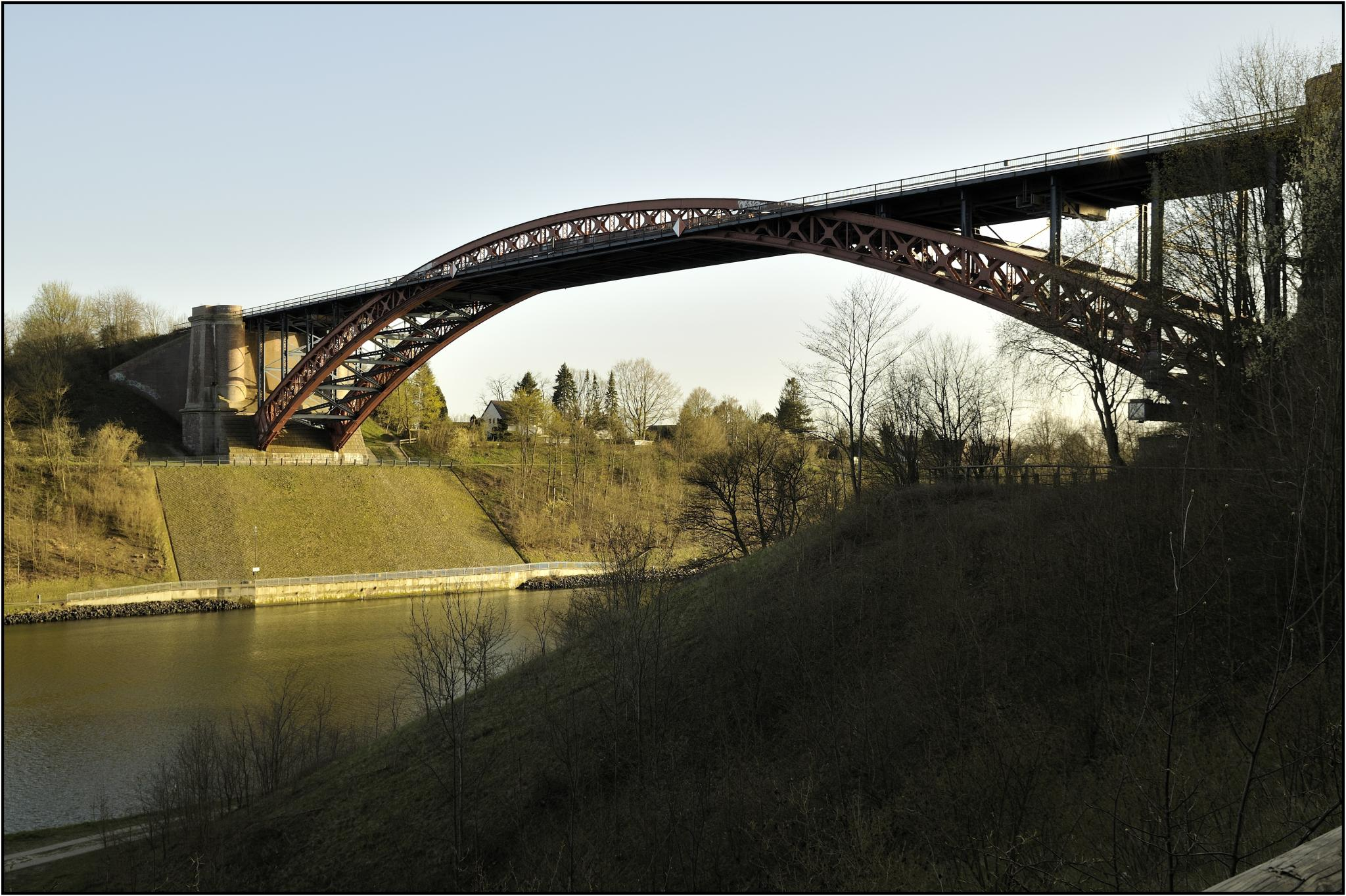
- Coordinates: 54°22′4″N 10°4′33″E
- Carries: Kiel-Flensburg Railway, local road
- Crosses: Kiel Canal

Characteristics
- Design: Arch bridge
- Material: Steel
- Total length: 180 metres (590 ft)
- Longest span: 163 metres (535 ft)
- Piers in water: None
- Clearance above: 42 metres (138 ft)

History
- Construction start: 1893
- Construction end: 1894

Location
- Interactive map of Levensau High Bridge

Levensau Motorway Bridge Levensauer Schnellstraßenbrücke
- Coordinates: 54°22′6″N 10°4′38″E
- Carries: Bundesstraße 76
- Crosses: Kiel Canal

History
- Construction end: 1984

Location
- Interactive map of Levensau Motorway Bridge

The Levensau High Bridge (German: Levensauer Straßen- und Eisenbahnhochbrücke; short: Levensauer Hochbrücke) is a high level arch bridge that spans the Kiel Canal in the German state of Schleswig-Holstein. Built in 1894 it is the oldest bridge crossing the Kiel Canal. A second bridge nearby, opened 1984, is referred to as Levensau Motorway Bridge (German: Levensauer Schnellstraßenbrücke).

== Previous history ==
The lower section of the small river Levensau was extended between 1777 and 1784 to become part of the Eider Canal. Between 1887 and 1895 the Eider Canal was further extended and straightened to become part of the Kiel Canal (then Kaiser-Wilhelm-Kanal). The extended canal necessitated a fixed link for the Kiel–Flensburg railway as well as the principal road from Kiel to Eckernförde.

Historic pictures
Being a landmark on the Kiel canal, the bridge was depicted on postcards and also used as a popular background for pictures of ships transiting the canal.

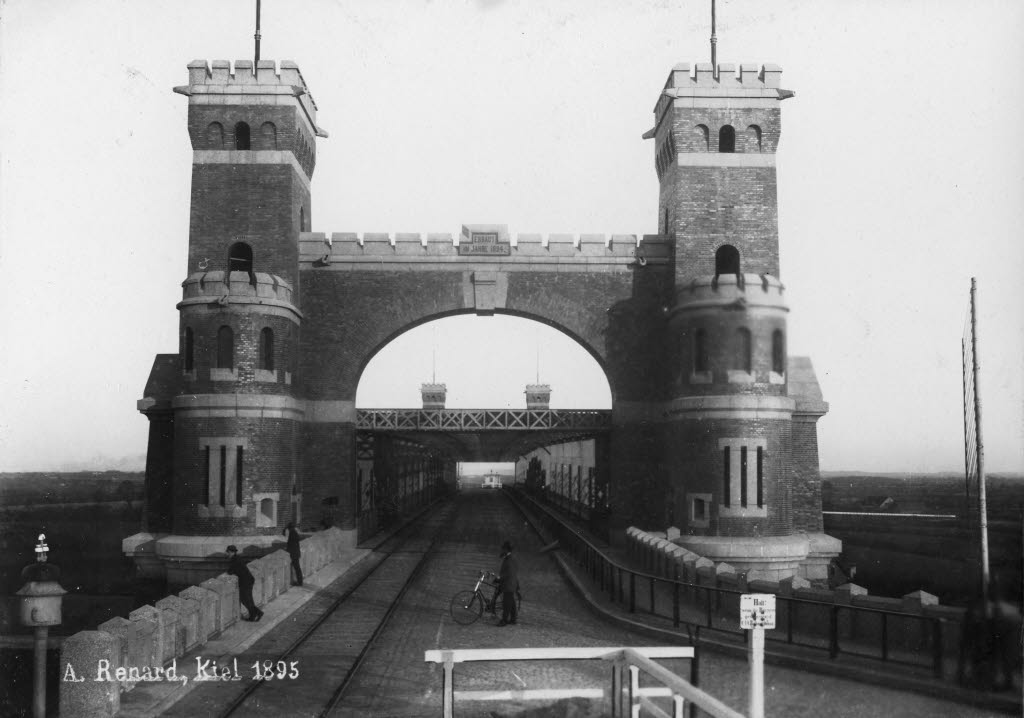
The towers of the bridge, postcard from 1895

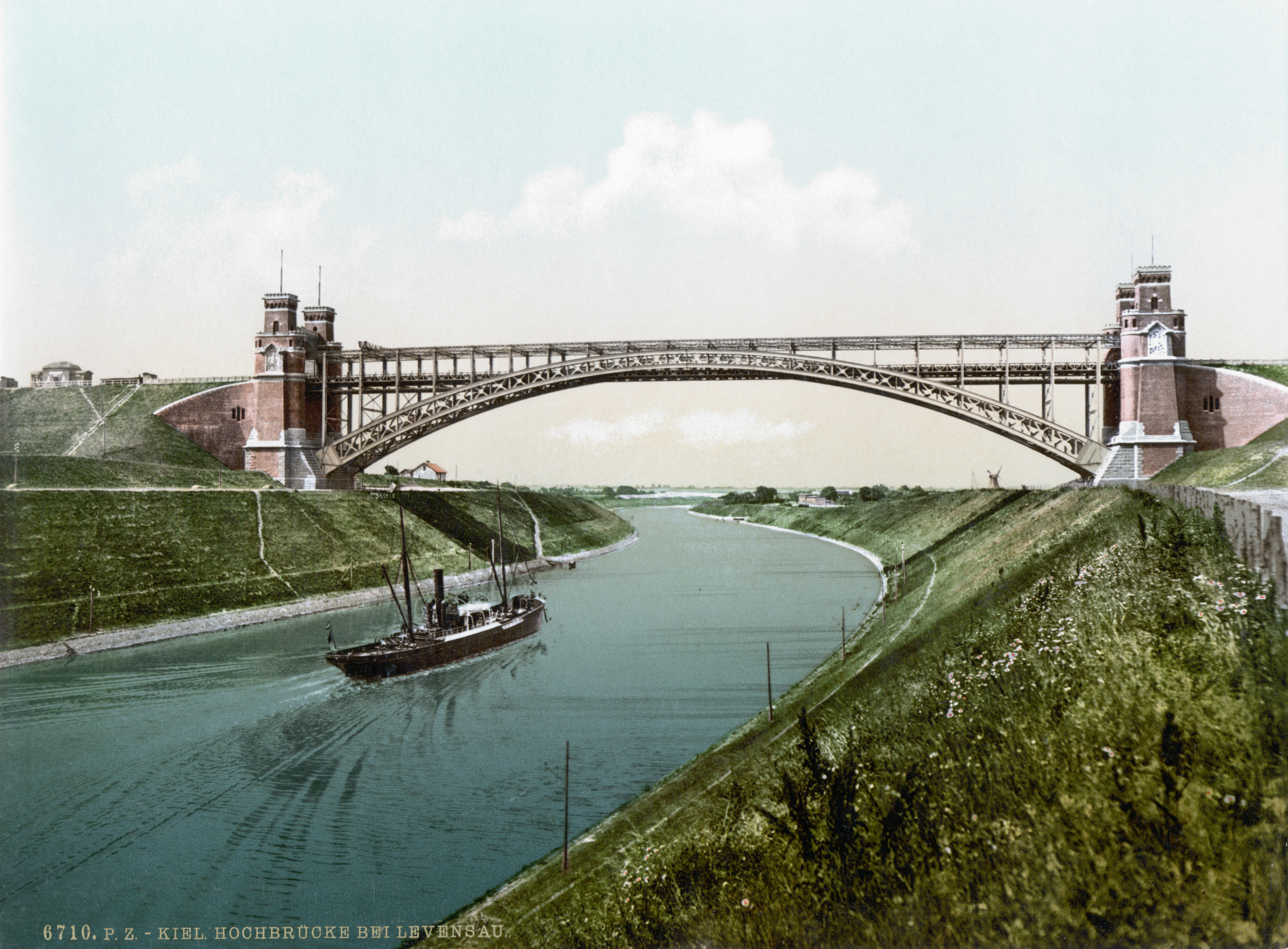
The bridge ca. 1900

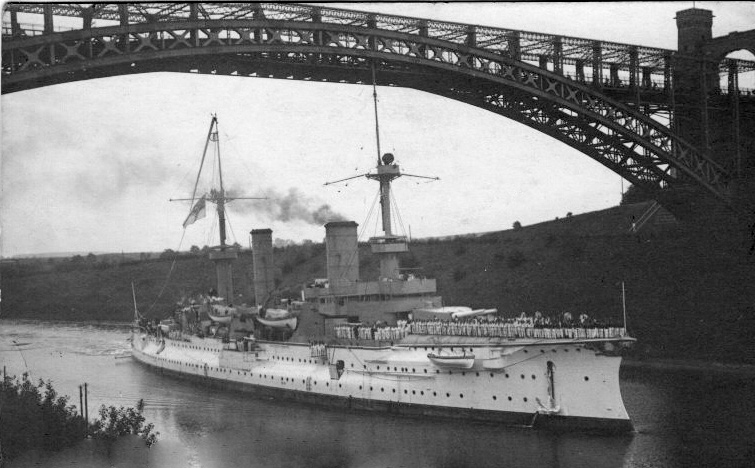
Armoured cruiser
SMS Fürst Bismarck, 1909

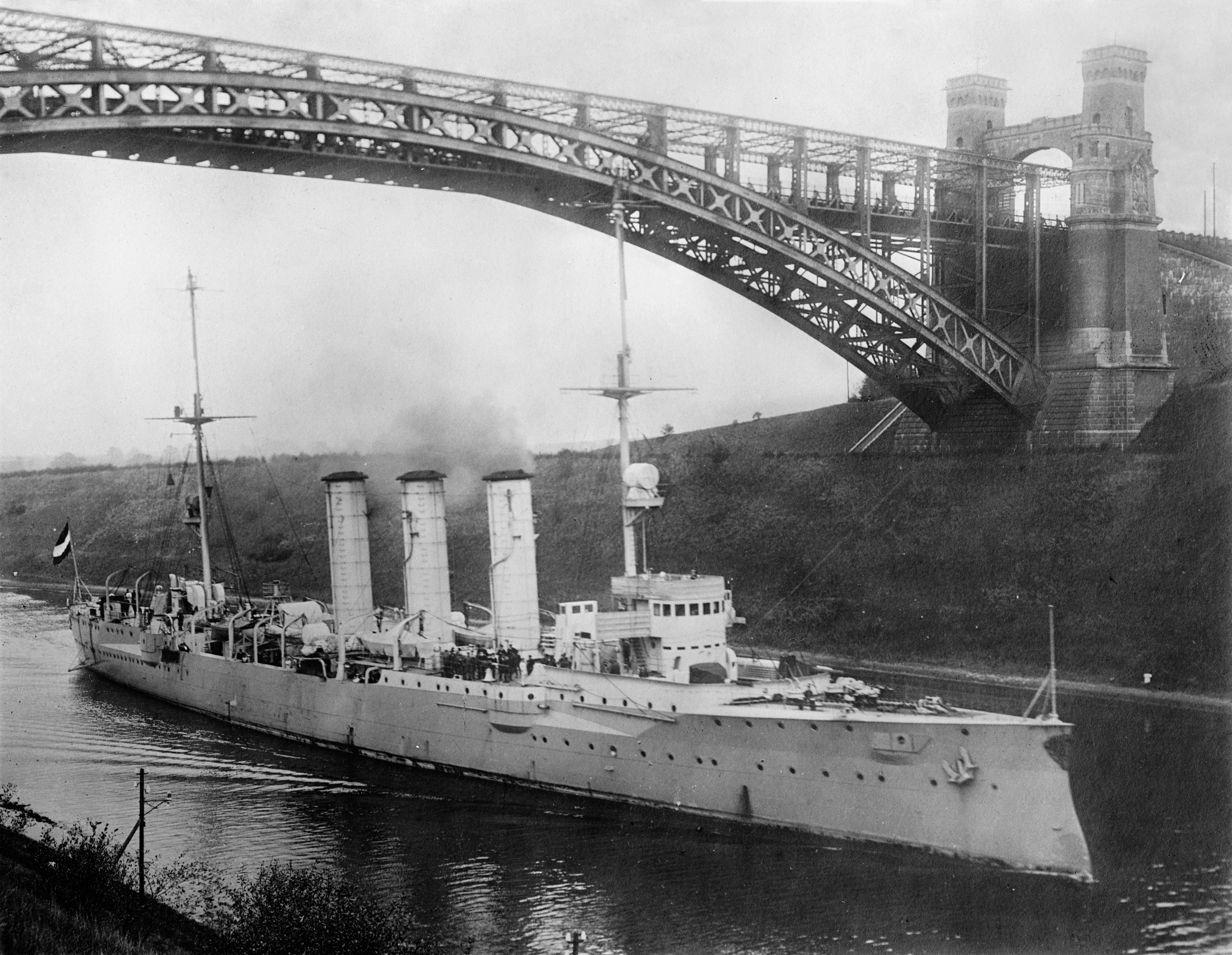
Light cruiser
SMS Dresden, ca. 1912

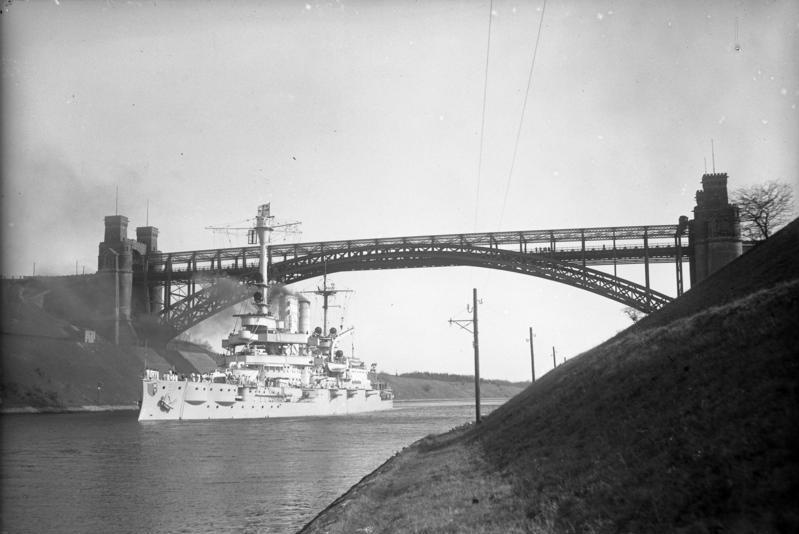
Battleship
SMS Schleswig-Holstein, 1932

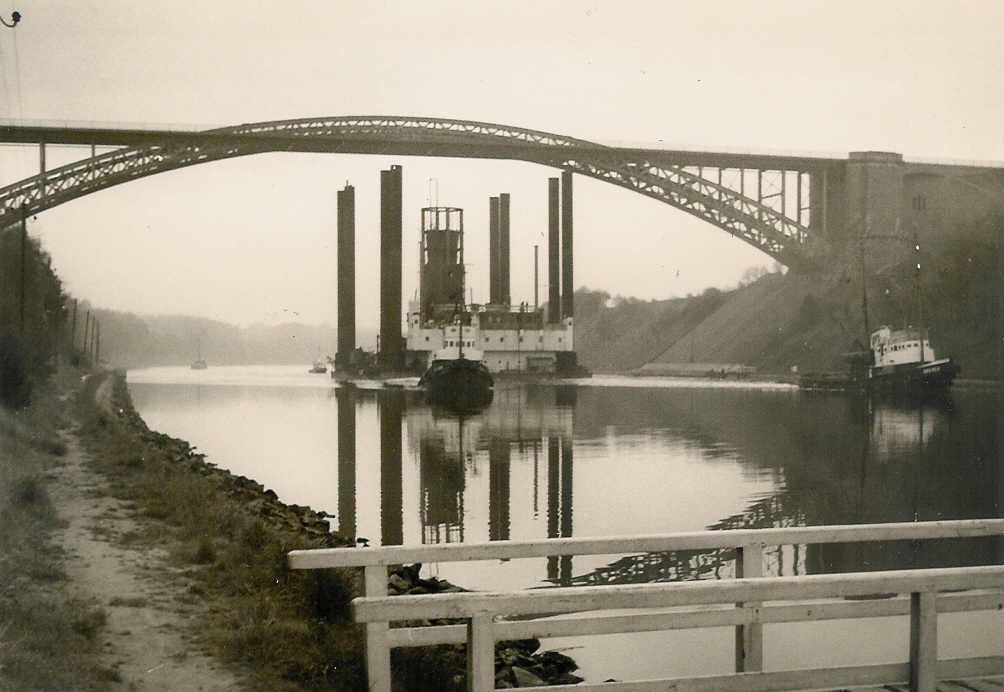
Components of the
″Alte Weser″ lighthouse,
ca. 1961

== Design and construction ==
Construction of the bridge took 1 1/2 years. Work on the abutments was started in June 1893 and bricklaying lasted until end of that year. On top of the abutments the bridge featured four towers by architect Hermann Muthesius. The scaffolding that supported the steel elements during construction was erected from November 1893 and assembly of the steel construction started in May 1894. The bridge was inaugurated by Emperor Wilhelm II in December 1894. Originally the carriageway was designed in such a way that it could not be used by road and rail traffic simultaneously – if a train approached, the bridge was closed for cars and lorries. In the course of a first modification a barrier between road and railway was installed, however this limited the width of the road to 4.5 metres (15 ft) so that lorries were unable to pass each other on the bridge. Furthermore, the pedestrian way was only 90 centimetres (35 in) wide. In 1954, the bridge was extensively reworked to allow for independent use by road, rail and pedestrians. The towers were torn down and the carriageway was enlarged.

== Replacement ==
In 1984 a four-lane road bridge was opened for road traffic, taking over the role as main canal crossing for the Kiel–Schleswig road (route 76).

The current bridge is still used for the railway and local road traffic, including bicycles. Its span is too short for the canal expansion to a width of 162 metres (531 ft). In 2009 the cost estimate for the replacement stood at 42 million euros. The replacement of the old bridge with a substitute was decided in 2018. The replacement was also deemed necessary due to technical reasons. However, in addition to taking the geological condition of the subsoil into consideration the project also has to respect environmental aspects (for instance the presence of bats). The project itself with a number of illustrations and some information in English is presented by its engineers. There is also a direct webcam displaying the bridge and the current construction zone.

== Bat habitat ==
A colony of about 5,000 bats of several species hibernate inside the old brick abutments. The colony is protected under the Convention on International Trade in Endangered Species of Wild Fauna and Flora, CITES, and includes microbats, common noctules, Daubenton's bats and Natterer's bats. The population was examined by scientists of the Kiel University and is considered the largest in Northern Europe.

== Gallery ==
Contemporary pictures
The Levensau Motorway Bridge, built in 1984, can be seen on some of the newer pictures.

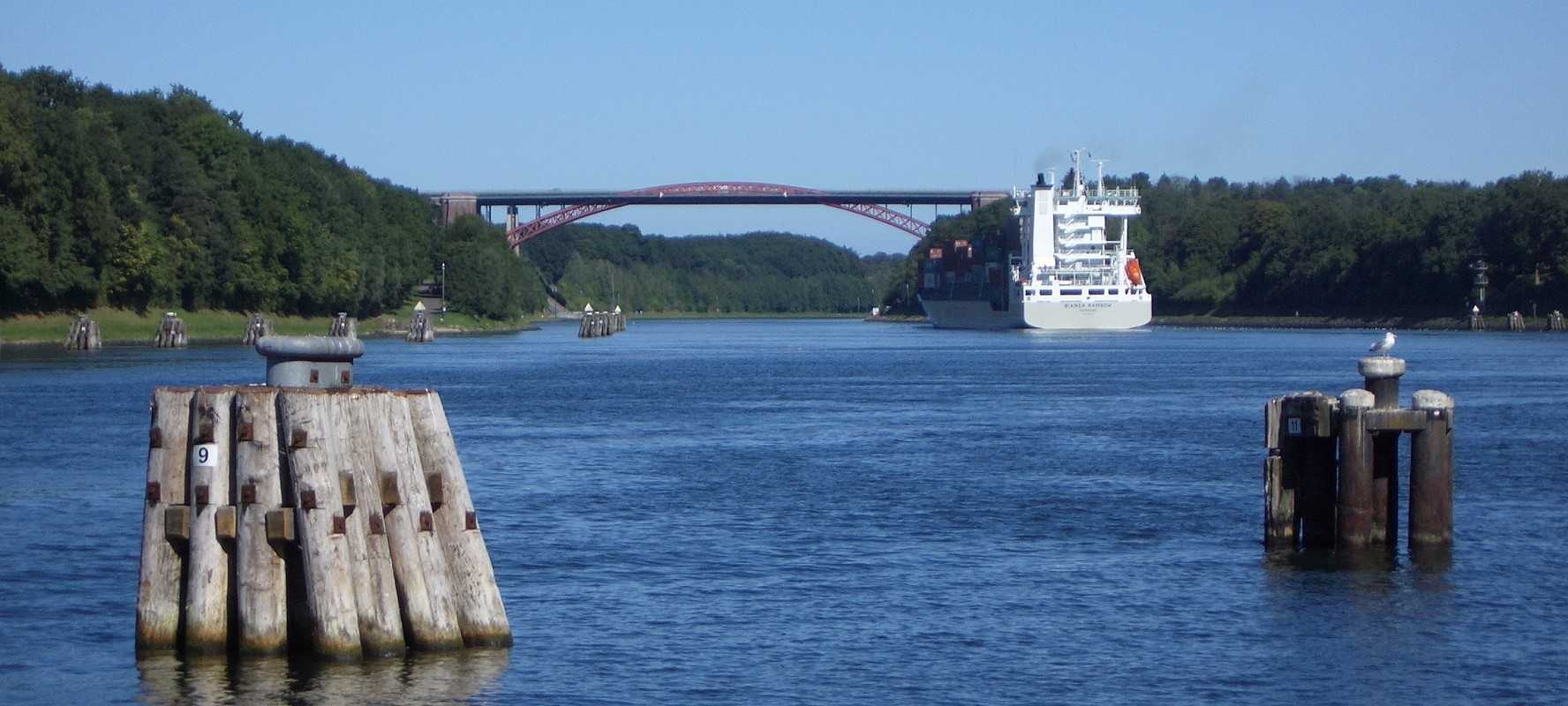
The bridge from the west, 2005

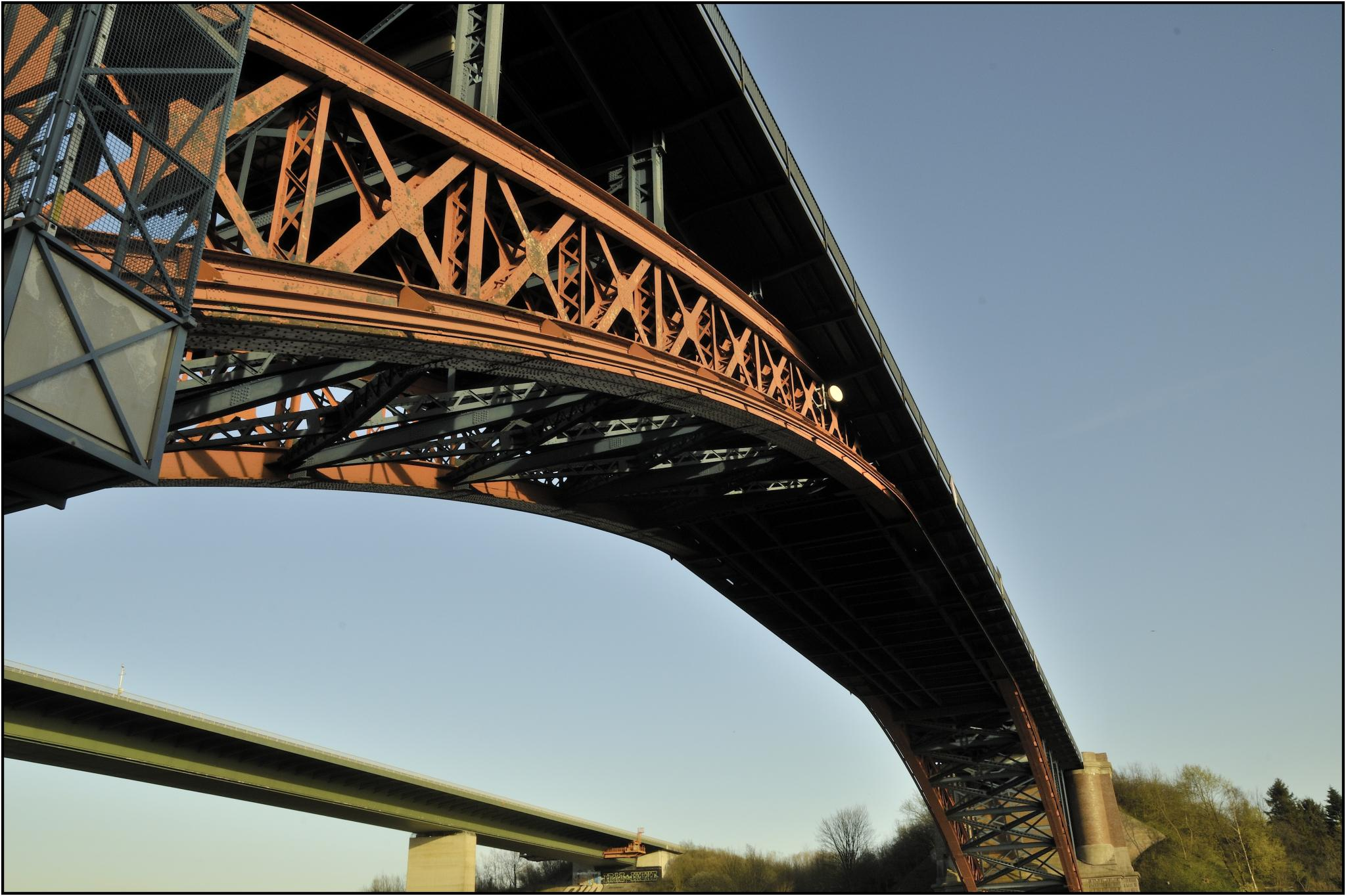
Detail of the bridge, 2011

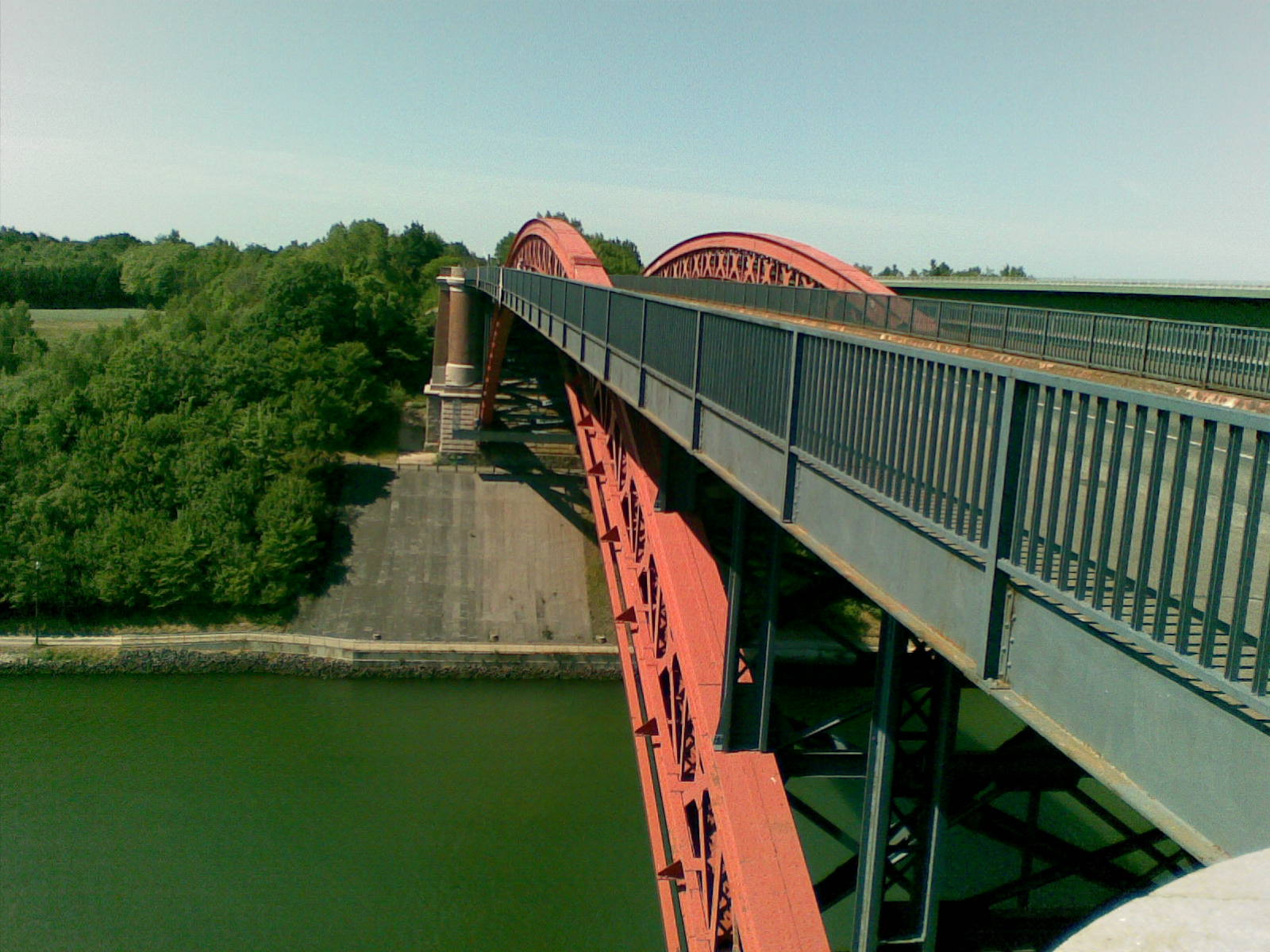
View across the bridge from the southern side

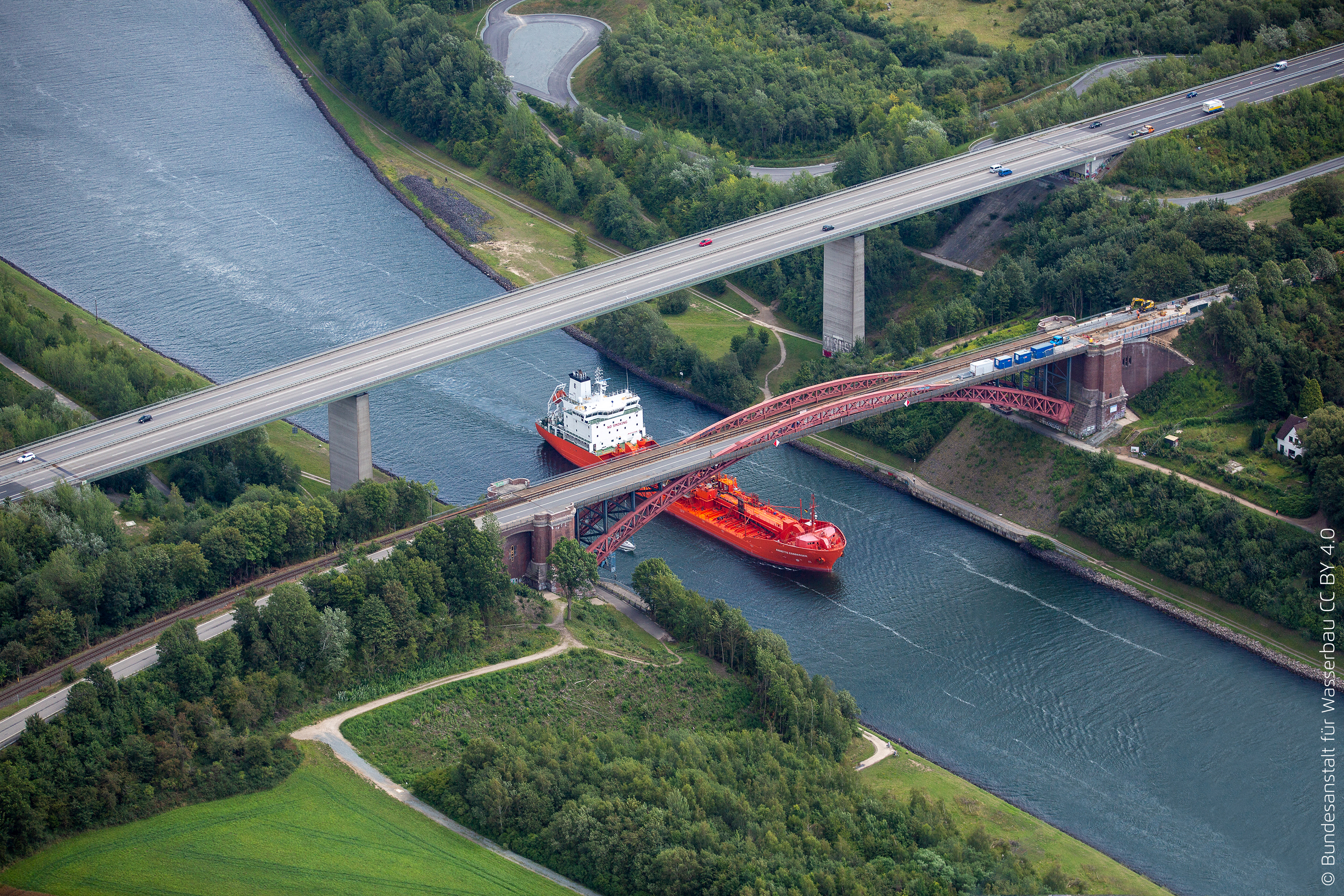
Old and new bridge in 2019

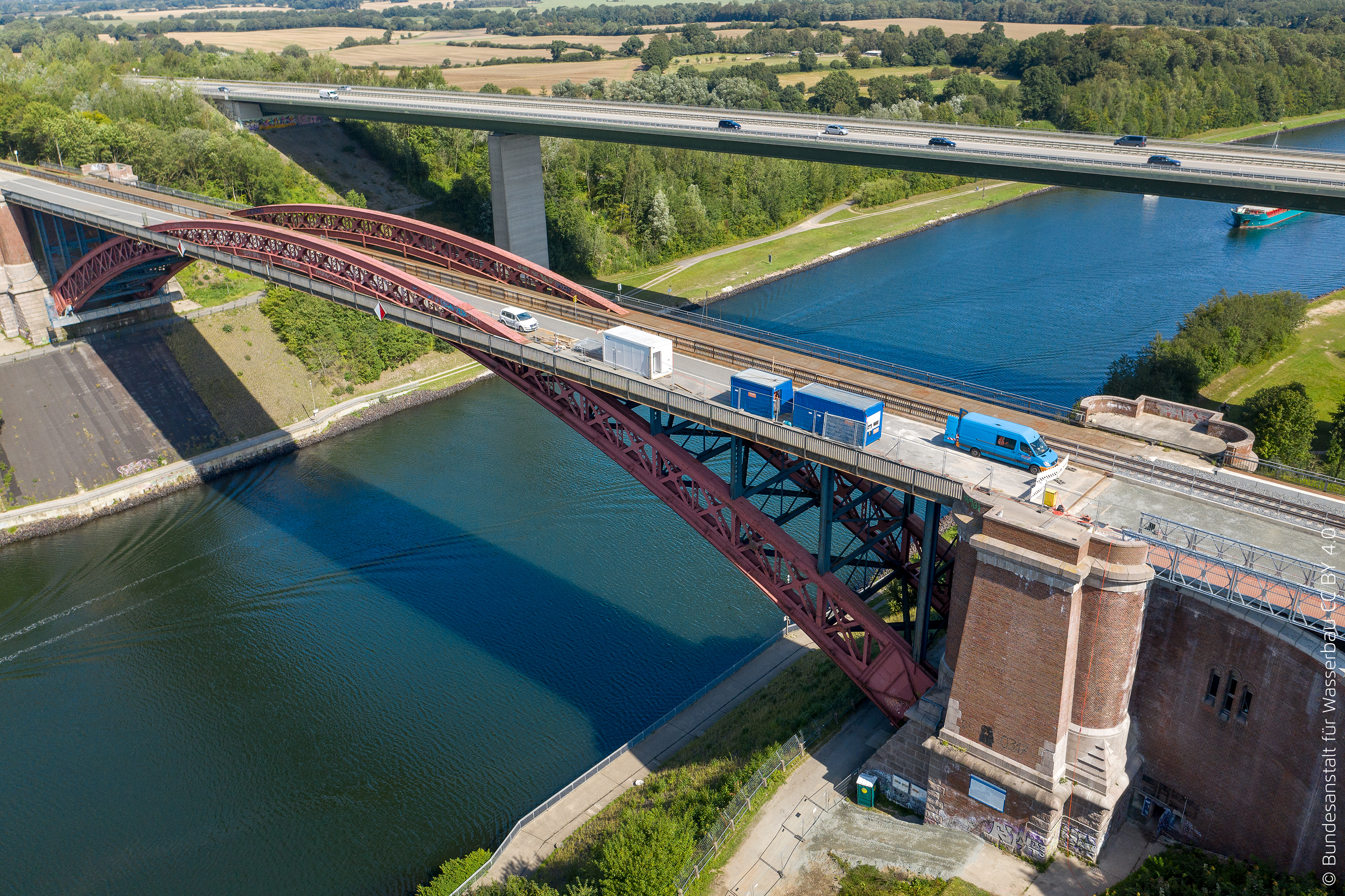
The old tower (southern side) will be maintained as a bat habitat, despite the reconstruction (2019).

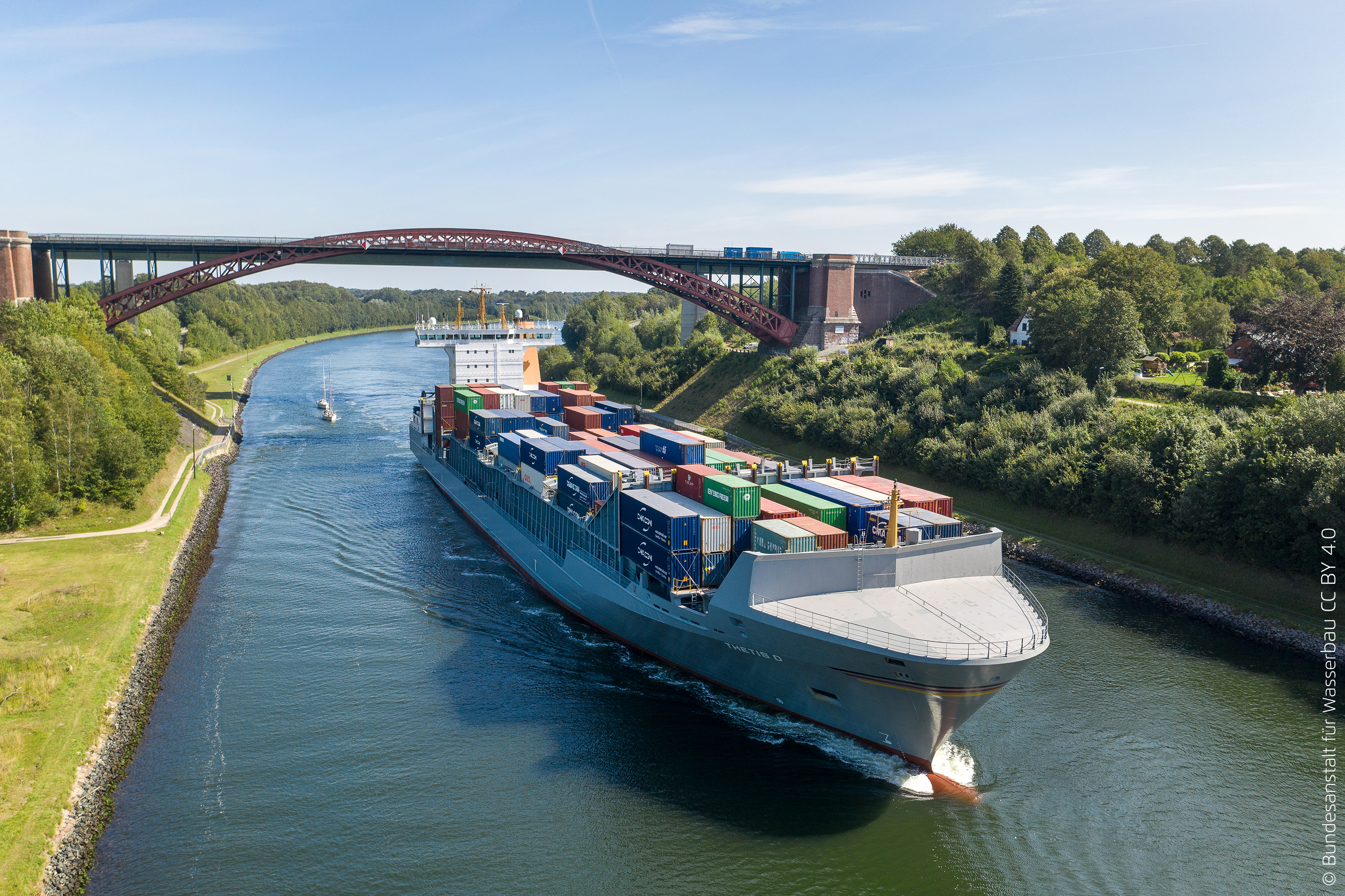
A container ship with both bridges

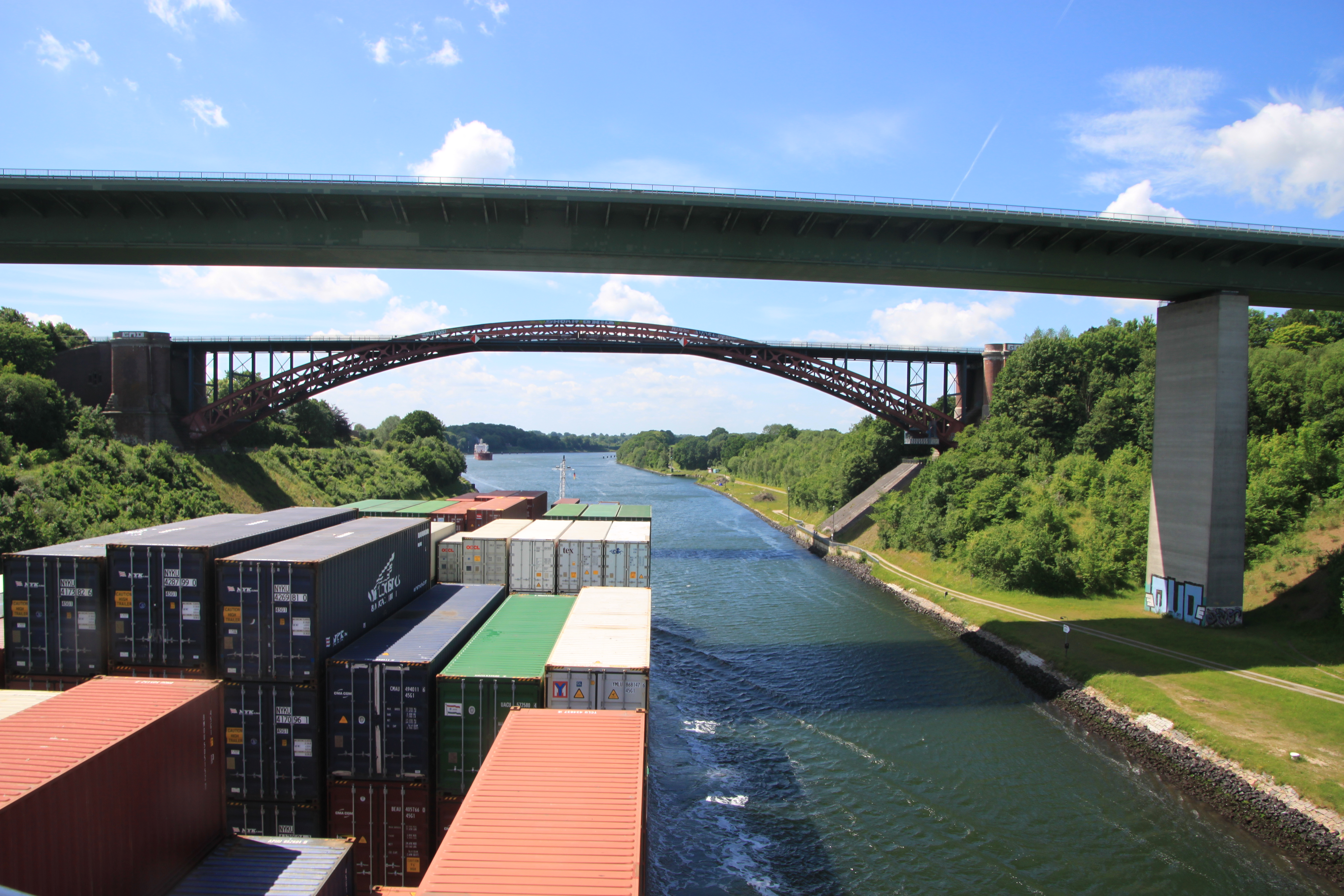
Levensau Motorway Bridge and Levensau High Bridge
