= Dooley's =

Dooley's is a German cream liqueur combining toffee and vodka, made by BEHN in Eckernförde. It is marketed in a red and blue opaque bottle. The liqueur itself is a creamy colour.

== Ingredients ==
- Vodka
- Sugar
- Flavoring

Alcohol content is 17 percent ABV.
