= Ingmar Zahorsky =

German photojournalist (born 1983)

Ingmar Zahorsky (born 17 February 1983 in Eckernförde, Schleswig-Holstein) is a photojournalist and award-winning media artist from Germany. He is the son of physicist Karl-Heinz Zahorsky who is the founder and president of LaserSoft Imaging AG. He is an honors graduate of The Art Institutes, San Francisco.

Zahorsky's commercial media work for clients such as Yahoo!, AMD and Cisco had a wide audience on television and the web. He worked as a videographer on the full dome planetarium show Maya Skies. The show had its world premiere at the Instituto Politécnico Nacional, Mexico City on 23 October 2009.

His journalism career started at Amateur Illustrator for which he interviewed artists such as Dana Lynne Anderson, Jacob Appelbaum and Ali Jamalzadeh. Recently he worked in Nepal, Kathmandu covering the Maoist uprising.

Zahorsky currently is the photo editor of CHINAsia Update, a diplomatic southeast Asian magazine.
