= Train meet =

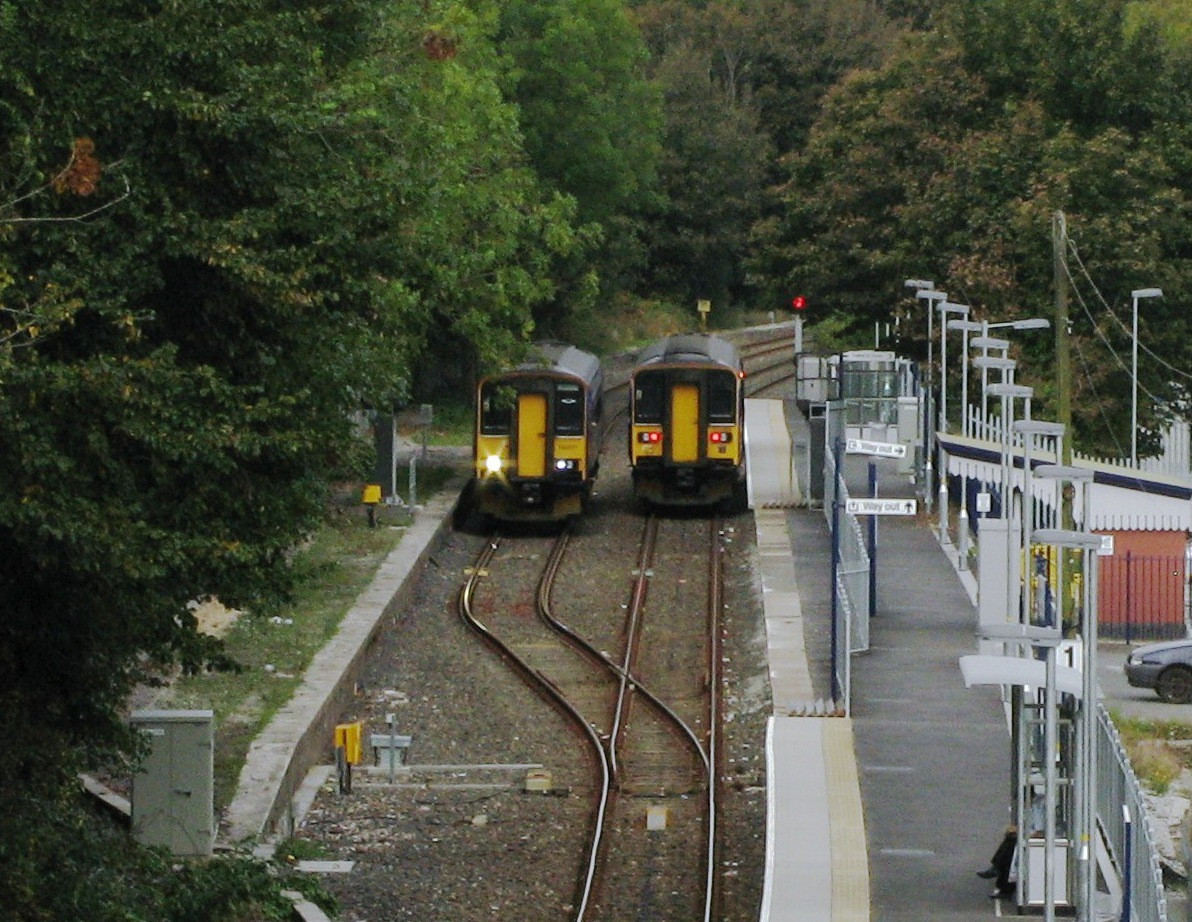
Train meet in Penryn, England

A train meet is the situation in railroading or rail transit operations in which a train traveling in one direction "meets" another traveling in the opposite direction, either while traveling on parallel double or multiple tracks, or while stopping and waiting on a railroad siding for the other train to pass on a single track mainline. Determining the time and location of where such trains meet is paramount in railroad engineering particularly in single track sections to avoid collisions or to allow faster trains to bypass slower service trains.

Determining when and where a train meet occurs is also a classic mathematics problem.

== See also ==
- Passing loop
