= Lindaunis Bridge =

Road-rail bridge

Coordinates: 54°35′00″N 9°49′12″E

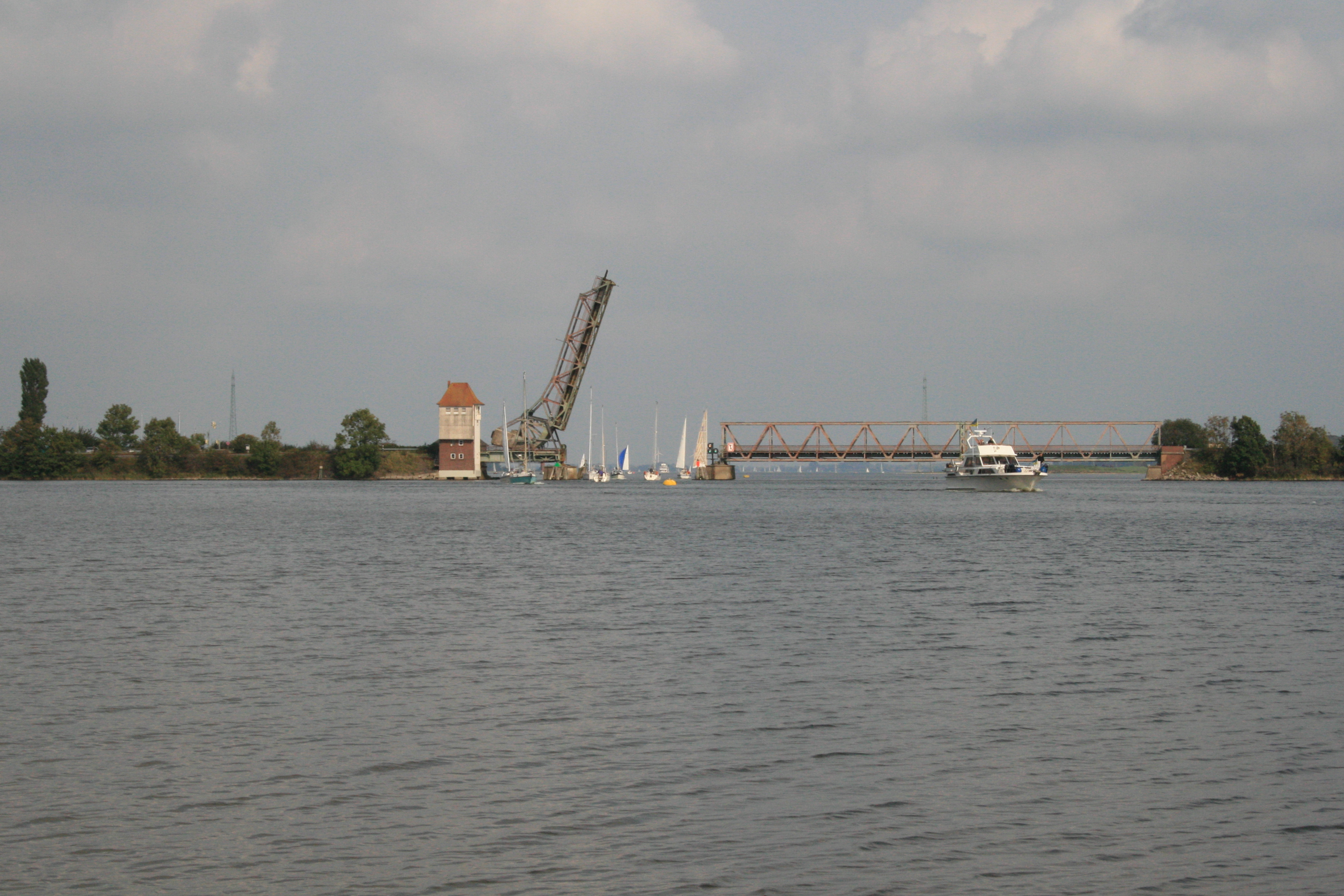
Bridge, facing west.

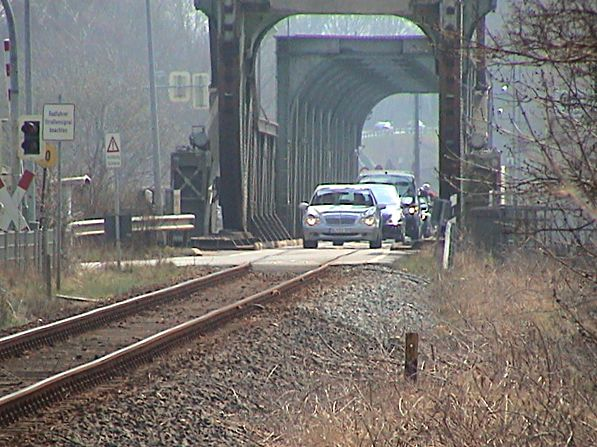
Car traffic crossing the bridge.

The Lindaunis Bridge (Danish: Lindånæsbroen) is a bascule bridge crossing the Schlei, an inlet of the Baltic Sea in Schleswig-Holstein, at one of its narrowest parts. The bridge thereby connects the Schwansen and Angeln regions. The steel bridge, that has been declared a monument in 1997, opened to traffic on 17 July 1927.

The bridge is special in the sense that it is used both by the hourly local train travelling along the Kiel-Flensburg railway, and by car traffic. The bridge opens at most once every hour for ships.

== History ==
The predecessor of the current bridge was built in 1881 and replaced in 1927 because the passage was not wide enough. The bridge consisted of two bowstring arch truss superstructures with a symmetric swing span in the middle.

== Replacement for the bridge ==
Due to frequent defects and because of the bridge is undersized for the increasing traffic it will be replaced by a new bridge. It will be also a bascule bridge with tracks on the road but there will be two lanes with a separate pedestrian and cycle track.
