= Danzka =

Danish vodka brand

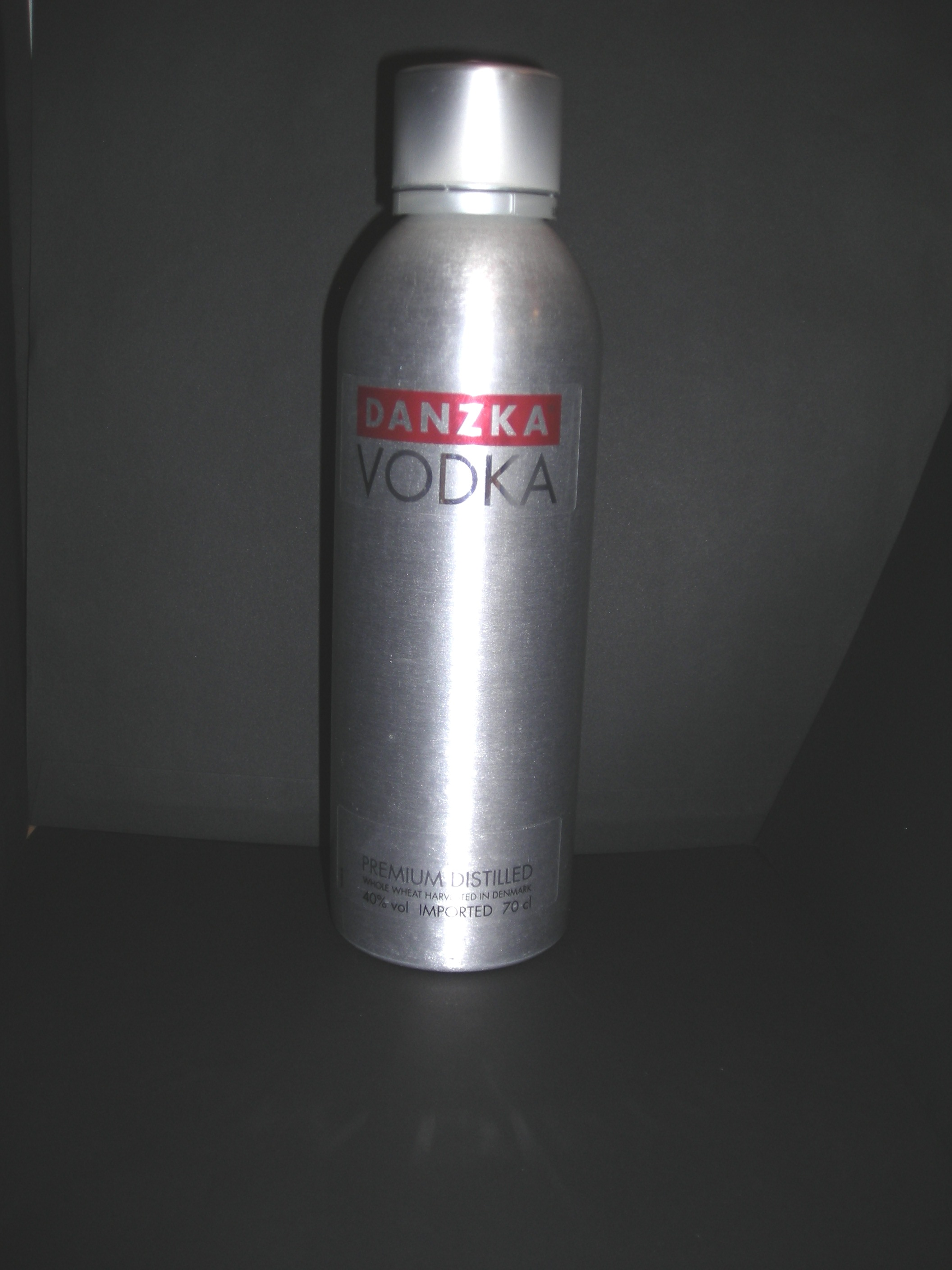
DANZKA Vodka anno 2011

Danzka is a Danish brand of vodka. It is made from Danish wheat, produced and bottled in Denmark, and exported World-wide. Danzka was produced for the first time in 1989, and although the brand is owned by Belvédère SA (France), it is still handled in Denmark by the Danish subsidiary, Belvédère Scandinavia A/S.

Danzka is sold in a brushed aluminium bottles, and the design is in keeping with Danish design.

The bottle design for Danzka has recently been updated, including a new logo created by Danish designer, Johannes Torpe. The new bottle is described as "an elegant, modern streamlined aluminium cylinder with striking shelf appeal" by Belvédère Duty Free Sales Director Torben Vedel Andersen.

The name is a wordplay on the word "dansk", simply meaning Danish, and the use of Z instead of S and "ka"-ending, that makes the word sound Slavic.

== Types ==
Danzka is available in 7 flavours:

- Danzka Vodka (red) - the original (40% ABV)
- Danzka Vodka Fifty (black) - increased alcohol content (50% ABV)
- Danzka Vodka Apple (green) - apple flavoured (40% ABV)
- Danzka Vodka Citrus (yellow) - lemon flavoured (40% ABV)
- Danzka Vodka Cranraz (fuchsia) - cranberry and raspberry flavoured (40% ABV)
- Danzka Vodka Currant (purple) - blackcurrant flavoured (40% ABV)
- Danzka Vodka Grapefruit (orange) - grapefruit flavoured (40% ABV)
