= Kiel–Flensburg railway =

Railway in Schleswig-Holstein, Germany

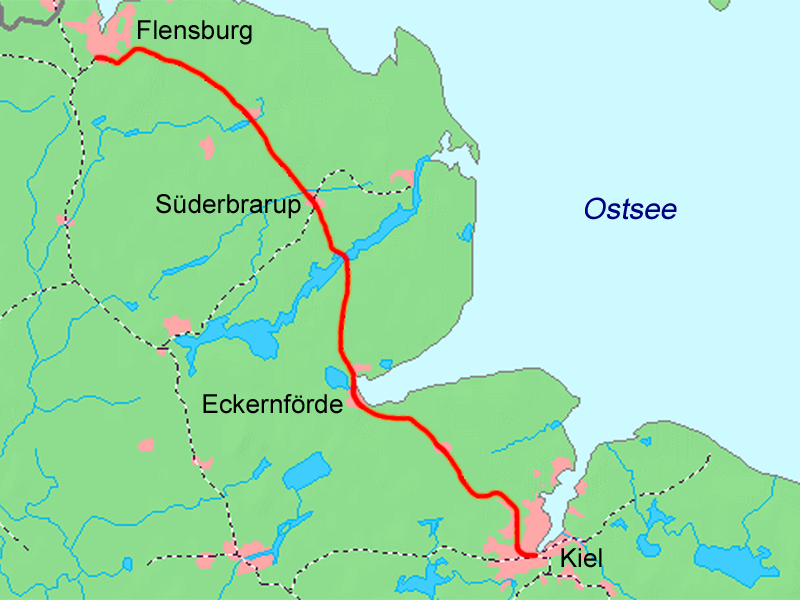

Overview
- Line number: 1020
- Locale: Schleswig-Holstein, Germany

Service
- Route number: 146

Technical
- Line length: 80.7 km (50.1 mi)
- Track gauge: 1,435 mm (4 ft 8 1/2 in) standard gauge

The Kiel–Flensburg railway is a single-track railway in Schleswig-Holstein, Germany. The railway connects the city of Kiel on the Baltic Sea with Eckernförde and Flensburg. Travel time over the 80 km (50 mi) railway is around 75 minutes with a maximum speed of 120 km/h (75 mph).

== Alignment ==
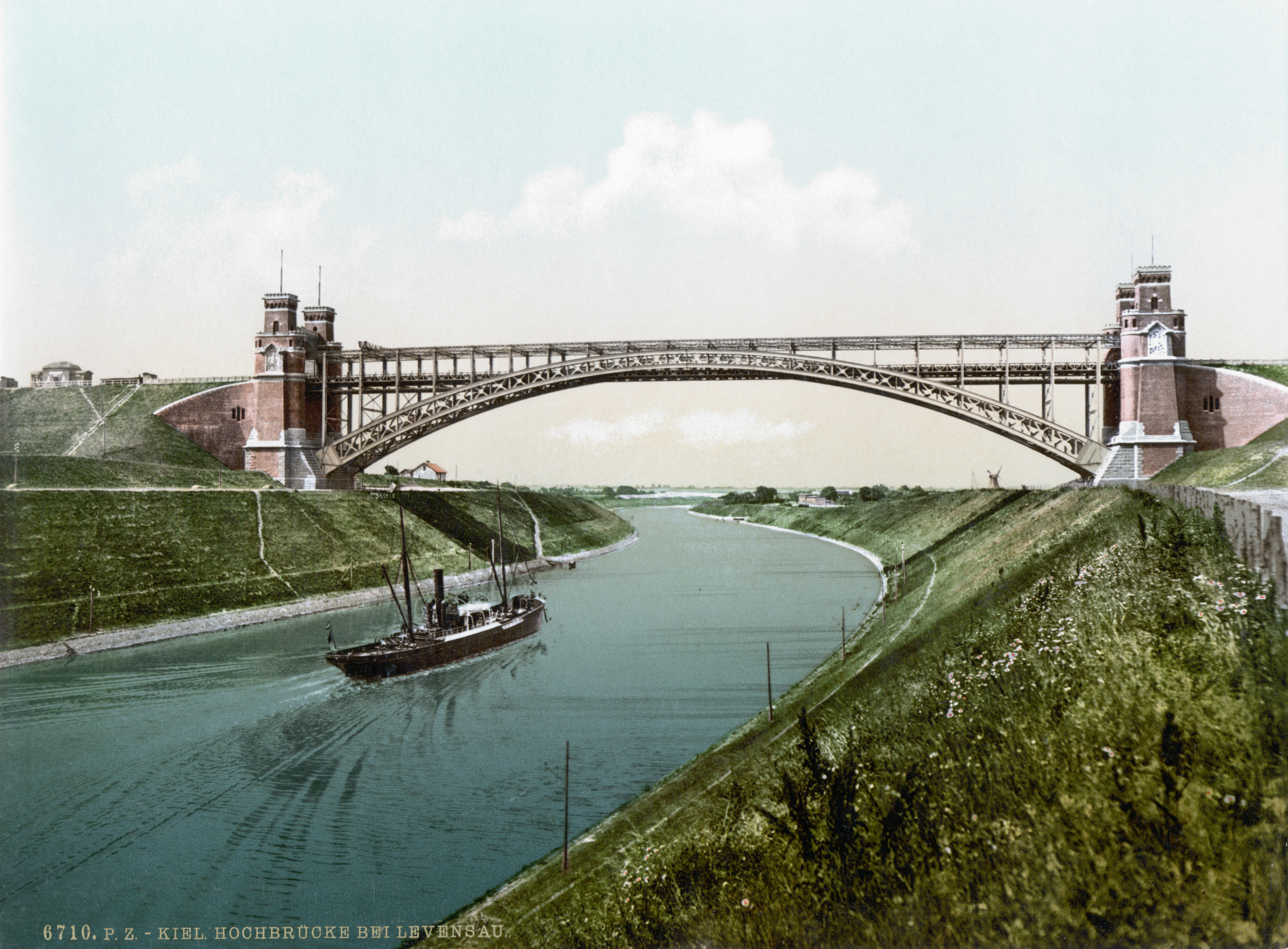
Levensau High Bridge

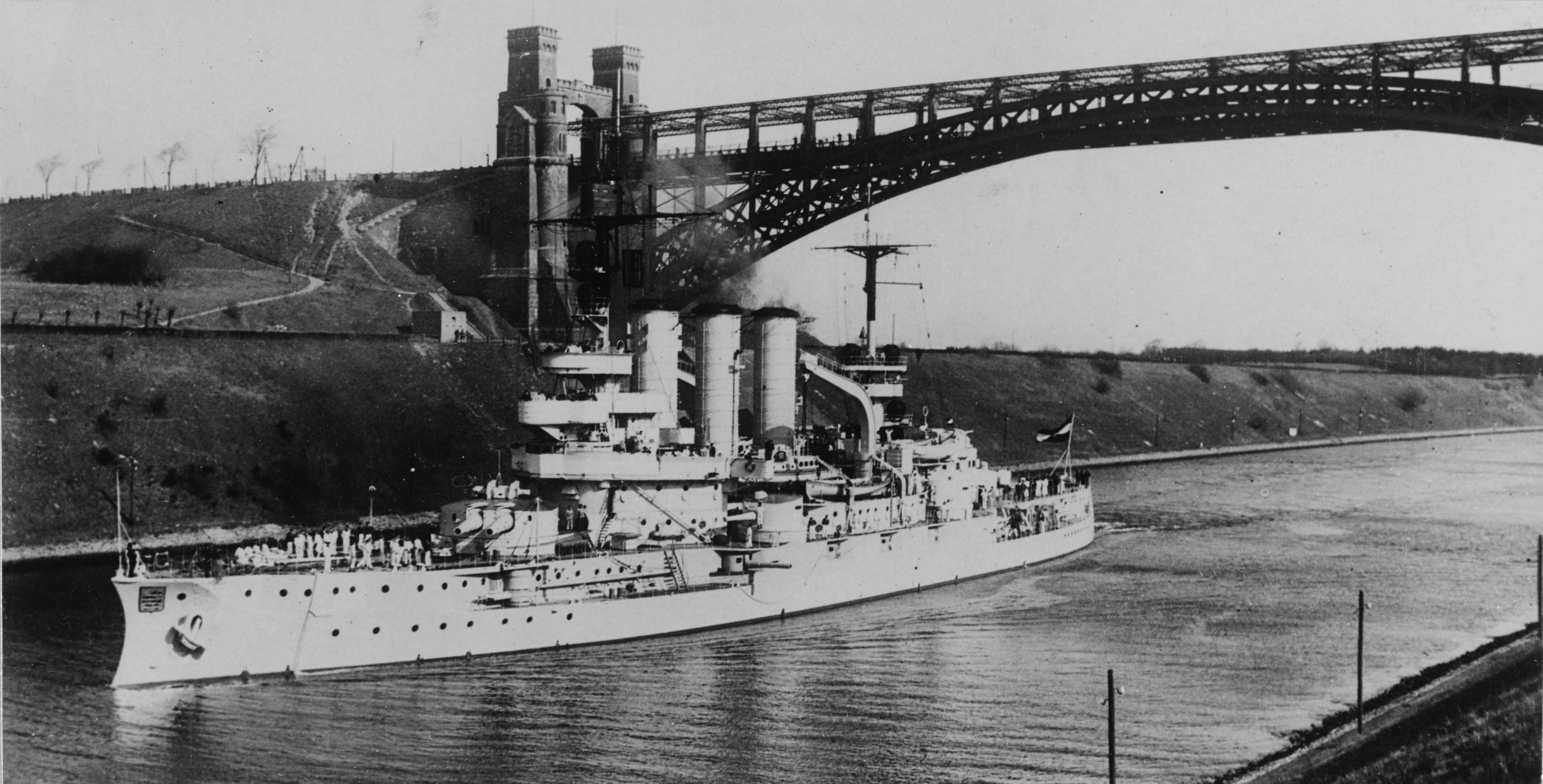
German battleship Hessen sails under Levensau High Bridge ca. 1925–1934

The railway crosses three peninsulas: from Kiel, it crosses the Kiel Canal and then traverses the Dänischer Wohld to Eckernförde. From that town to the Schlei it crosses Schwansen. North of the Schlei, the line runs through the typical landscape of Angeln, the location of the station of Süderbrarup. At the end point, Flensburg, the original terminal was at the Kiel Station, directly in the harbour. Since the current Flensburg station was completed in 1927, the railway now terminates there, entering from the east.

Important structures along the line are the Levensau High Bridge over the Kiel Canal and the Lindaunis Bridge crossing the Schlei, which is a combined road-rail bridge.

=== Connecting lines ===
==== Standard gauge ====
- Hamburg-Altona–Kiel railway
- Kiel–Lübeck railway
- Kiel-Hasee–Osterrönfeld railway
- Kappeln–Süderbrarup (Süderbrarup-Schleswig lifted)
- Jutland Railway (Flensburg-Padborg)
- Neumünster–Flensburg Railway

==== Narrow gauge ====
- Eckernförder Kreisbahnen (lifted)
- Sörup–Satrup Railway (lifted)
- Flensburger Kreisbahn (lifted)

== History ==
=== Prehistory and Construction ===
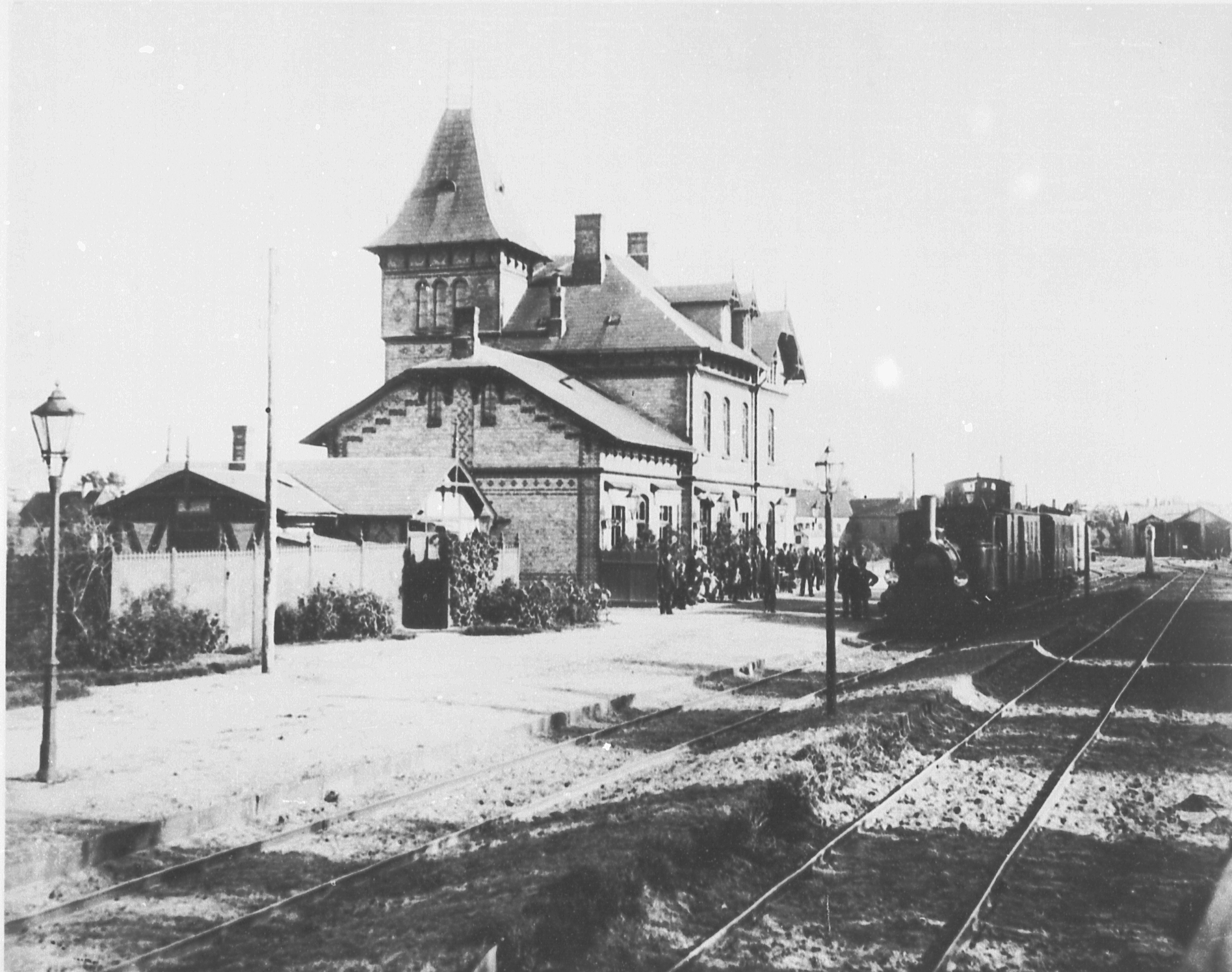
Historical station of Eckernförde (1887).

The Kiel-Eckernförde-Flensburger Eisenbahn-Gesellschaft (KEFE) was founded on 13 June 1878 in Kiel by the Prussian government, the local municipalities, and some individual investors. On 19 August 1878, little over two months later, the society received a concession to operate a standard-gauge railway from Kiel to Flensburg, running parallel to the Baltic Sea coast.

In 1881, ship traders in Kappeln on the Schlei successfully resisted the arrival of the new railway in their city, fearing a railway bridge would block the river. From 1885, that city became terminus of the narrow-gauge Flensburger Kreisbahn, that ran through Angeln. In addition, the Schleswiger Kreisbahn came to connect Kappeln to Schleswig, and the narrow gauge railway of the Eckernförder Kreisbahn connected it to neighbouring Eckernförde.

On 1 July 1881, the first stretch of the new railway was opened, from Kiel to Eckernförde; on 21 December 1881 the rest of the railway was opened; it now measured 79 km. (When the Kiel Canal was constructed, a diversion was necessary, lengthening the railway by another 2 km.) Traffic grew quickly, and on 1 July 1903 the Prussian state railways took over operation of the line.

=== Services ===
In 1986, the line received an hourly service for the first time, and the next year, all minor stations were closed (Kiel-Hassee, Kronshagen, (Kiel-)Suchsdorf, Neuwittenbek, Altenhof, Lindaunis, Mohrkirch, Winderatt, Husby und Maasbüll). This sped up traffic considerably. Trains were no longer pulled by locomotives, but mainly by trains of DB Class 628. Until 1999, one or two InterCity services on Fridays and Sundays connected Kiel with army camps in the area.

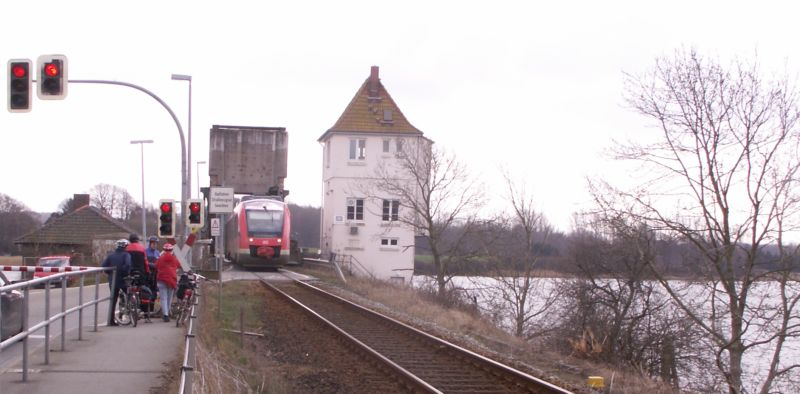
Train in Lindaunis.

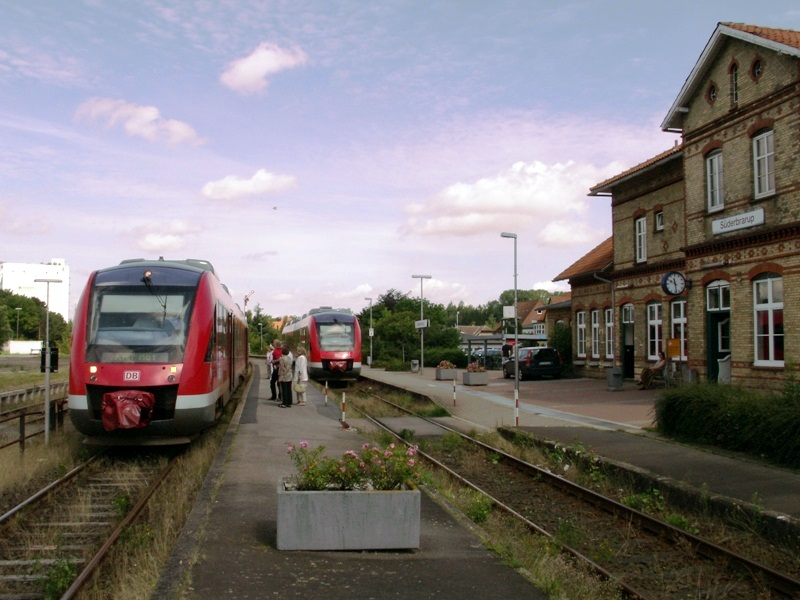
Trains crossing in Süderbrarup. Trains always cross here and in Gettorf.

In late 2007, the station at Kiel-Hassee was reopened (but 250 meters north of the old location, next to a new shopping mall), as Husby and Kiel-Suchsdorf had been several years earlier.

In early 2009, the stretch was run by the Regionalbahn Schleswig-Holstein; on 4 April 2009, the line was taken over by the Nord-Ostsee-Bahn, which received the line in exchange for the Hamburg-Kiel line. Trains run from Kiel to Flensburg, and additional hourly trains run between Kiel to Eckernförde, offering a half-hourly service between those towns.

=== Other developments ===
In July 2014, an electronic interlocking was opened at Lindaunis. This is controlled from Eckernförde.

At the timetable change in December 2014, a halt (Haltepunkt) was opened in Kronshagen on the site of a former halt.

The Kiel-Eckernförde section of the line is included in the Stadtbahn Kiel project, which aims at increased frequencies on local railways around Kiel, as well as connections across the city. There are plans to construct a new street-running section from around Suchsdorf station to Kiel University, from where trains would then follow Holtenauer Straße to reach the main station in Kiel. Further stations will be (re)opened at Eckernförde-Süd, Gettorf-Süd and Neuwittenbek.

== Rolling stock ==
The line is operated with DBAG Class 648, and sometimes with coupled DB Class 628.
