= Eckernförde =

Eckernförde Eckernföör (Low German) Egernførde (Danish)
- Town
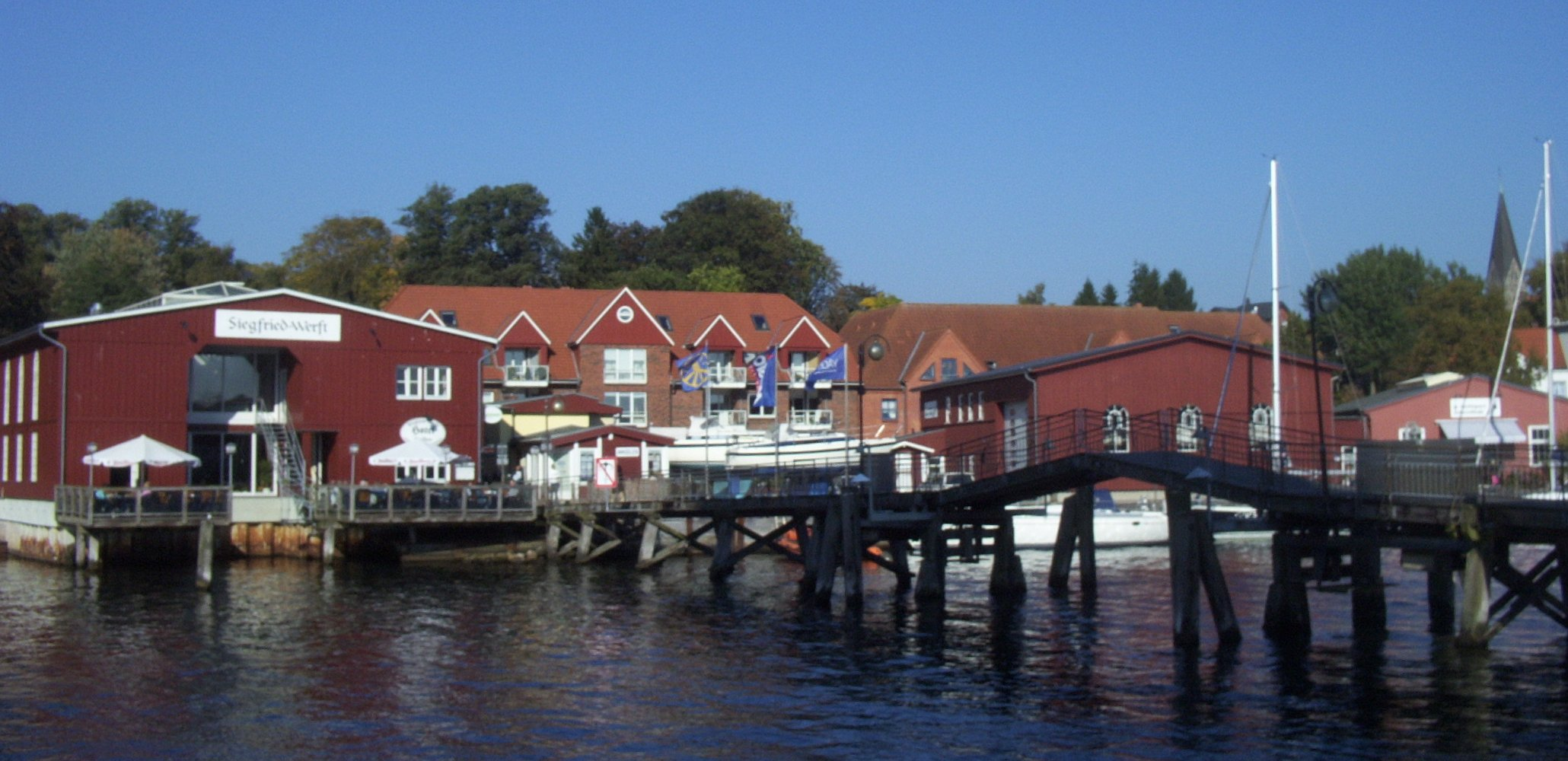
- Port of Eckernförde in mid-October 2005

- Coat of arms

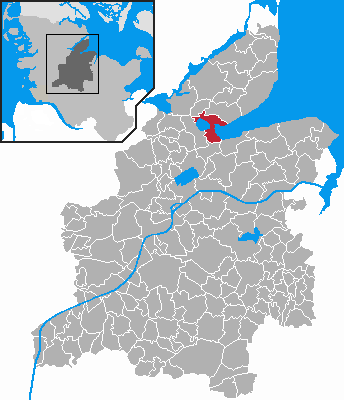
- Location of Eckernförde within Rendsburg-Eckernförde district
- Interactive map of Eckernförde
- Location within Germany Location within Schleswig-Holstein
- Coordinates: 54°28′27″N 9°50′16″E
- Country: Germany
- State: Schleswig-Holstein
- District: Rendsburg-Eckernförde

Government
  - Mayor: Iris Ploog (SPD)

Area
  - Total: 21.38 km^{2} (8.25 sq mi)
- Elevation: 21 m (69 ft)

Population (2025-12-31)
  - Total: 21,599
  - Density: 1,010/km^{2} (2,617/sq mi)
- Time zone: UTC+01:00 (CET)
  - Summer (DST): UTC+02:00 (CEST)
- Postal codes: 24340
- Dialling codes: 04351
- Vehicle registration: ECK
- Website: www.eckernfoerde.de

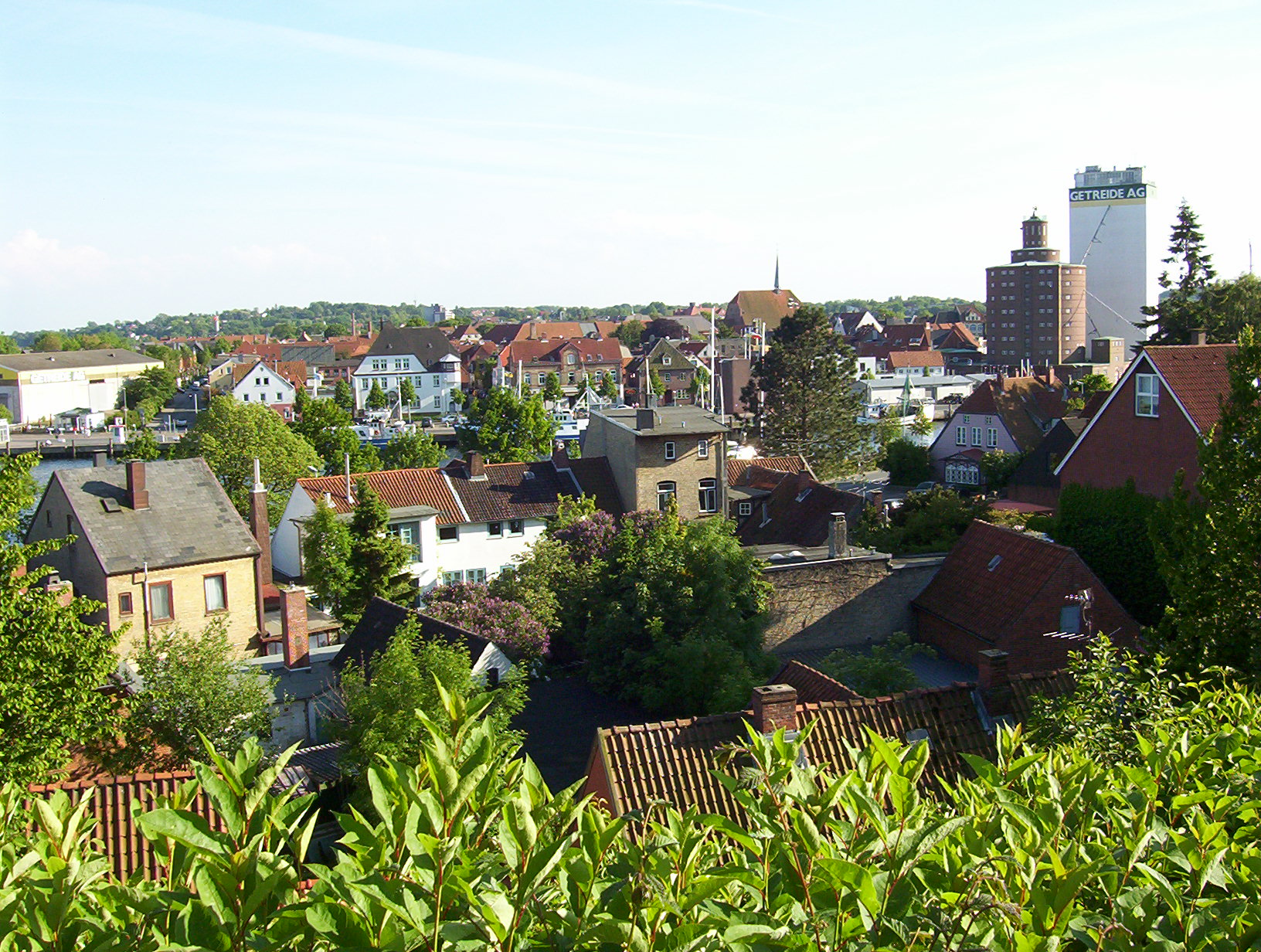
View of Borby, showing the harbour and historical town centre

Eckernförde (German pronunciation: [ɛkɐnˈføːɐ̯də]; Danish: Egernførde, sometimes also Egernfjord; Low German: Eckernför, sometimes also Eckernföör) is a city located in the Kreis of Rendsburg-Eckernförde, Schleswig-Holstein, northern Germany. Situated on the coast of the Baltic Sea, approximately 30 km north-west of Kiel, it has a population of about 23,000. Eckernförde is a popular tourist destination.

== Name ==
The name of Eckernförde is of mixed origin, but derived from the name of a Danish castle formerly located near the current town, which is also reflected in the name of the town district of Borby. This fortification is listed in the 13th-century Liber Census Daniæ (Danish Census Book) as Ykærnæburgh. In 1441, the town used an official seal listing its name as Eherneborgh. The first syllable corresponds to the modern Danish word "egern" meaning squirrel, while "-förde" is Low German meaning fjord. The -förde ending is documented in Latinized form on two official seals used by the town in 1602 and 1624. The etymology of the town's name is reflected in the presence of a squirrel in the town's coat of arms, a feature first documented by the 1441 seal.

== History ==
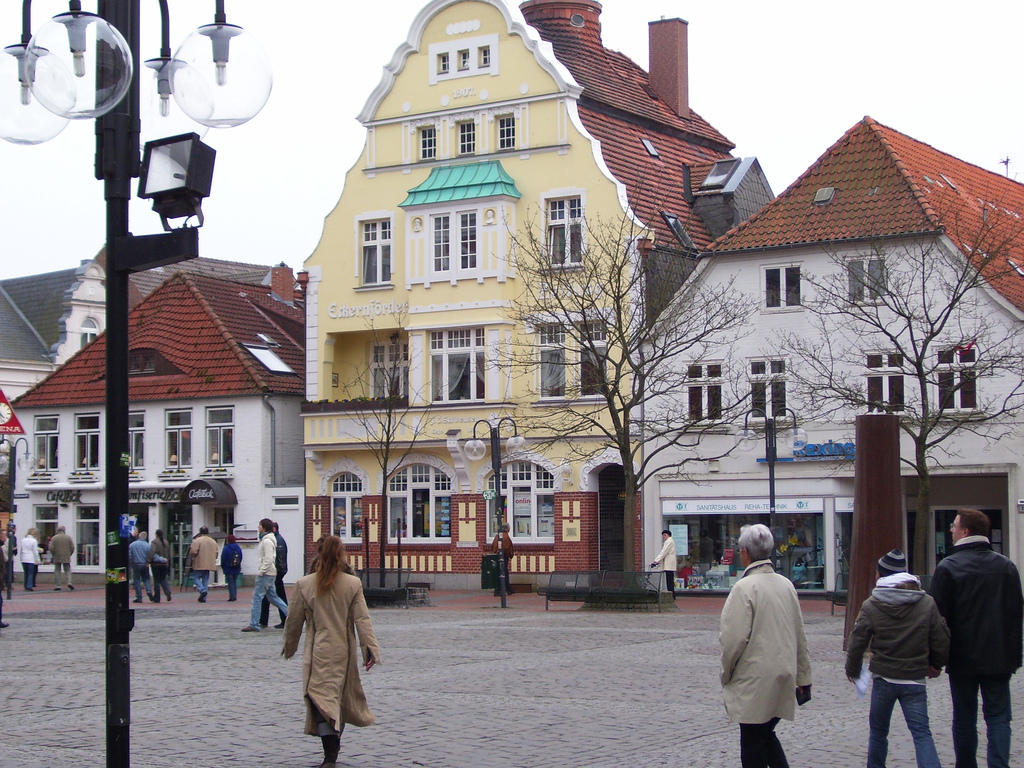
Eckernförde Rathausmarkt (market place)

- In 1197, Eckernförde was mentioned in a written manner for the first time.
- Eckernförde was mentioned in the year 1302 for the first time explicitly as a city, but in 1288 the inhabitants were already called oppidani (city citizen).
- In 1628, it was taken by Christian IV of Denmark from the troops of the Holy Roman Empire.
- During the First War of Schleswig two Danish ships, the Christian VIII and the frigate Gefion tried to land in Eckernförde in April 1849. They were cannonaded from the shore. The Christian VIII exploded, while the Gefion surrendered and was captured. Theodor Preusser, the commander in chief of the southern troops, died while rescuing Danish troops from the Christian VIII.
- On November 13, the 1872 Baltic Sea flood hit the coast of the Baltic Sea from Denmark to Pomerania. Of all the German coastal settlements, Eckernförde was most heavily damaged due to its location on Eckernförde Bay which is wide open to the north-east. The entire town was flooded, 78 houses were destroyed, 138 damaged and 112 families became homeless.
- The Count Saint-Germain was buried in Eckernförde near St. Nicolai Church. His grave was destroyed by the 1872 storm surge.
- In 1934, the seaside resort Borby was incorporated.
- After the Second World War a United Nations displaced persons camp for Estonians was located near Eckernförde, where a section of the Hohenstein mansion was converted into a maternity ward.

== Mayors ==
- 1906–1914: Karl Heldmann (1872-1914)
- 1920–1921: Willers Jessen (temporary)
- 1921–1926: Curt Pönitzsch
- July–September 1926: Wilhelm Kuhr (temporary)
- 1926–1931: Walther Heinn (temporary)
- 1931–1933: Wilhelm Sievers, (1896-1966), NSDAP
- 1933–1938: Helmut Lemke, (1907-1990), NSDAP
- 1938–1943: Friedrich Böhm, NSDAP (time of office till 1945)
- 1943–1945: Heinz Loewer, NSDAP (temporary)
- since June 1945: Hans Ohm (temporary)
- since August 1945 Ewald Wendenburg (temporary)
- since April 1946: Heinrich Schumacher KPD
- since September 1946: Daniel Hinrichsen, CDU
- April 1950–September 1952: Ewald Wendenburg, CDU
- 1952–1966 Werner Schmidt, (1911-1990), independent, then FDP
- 1966–1969: Hans Wiedemann, independent
- 1969–1987: Kurt Schulz, SPD
- 1987–1998: Klaus Buß, (born 1942), SPD
- 1998–1999: Ingrid Ehlers, SPD (temporary)
- 1999–2006: Susanne Jeske-Paasch, (born 1958), SPD
- 2007-2023: Jörg Sibbel, (born 1965), independent, then CDU
- since 2023: Iris Ploog, (born 1979), SPD

== Economy ==
In the early 20th century, Eckernförde was known for its harbour, fishing, trade in agricultural products, and manufacture of salt and iron goods.

All German Navy submarines form part of 1st Ubootgeschwader and are stationed in Eckernförde. It is the home of BEHN, an alcoholic beverage family company, founded in 1792. The headquarters of SIG Sauer are also located there.

== Education ==
Schools in the city include the Richard-Vosgerau-Schule. The Richard Vosgerau School is a public elementary school in Eckernförde. The address is 26 Bergstraße, 24340 Eckernförde. The current head of the school is Mrs. Koepke. The school building consists of a white main house and a small outbuilding as well as a football field and a sports hall. In the schoolyard, the school children enjoy various activities, ranging from slides to climbing. Other schools in Eckernförde include:

- Fritz-Reuter-Schule (primary and regional school)
- Waldorf School
- Gudewerdt Schule (primary and community school)
- Pestalozzi Schule (special school)
- Schule am Noor (special school)
- Jungmannschule (high school)
- Peter-Ustinov-Schule (community school)
- Sprottenschule (primary school)
- Jes Kruse-Skolen (Danish private school)

== Transport ==
The Kiel–Flensburg railway runs through the town with trains stopping at Eckernförde station, situated to the west of the town centre. The town's main bus station, central omnibus station (German: ZOB), is directly connected to the train station. The operating company of the railway network is Deutsche Bahn. Eckernförde has 4 bus routes for urban connections operated by single-deck buses. Eckernförde has no trams or trolley-buses. For transportation, the statewide Schleswig-Holstein-fare applies. A taxi stand is located at the bus station. Eckernförde has two bike rental outlets, one is located near the beach and one is in the pedestrian area.

The nearest international Airport is Hamburg Airport.

== Twin towns – sister cities ==
Eckernförde is twinned with:

- Bützow, Germany (1990)
- Hässleholm, Sweden (1958)
- Tanga, Tanzania (1963)

== Notable people ==
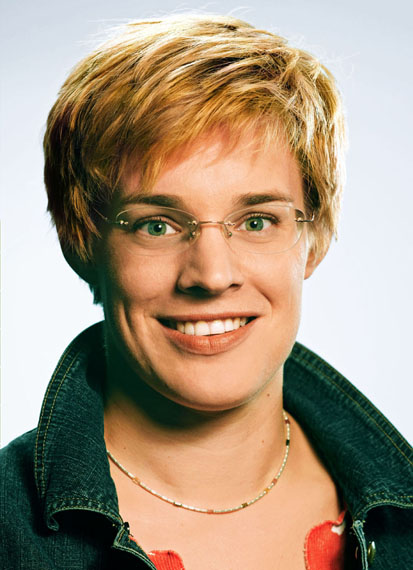
Grietje Staffelt, 2006

- Count of St. Germain, aristocrat and adventurer, died here in 1784
- Georg Gerlach (1797–1865), a Danish officer.
- Lorenz von Stein (1815–1890), economist, sociologist, and public administration scholar.
- Karl Wilhelm Valentiner (1845–1931), astronomer
- Frederick G. Clausen (1856–1940), German-American architect
- Walter von Bülow-Bothkamp (1894–1918), fighter pilot in WWI, winner of Pour le Mérite
- Ruth Halbsguth (1916–2003), swimmer, team silver medallist at the 1936 Summer Olympics
- Inge Viett (born 1944), former member of the "Red Army Faction" (RAF)
- Christoph, Prince of Schleswig-Holstein (born 1949), head of the House of Glücksburg since 1980
- Horst-Dieter Kolletschke (born 1952), a retired rear admiral of the German Navy.
- Grietje Staffelt (born 1975), politician (Alliance 90/The Greens), former Bundestag member
- Ingmar Zahorsky (born 1983), photojournalist and media artist
- Michael Schulte (born 1990), singer and songwriter
