= Bokhorst (Amt) =

- Former amt
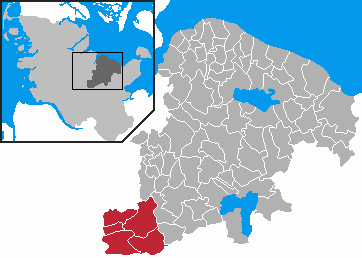
- Map of Plön highlighting Bokhorst
- Country: Germany
- State: Schleswig-Holstein
- District: Plön
- Disestablished: 1 January 2008
- Region seat: Schillsdorf

Area
  - Total: 85 km^{2} (33 sq mi)

Bokhorst was an Amt ("collective municipality") in the district of Plön, in Schleswig-Holstein, Germany. It was situated approximately 25 km south of Kiel. The seat of the Amt was Schillsdorf. In January 2008, it was merged with the Amt Wankendorf to form the Amt Bokhorst-Wankendorf.

The Amt Bokhorst consisted of the following municipalities (population as of 2005):

- Bönebüttel (2.042 inhabitants)
- Großharrie (567 inhabitants)
- Rendswühren (793 inhabitants)
- Schillsdorf (896 inhabitants)
- Tasdorf (363 inhabitants)
