= Wankendorf (Amt) =

Coordinates: 54.117°N 10.208°E

- Former amt
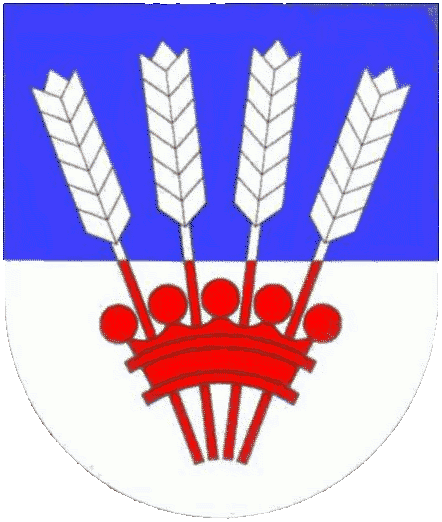
- Coat of arms

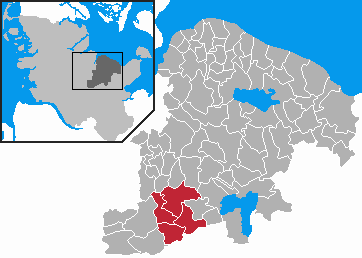
- Map of Plön highlighting Wankendorf
- Country: Germany
- State: Schleswig-Holstein
- District: Plön
- Disestablished: 1 January 2008
- Region seat: Wankendorf

Area
  - Total: 65 km^{2} (25 sq mi)

Wankendorf was an Amt ("collective municipality") in the district of Plön, in Schleswig-Holstein, Germany. The seat of the Amt was in Wankendorf. In January 2008, it was merged with the Amt Bokhorst to form the Amt Bokhorst-Wankendorf.

The Amt Wankendorf consisted of the following municipalities:

1. Belau
2. Ruhwinkel
3. Stolpe
4. Wankendorf
