= 24601 (disambiguation) =

24601 may refer to:

- 24601, prisoner number of Jean Valjean in Les Misérables
- 24601 Valjean, a minor planet
- "24601", a high school show by Crimson Regiment Band and Guard
- "24601", a ZIP code from Amonate, Virginia
- "24601", a postal code for Belau, Schleswig-Holstein
- "24601", a postal code for Ruhwinkel, Schleswig-Holstein
- "24601", a postal code for Stolpe, Schleswig-Holstein
- "24601", a postal code for Wankendorf, Schleswig-Holstein
