= Gönnebek =

- Municipality
- Coat of arms

- Location of Gönnebek within Segeberg district
- Interactive map of Gönnebek
- Location within Germany Location within Schleswig-Holstein
- Coordinates: 54°3′3″N 10°10′38″E
- Country: Germany
- State: Schleswig-Holstein
- District: Segeberg
- Municipal assoc.: Bornhöved

Government
  - Mayor: Knut Hamann

Area
  - Total: 14.87 km^{2} (5.74 sq mi)
- Elevation: 36 m (118 ft)

Population (2025-12-31)
  - Total: 562
  - Density: 37.8/km^{2} (97.9/sq mi)
- Time zone: UTC+01:00 (CET)
  - Summer (DST): UTC+02:00 (CEST)
- Postal codes: 24610
- Dialling codes: 04323
- Vehicle registration: SE
- Website: www.amt- bornhoeved.de

Gönnebek is a municipality in the district of Segeberg, in Schleswig-Holstein, Germany. Its first documentary mention was in 1394.

Gönnebek is part of the Amt ("collective municipality") Bornhöved.

It is situated approximately 15 km east of Neumünster. The next train station is located in Rickling.

Neighbouring villages (clockwise beginning north) are Rendswühren, Bornhöved, Trappenkamp, Rickling and Groß Kummerfeld.
