= Baltic-British Agricultural School =

Agricultural school in Germany

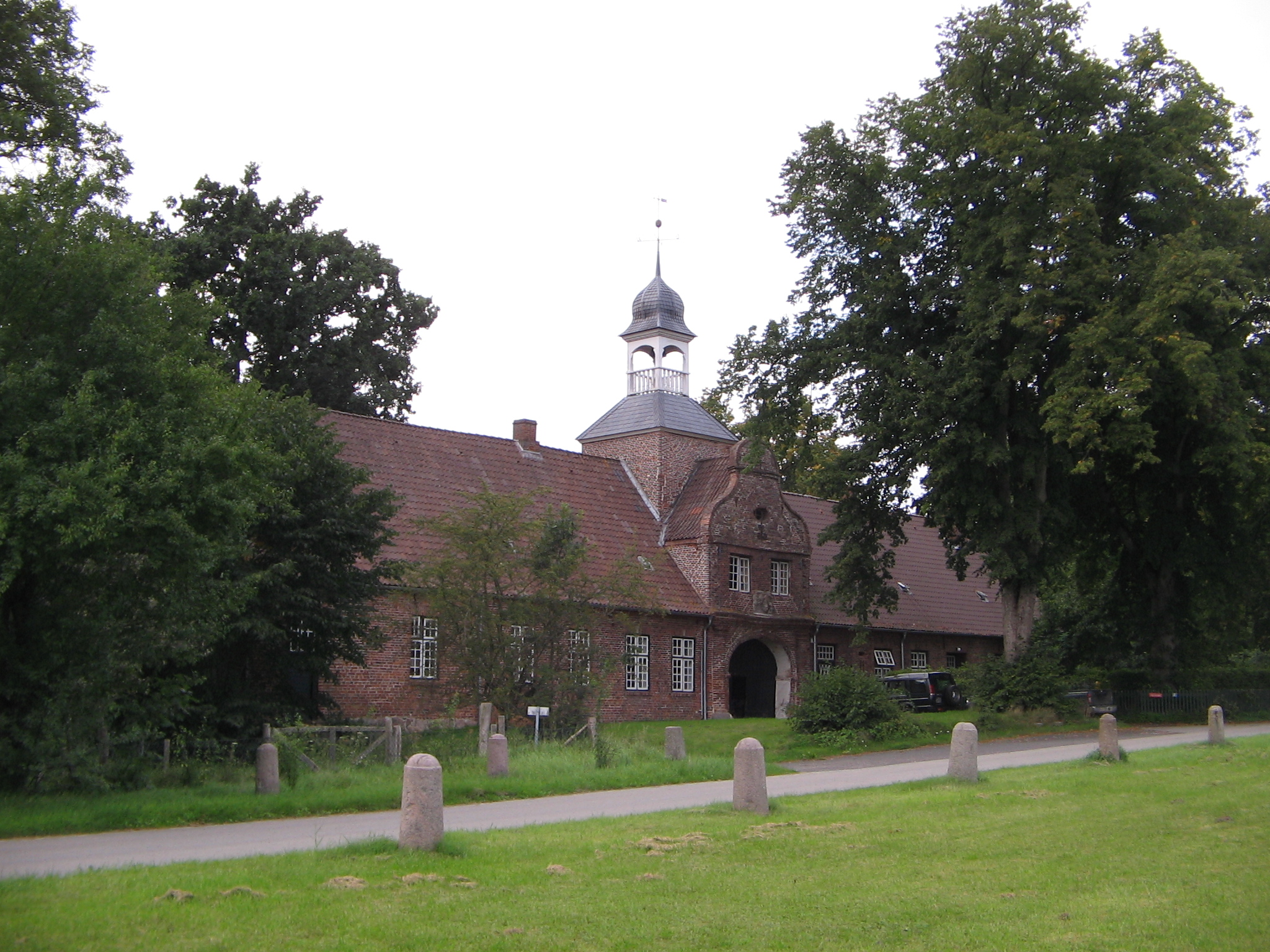
Belau, Perdöl Manor, gatehouse

From 1945 to 1950, the Baltic-British Agricultural School on Perdoel estate in Belau near Wankendorf, Schleswig-Holstein trained former prisoners of war of the Second World War from the Baltic states in Germany who did not wish to return to their Soviet-occupied homeland in modern agricultural and horticultural techniques.

== Beginnings ==
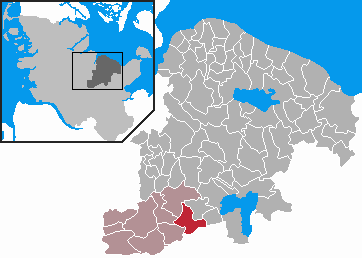
Map of the municipality of Belau, Plön (district), Schleswig-Holstein

The origins of the agricultural school began with a forced labor camp for Baltic prisoners of war on Perdoel Manorat the time of Nazi Germany. The camp was little known in the region as the estate was quite isolated from the nearest larger town Wankendorf in Plön (district).

After the end of the war, the British Occupying Power founded the first vocational school for displaced persons in Schleswig-Holstein, mostly refugees and former forced labourers from the Baltic states, but also from Poland and Hungary, in spring of 1946 on Perdoel Manor in the Wankendorf department, one of the oldest noble estates in the country, which had been owned by a soap making dynasty from Itzehoe since June 1902.

== Prime ==
As the wooden barracks of the former forced labourers camps were not sufficient, the British military had additional Quonset huts built. From now on, the manor house accommodated the school rooms in addition to the offices of the British supervisory authority. The Estonian agronomist Aksel Mägiste, appointed headmaster by the British, taught animal husbandry and agriculture. The administration was set up in a wooden hut in the estate park next to the manor house.

The school had permission to use the estate's fields, stables and animals for its lessons. In return for their auxiliary work, the pupils received food in kind, which was prepared in the estate's kitchen.

A local YMCA, founded by dedicated refugees, published its own Perdoel magazine by the beginning of 1948 at the latest: the Vagu. Eesti Pollunduskooli Ajakiri (Eng. "The Furrow ", an Estonian agricultural magazine). From then on, reports on agriculture, notes from other camps, etc. were published for at least a year. The editors were W. Reiman, E. Haevaniit and C. Tiidemann.

== Decline ==
The Agriculture School Perdoel continued as an agricultural school until February 1948. Then, due to the increasingly tense refugee situation in Schleswig-Holstein, the British were forced to find another solution for the refugees. The American IRO (International Refugee Organization) now not only promoted the resettlement of refugees to the classic immigration countries, such as the US, Canada, Argentina or to Israel, but also offered them like commodities as willing and cheap labour in these countries.

A representative of the IRO, the Frenchman M. Bartho, declared numerous camps to be 'vocational training centres', i.e. training centre for willing emigrants, including the school at the Perdoel estate with 150 people. Six-month intensive courses in arable farming, horticulture, cattle breeding and dairy farming taught the skills needed to find work in agriculture abroad.

However, headmaster Märdiste felt that a proper education was no longer guaranteed and planned to emigrate, especially as he saw no future for himself and his family in Germany, which was overcrowded with refugees and badly damaged. In December 1949, the family emigrated to Canada.

However, the school at Perdoel Manor remained in place for the time being. When the last camps and schools were handed over to the German authorities on 1 July 1950, all traces of the Perdoel Agricultural School disappeared. As for food and agriculture in Nazi Germany, the forced labor of imported workers was responsible for about 20 percent of the food production in Germany during the war.
