= Alte Schwentine =

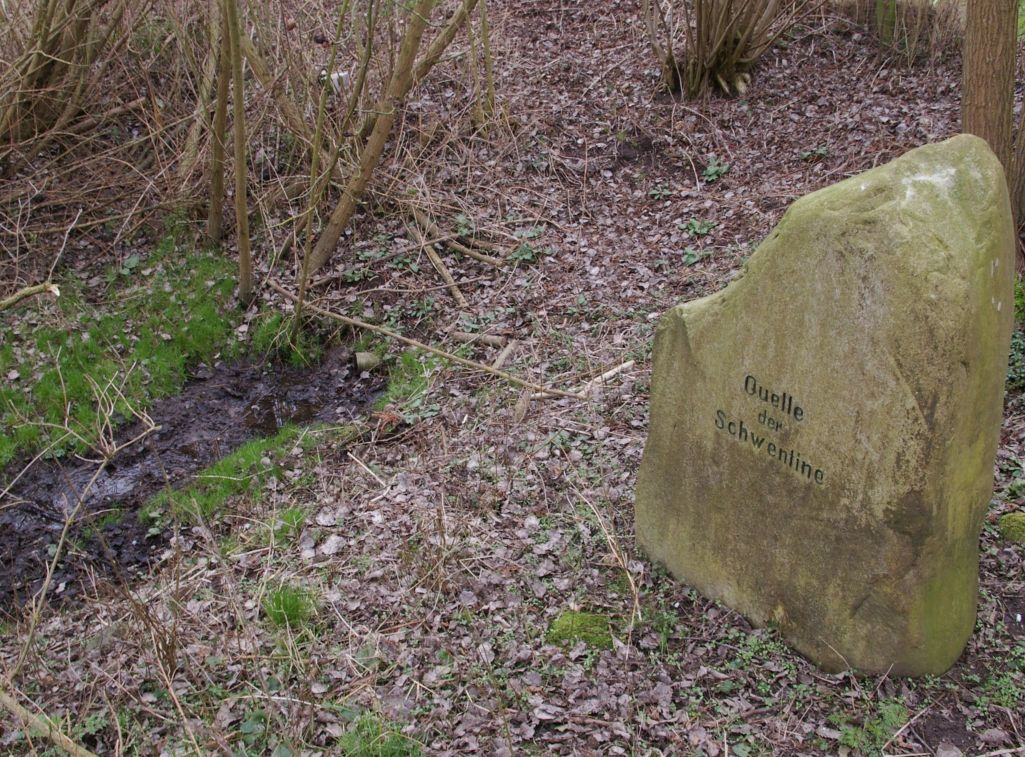
- Source of the Alte Schwentine near Bornhöved

Location
- Country: Germany
- State: Schleswig-Holstein

Physical characteristics
- Source
  - location: Grimmelsberg near Bornhöved
- Mouth
  - location: At Preetz into the Schwentine
  - coordinates: 54°14′16″N 10°17′08″E

Basin features
- Progression: Schwentine→ Baltic Sea
- Waterbodies: Lakes: Bornhöveder See, Schmalensee, Belauer See, Stolper See, Postsee

The Alte Schwentine ("Old Schwentine") is a river in the region of Holstein in North Germany. Its different sections are also known as the Bornau, Depenau, Kührener Au, Postau and Mühlenau.

== Course ==
It rises near Bornhöved on the hill of Grimmelsberg by the road from Bornhöved to Tarbek in a meadow and in the mill pond of Bornhöved. Initially, it flows through the Bornhöveder See and from there to the Schmalensee. From there it flows past former Slavic Belauburg into the Belauer See. Behind the lake it passes the Perdöl Mill, an old water mill, and flows into the Stolper See in an old carr wood at Perdöl Manor House (Gut Perdöl). It leaves the Stolper See at Depenau Mill and flows past Depenau Moor (Depenauer Hochmoor) towards Depenau Manor House (Gut Depenau). Beyond the manor house the river is also called the Kühren Au and meanders through meadows to the west of the town of Preetz located on the Postsee lake. Here it joins the Schwentine, which rises on the Bungsberg and empties into the Kiel Fjord in the Baltic Sea.

Between Postsee and Schwentine the names Postau or Mühlenau (after the old water mill of Preetz Priory which stood nearby) are used.

== Names ==
This use of different names came about as a result of a mistake by the cartographer, Caspar Danckwerth, who, in 1652, gave the real Schwentine — associated with Sventanafeld, the field of battle at the Battle of Bornhöved, different names such as the Bornhöved Bornau, Depenau, Kühren Au and Mühlenau. As a result the Bungsberg Schwentine was declared to be the real Schwentine.

== Limes ==
A section of the Limes Saxoniae, the fortified border rampart between Saxons and Wends, which was built by the Emperor Charlemagne, ran along the chain of lakes on the Old Schwentine.

== See also ==
- List of rivers of Schleswig-Holstein
