= Schwale =

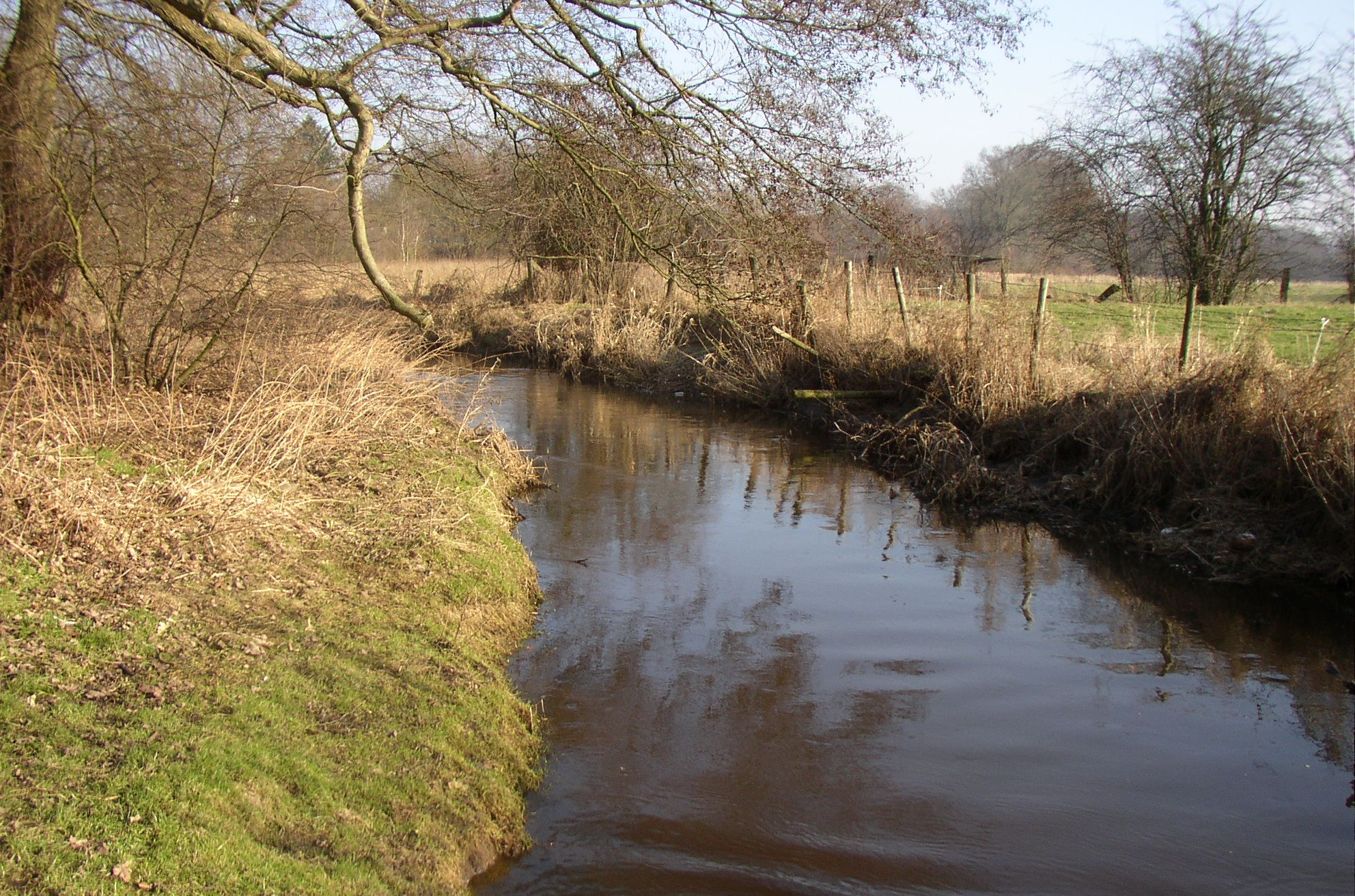
- River Schwale in Neumünster-Brachenfeld

Location
- Country: Germany
- States: Schleswig-Holstein

Physical characteristics
- Source
  - location: near Gönnebek
- Mouth
  - location: in Neumünster into Stör
  - coordinates: 54.0529°N 9.9429°E
- Length: 16 km (9.9 mi)

Basin features
- Progression: Stör→ Elbe→ North Sea
- Tributaries
  - right: Dosenbek

The Schwale is an approximately 16 kilometer long river in Schleswig-Holstein, Germany. The origin is in the district Segeberg close to Gönnebek, the confluence with the Stör is in the independent town Neumünster. In the centre of Neumünster the river is dammed to an artificial lake from the medieval times to operate a water mill.

== See also ==
- List of rivers of Schleswig-Holstein
