= Pulsedriver =

Slobodan Petrovic Jr.
- Also known as: Pulsedriver, DJ Tibby, Topmodelz, Don Esteban, Sal De Sol, Pinball
- Born: 22 February 1974 (age 51); Trappenkamp, Schleswig-Holstein, Germany
- Genres: Eurodance
- Occupation(s): DJ; Record producer Remixer
- Years active: 1989–present
- Labels: Aqualoop Records

Pulsedriver "Whistle Song" (2006)

Slobodan Petrovic Jr. (born 22 February 1974 in Trappenkamp) is a Yugoslav-German electronic dance music DJ, producer and is the founder of Aqualoop Records in 2000. He is best known by his alias, Pulsedriver.

== Career ==
=== Early life and career ===
In 1994, Petrovic released his first single, under the alias Aqualoop: "Twilight Zone". Further singles were released under this name.

In 1997, the project "Pulsedriver" was born.

The first commercial success came with the single "Kiss That Sound" which was his first entry into the German sales chart. Further follow-up releases "I Dominate U", "Take U High" and "Your Spirit is Shining" were also successful. The single "Cambodia", a cover of a Kim Wilde song, gave him his first Top 10 single in Germany, a Top 5 single in Austria and achieved chart positions in other countries in Europe. Further singles, such as "Din Daa Daa", "Time", "Move for Freedom", "Galaxy", "Vagabonds", "Slammin'", "Insane" and "Beat Bangs" as well as the albums Selected, Sequence and Night Moves all made it into the sales chart.

=== 2000-present ===
In the 2000s, Pulsedriver founded the record label Aqualoop Records. Pulsedriver was named "Best National Remixer" in the years 2002, 2003 and 2004 in succession. Currently Pulsedriver has made over 200 remixes for acts worldwide.

Petriovic has had over 25 releases featured in international sales charts.

=== Projects ===
- Aqualoop
- Beatmachine
- Dance United
- Diabolito
- DJ Tibby
- Don Esteban
- Driver & Face
- Eve
- Future Trance United
- Hard Body Babes
- Hardhead
- Jack Attack
- Killa Squad
- Klubbdriver
- La Vallée
- Lagos
- Limelight
- Liquid Motion
- Malibu Drive
- Matisse
- Minotaurus
- Monolith
- Overtune
- Pinball
- Pornrockers
- Riphouse
- Sal De Sol
- Secret Service
- Skagen Inc.
- T-Bone
- The Trancecore Project
- Tommy & Tibby
- Topmodelz
- Trans Balear
- Tube
- Typ Of Terra
