= Stolper See =

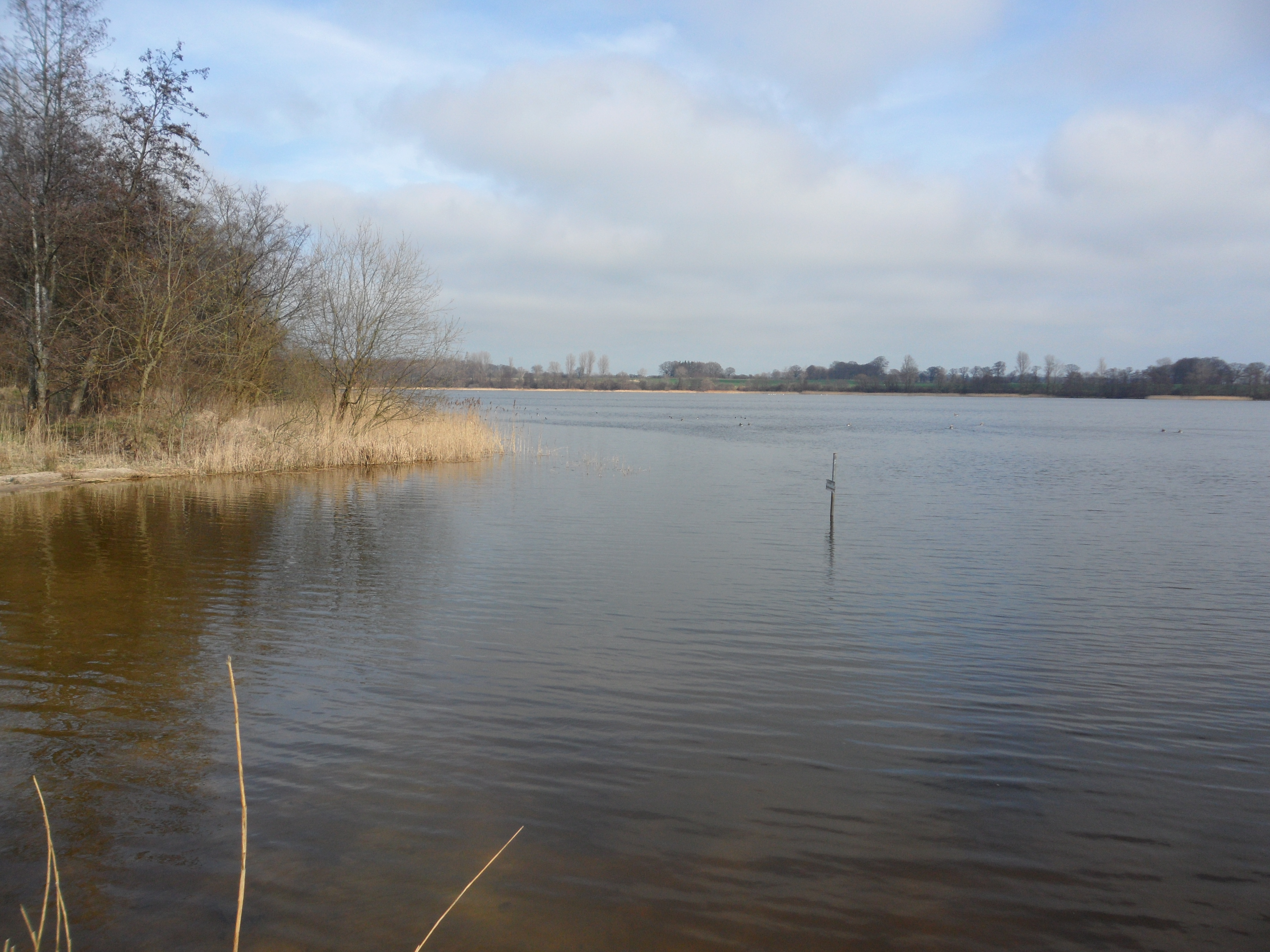
- Stolper See from village Stolpe

- Location within Schleswig-Holstein
- Location: Kreis Plön, Schleswig-Holstein
- Coordinates: 54°7′38.24″N 10°13′51.44″E
- Primary inflows: Alte Schwentine
- Primary outflows: Alte Schwentine
- Basin countries: Germany
- Max. length: 6 km (3.7 mi)
- Max. width: 1.5 km (0.93 mi)
- Surface area: 133.4 ha (330 acres)
- Average depth: 6.76 m (22.2 ft)
- Max. depth: 15 m (49 ft)

Stolper See is a lake in Kreis Plön, Schleswig-Holstein, Germany, to the east of the eponymous village of Stolpe. The lake covers an area of 133.4 hectares, a maximum depth of 14.97 metres, and is 27 metres above sea level.
