= Damsdorf =

- Municipality
- Coat of arms

- Location of Damsdorf within Segeberg district
- Interactive map of Damsdorf
- Location within Germany Location within Schleswig-Holstein
- Coordinates: 54°4′N 10°19′E
- Country: Germany
- State: Schleswig-Holstein
- District: Segeberg
- Municipal assoc.: Bornhöved

Government
  - Mayor: Jürgen Kaack

Area
  - Total: 7.76 km^{2} (3.00 sq mi)
- Elevation: 51 m (167 ft)

Population (2025-12-31)
  - Total: 233
  - Density: 30.0/km^{2} (77.8/sq mi)
- Time zone: UTC+01:00 (CET)
  - Summer (DST): UTC+02:00 (CEST)
- Postal codes: 23824
- Dialling codes: 04323
- Vehicle registration: SE
- Website: www.amt- bornhoeved.de

Damsdorf is a municipality in the district of Segeberg, in Schleswig-Holstein, Germany.
