= Bokhorst-Wankendorf =

- Amt
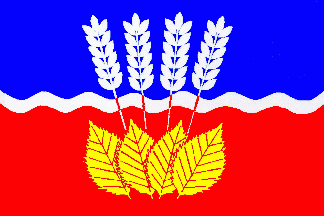
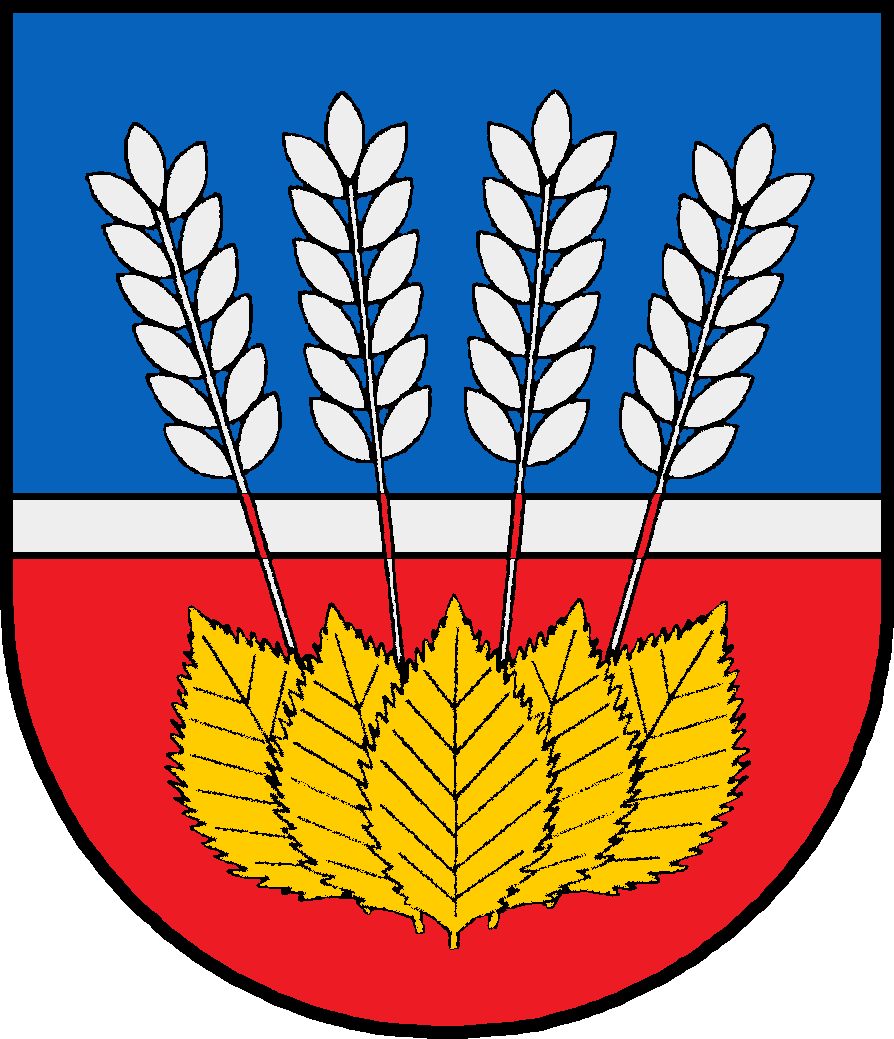
- Flag Coat of arms

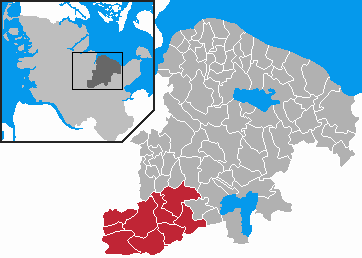
- Map of Plön highlighting Bokhorst-Wankendorf
- Interactive map of Bokhorst-Wankendorf
- Location within Germany Location within Schleswig-Holstein
- Coordinates: 54°07′01″N 10°04′59″E
- Country: Germany
- State: Schleswig-Holstein
- District: Plön
- Founded: 2008
- Seat: Wankendorf
- Subdivisions: 9 municipalities

Government
  - Mayor: Andreas Lisch

Area
  - Total: 129.32 km^{2} (49.93 sq mi)

Population (2025-12-31)
  - Total: 10,060
  - Density: 77.79/km^{2} (201.5/sq mi)
- Time zone: UTC+01:00 (CET)
  - Summer (DST): UTC+02:00 (CEST)
- Website: www.amt-bokhorst-wankendorf.de

Bokhorst-Wankendorf is an Amt ("collective municipality") in the district of Plön, in Schleswig-Holstein, Germany. Its seat is in Wankendorf. It was formed on 1 January 2008 from the former Ämter Bokhorst and Wankendorf.

The Amt Bokhorst-Wankendorf consists of the following municipalities:

1. Belau
2. Bönebüttel
3. Großharrie
4. Rendswühren
5. Ruhwinkel
6. Schillsdorf
7. Stolpe
8. Tasdorf
9. Wankendorf
