= Bornhöved (Amt) =

Collective municipality in the district of Segeberg, in Schleswig-Holstein, Germany

- Amt
- Map of Segeberg highlighting Bornhöved
- Interactive map of Bornhöved
- Location within Germany Location within Schleswig-Holstein
- Coordinates: 54°03′N 10°13′E
- Country: Germany
- State: Schleswig-Holstein
- District: Segeberg
- Seat: Trappenkamp
- Subdivisions: 8 municipalities

Area
  - Total: 77.9 km^{2} (30.1 sq mi)

Population (2025-12-31)
  - Total: 11,187
  - Density: 144/km^{2} (372/sq mi)
- Time zone: UTC+01:00 (CET)
  - Summer (DST): UTC+02:00 (CEST)
- Website: www.amt-bornhoeved.de

Bornhöved is an Amt ("collective municipality") in the district of Segeberg, in Schleswig-Holstein, Germany. The seat of the Amt is in Trappenkamp.

The Amt Bornhöved consists of the following municipalities:

1. Bornhöved
2. Damsdorf
3. Gönnebek
4. Schmalensee
5. Stocksee
6. Tarbek
7. Tensfeld
8. Trappenkamp
