= Tasdorf =

- Municipality
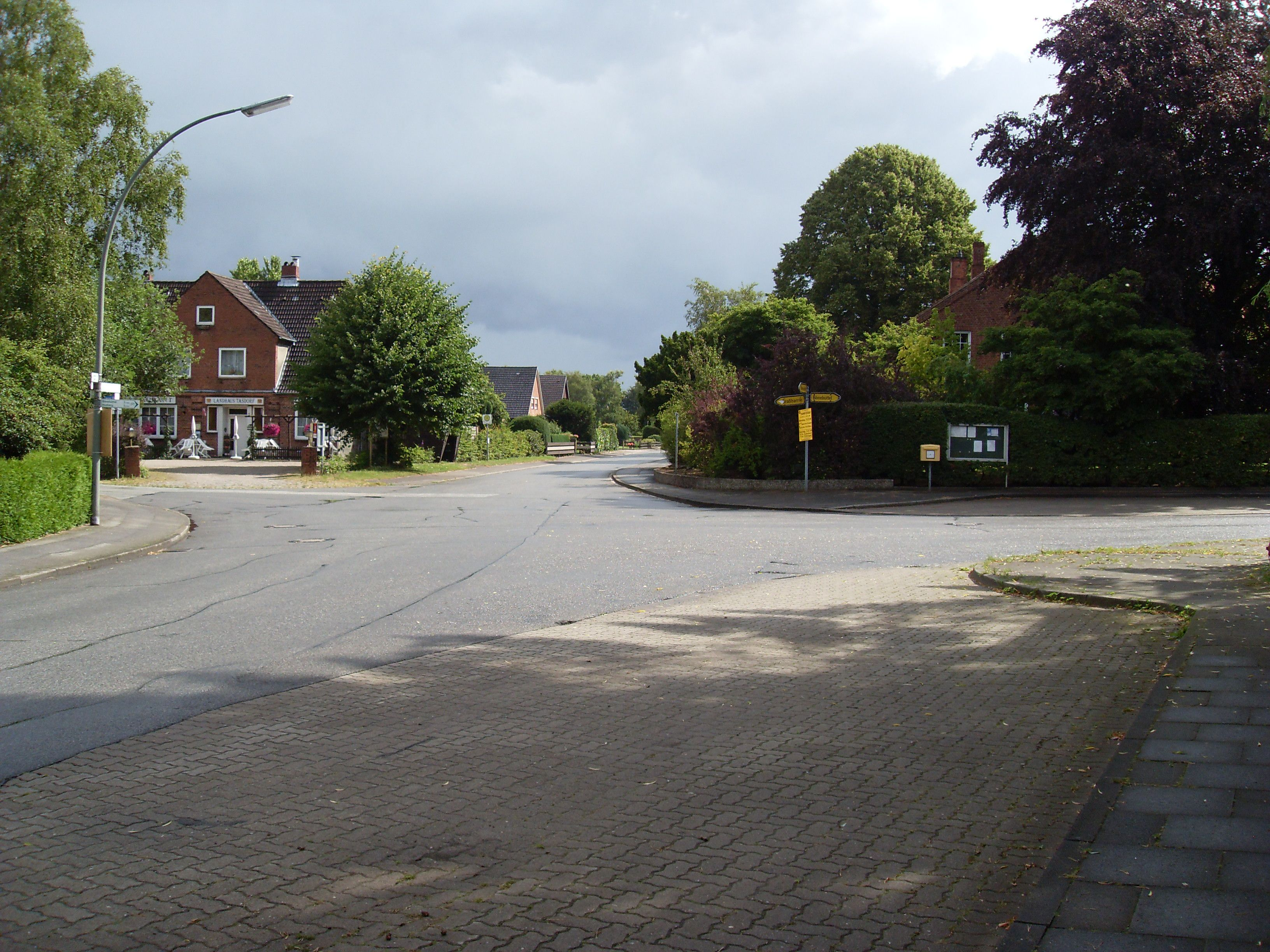

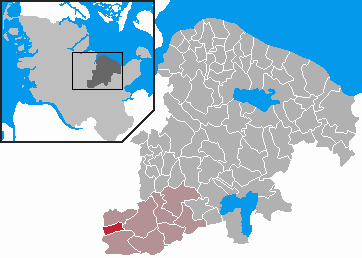
- Location of Tasdorf within Plön district
- Interactive map of Tasdorf
- Location within Germany Location within Schleswig-Holstein
- Coordinates: 54°6′N 10°1′E
- Country: Germany
- State: Schleswig-Holstein
- District: Plön
- Municipal assoc.: Bokhorst-Wankendorf

Government
  - Mayor: Reinhard Wallmann

Area
  - Total: 5.1 km^{2} (2.0 sq mi)
- Elevation: 29 m (95 ft)

Population (2025-12-31)
  - Total: 362
  - Density: 71/km^{2} (180/sq mi)
- Time zone: UTC+01:00 (CET)
  - Summer (DST): UTC+02:00 (CEST)
- Postal codes: 24536
- Dialling codes: 04321
- Vehicle registration: PLÖ
- Website: www.amt-bokhorst- wankendorf.de

Tasdorf is a municipality in the district of Plön, in Schleswig-Holstein, Germany. Tasdorf was first mentioned in documents dating to the year 1141 AD. The current population is about 360 people; the size of the municipal area amounts to roughly 5 km². Tasdorf is located in the northeastern city limits of Neumünster. The closed railroad line from Neumünster to Ascheberg ran to the south of the village. The brook Dosenbek flows from the nature reserve Dosenmoor to Neumünster through the village municipal area.
