= Tarbek =

- Municipality
- Coat of arms

- Location of Tarbek within Segeberg district
- Interactive map of Tarbek
- Location within Germany Location within Schleswig-Holstein
- Coordinates: 54°03′20″N 10°16′00″E
- Country: Germany
- State: Schleswig-Holstein
- District: Segeberg
- Municipal assoc.: Bornhöved

Government
  - Mayor: Jörn Saggau

Area
  - Total: 9.92 km^{2} (3.83 sq mi)
- Elevation: 55 m (180 ft)

Population (2025-12-31)
  - Total: 160
  - Density: 16/km^{2} (42/sq mi)
- Time zone: UTC+01:00 (CET)
  - Summer (DST): UTC+02:00 (CEST)
- Postal codes: 24619
- Dialling codes: 04323
- Vehicle registration: SE
- Website: www.amt- bornhoeved.de

Tarbek is a municipality in the district of Segeberg, in Schleswig-Holstein, Germany. It is part of the Amt Bornhöved.
