= Schmalensee =

- Municipality
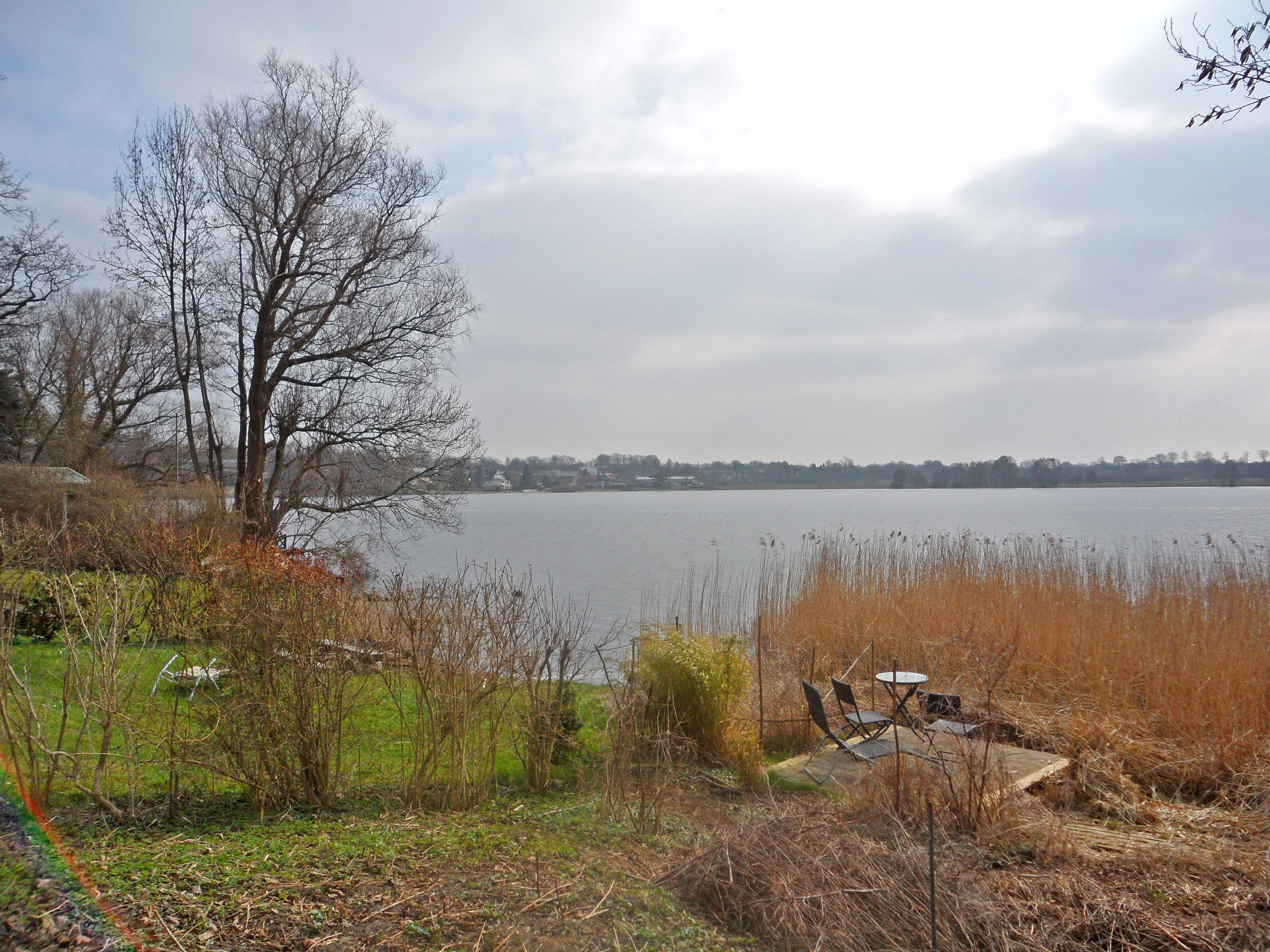
- Lake Schmalensee

- Coat of arms

- Location of Schmalensee within Segeberg district
- Interactive map of Schmalensee
- Location within Germany Location within Schleswig-Holstein
- Coordinates: 54°4′53″N 10°16′17″E
- Country: Germany
- State: Schleswig-Holstein
- District: Segeberg
- Municipal assoc.: Bornhöved

Government
  - Mayor: Sönke Siebke

Area
  - Total: 8.68 km^{2} (3.35 sq mi)
- Elevation: 50 m (160 ft)

Population (2025-12-31)
  - Total: 486
  - Density: 56.0/km^{2} (145/sq mi)
- Time zone: UTC+01:00 (CET)
  - Summer (DST): UTC+02:00 (CEST)
- Postal codes: 24638
- Dialling codes: 04323
- Vehicle registration: SE
- Website: http://www.gemeinde-schmalensee.de/

Schmalensee is a municipality in the district of Segeberg, in Schleswig-Holstein, Germany. It is located on the shores of the eponymous lake.
