= Belauer See =

Lake in Plön District, Schleswig-Holstein, Germany

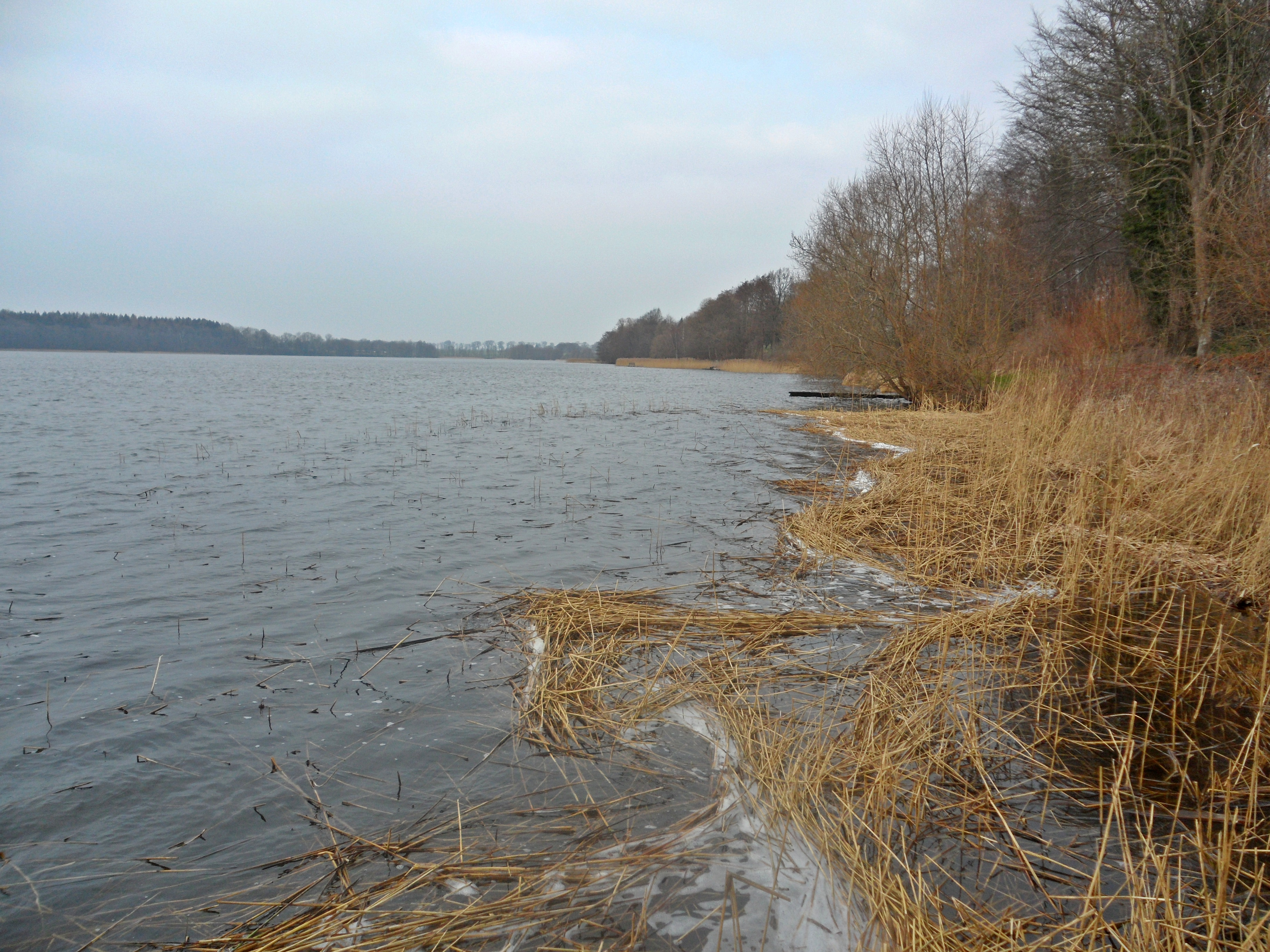
- Lake Belau at the bathing site in Belau

- Location within Schleswig-Holstein
- Location: Kreis Plön, Schleswig-Holstein
- Coordinates: 54°6′2″N 10°15′11″E
- Primary inflows: Alte Schwentine
- Primary outflows: Alte Schwentine
- Basin countries: Germany
- Max. length: 2.35 km (1.46 mi)
- Max. width: 0.8 km (0.50 mi)
- Surface area: 1.13 km^{2} (0.44 sq mi)
- Average depth: 9 m (30 ft)
- Max. depth: 25.6 m (84 ft)
- Water volume: 10,180,000 m^{3} (360,000,000 cu ft)
- Shore length^{1}: 5.65 km (3.51 mi)
- ^{1} Shore length is not a well-defined measure.

Belauer See is a lake in Kreis Plön, Schleswig-Holstein, Germany. At an elevation of 42 m above sea level, its surface area is 1.13 km².
