= Bönebüttel =

- Municipality
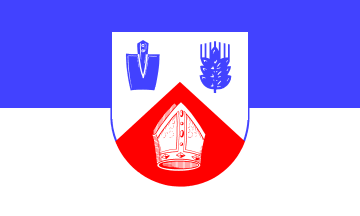
- Flag Coat of arms

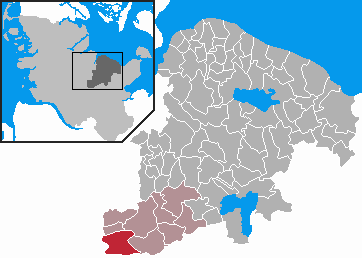
- Location of Bönebüttel within Plön district
- Interactive map of Bönebüttel
- Location within Germany Location within Schleswig-Holstein
- Coordinates: 54°4′N 10°4′E
- Country: Germany
- State: Schleswig-Holstein
- District: Plön
- Municipal assoc.: Bokhorst-Wankendorf

Government
  - Mayor: Udo Runow

Area
  - Total: 20.4 km^{2} (7.9 sq mi)
- Elevation: 29 m (95 ft)

Population (2025-12-31)
  - Total: 2,083
  - Density: 102/km^{2} (264/sq mi)
- Time zone: UTC+01:00 (CET)
  - Summer (DST): UTC+02:00 (CEST)
- Postal codes: 24620
- Dialling codes: 04394 und 04321
- Vehicle registration: PLÖ
- Website: www.amt-bokhorst- wankendorf.de

Bönebüttel is a municipality in the district of Plön, in Schleswig-Holstein, Germany.
