= Großharrie =

- Municipality
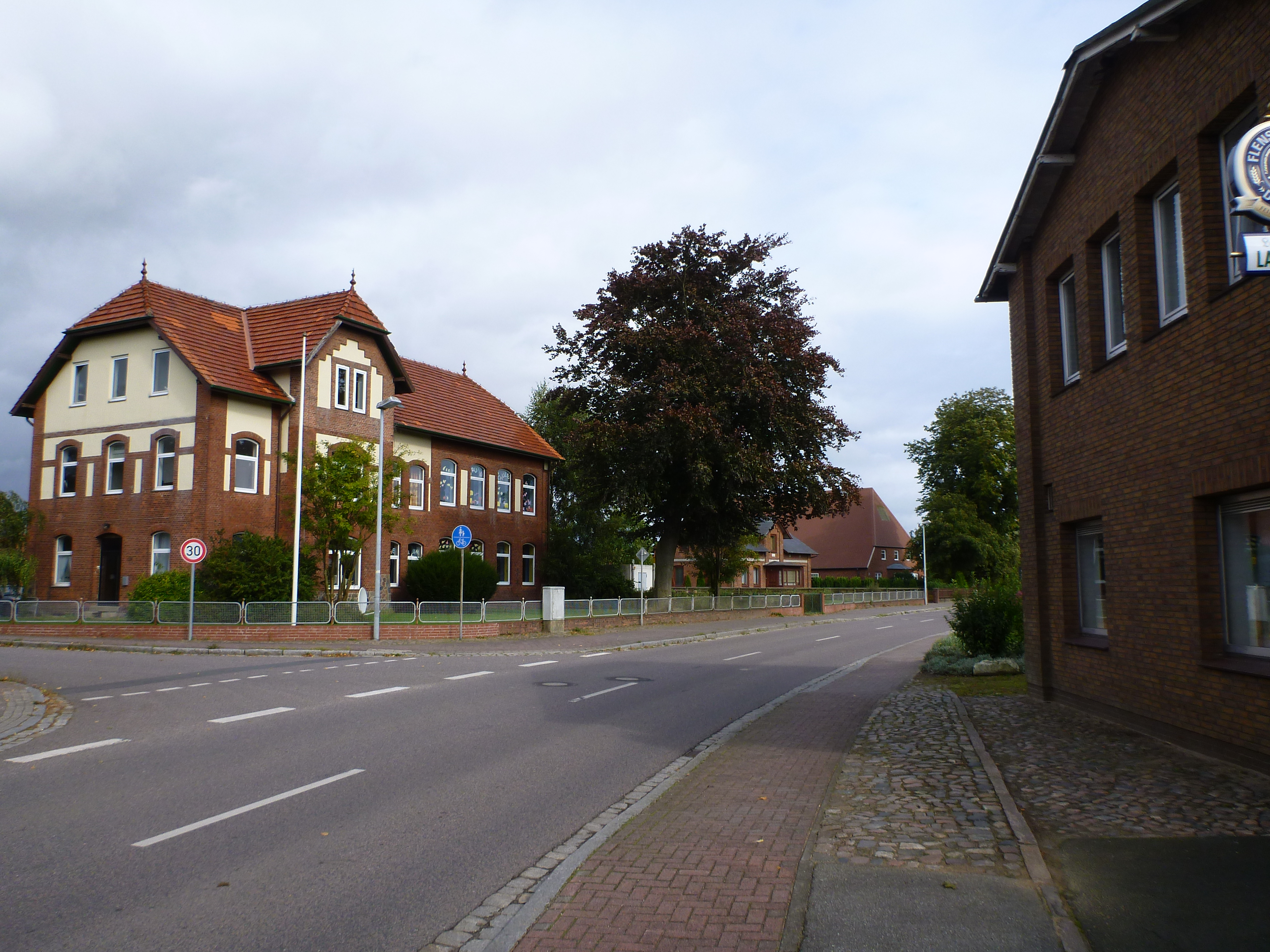

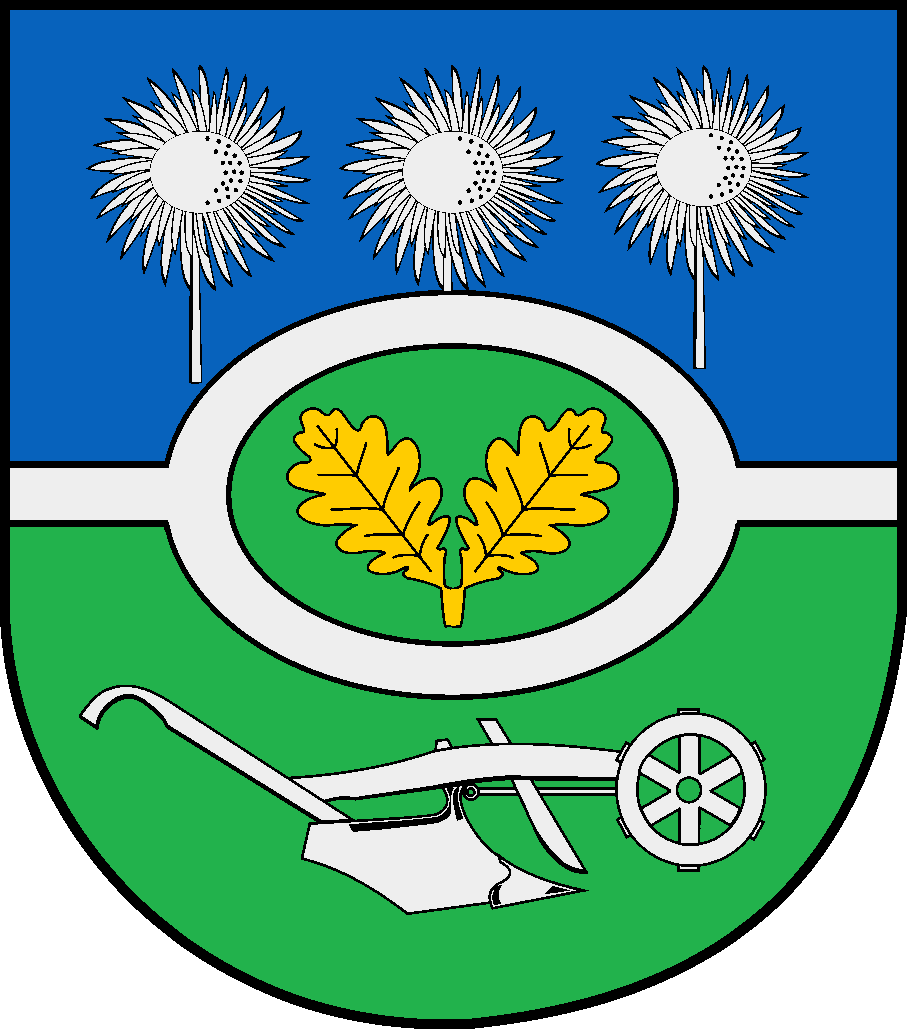
- Coat of arms

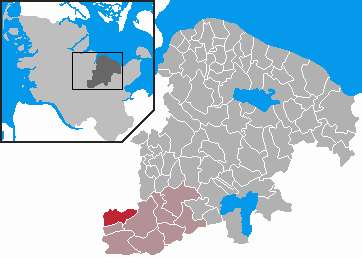
- Location of Großharrie within Plön district
- Interactive map of Großharrie
- Location within Germany Location within Schleswig-Holstein
- Coordinates: 54°7′N 10°3′E
- Country: Germany
- State: Schleswig-Holstein
- District: Plön
- Municipal assoc.: Bokhorst-Wankendorf

Government
  - Mayor: Detlef Sötje

Area
  - Total: 13.17 km^{2} (5.08 sq mi)
- Elevation: 31 m (102 ft)

Population (2025-12-31)
  - Total: 505
  - Density: 38.3/km^{2} (99.3/sq mi)
- Time zone: UTC+01:00 (CET)
  - Summer (DST): UTC+02:00 (CEST)
- Postal codes: 24625
- Dialling codes: 04394
- Vehicle registration: PLÖ
- Website: www.amt-bokhorst- wankendorf.de

Großharrie is a municipality in the district of Plön, in Schleswig-Holstein, Germany. The village is located about 10 kilometers north east of Neumünster close to the Dosenmoor.
