= Schillsdorf =

- Municipality
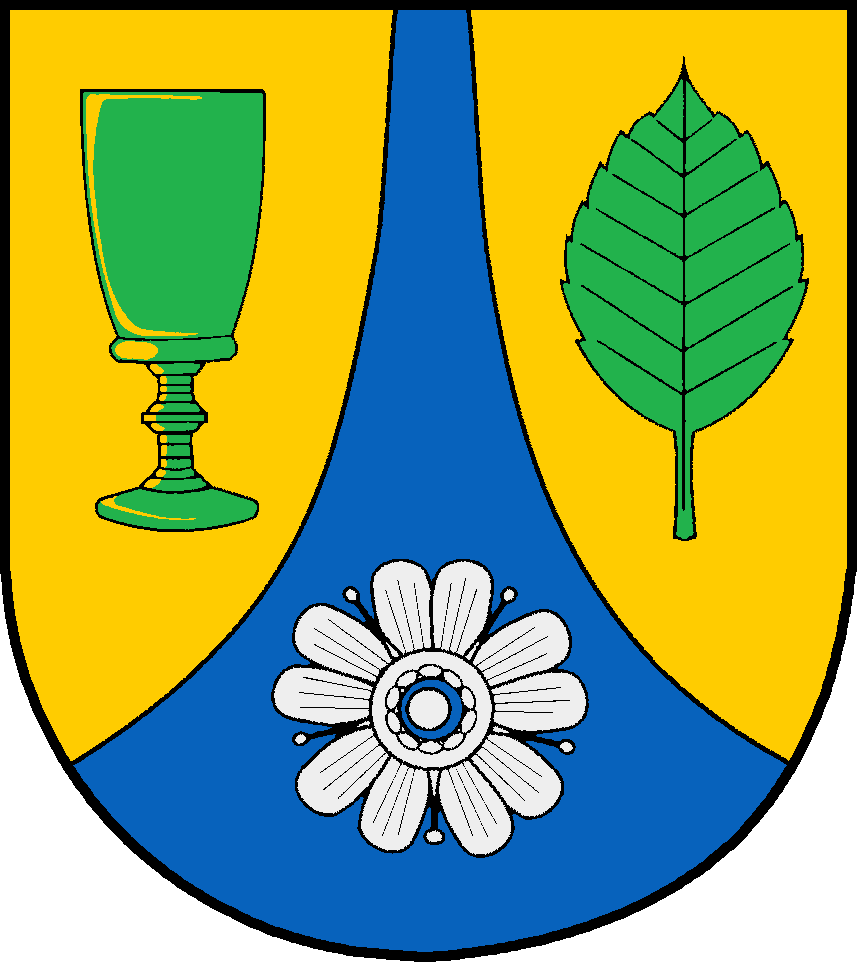
- Coat of arms

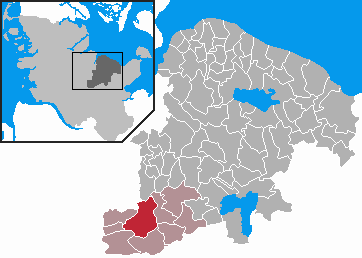
- Location of Schillsdorf within Plön district
- Interactive map of Schillsdorf
- Location within Germany Location within Schleswig-Holstein
- Coordinates: 54°7′1″N 10°8′0″E
- Country: Germany
- State: Schleswig-Holstein
- District: Plön
- Municipal assoc.: Bokhorst-Wankendorf

Government
  - Mayor: Karl Fock

Area
  - Total: 26.49 km^{2} (10.23 sq mi)
- Elevation: 42 m (138 ft)

Population (2025-12-31)
  - Total: 853
  - Density: 32.2/km^{2} (83.4/sq mi)
- Time zone: UTC+01:00 (CET)
  - Summer (DST): UTC+02:00 (CEST)
- Postal codes: 24637
- Dialling codes: 04394
- Vehicle registration: PLÖ
- Website: www.amt-bokhorst- wankendorf.de

Schillsdorf is a municipality in the district of Plön, in Schleswig-Holstein, Germany.

Schillsdorf is located about 10 km east of Neumünster, and about 5 km west of the Bundesautobahn 21 (extension to the federal highway 404) from Kiel to Bad Segeberg on the former railway line from Neumünster to Plon.
