= Dosenbek =

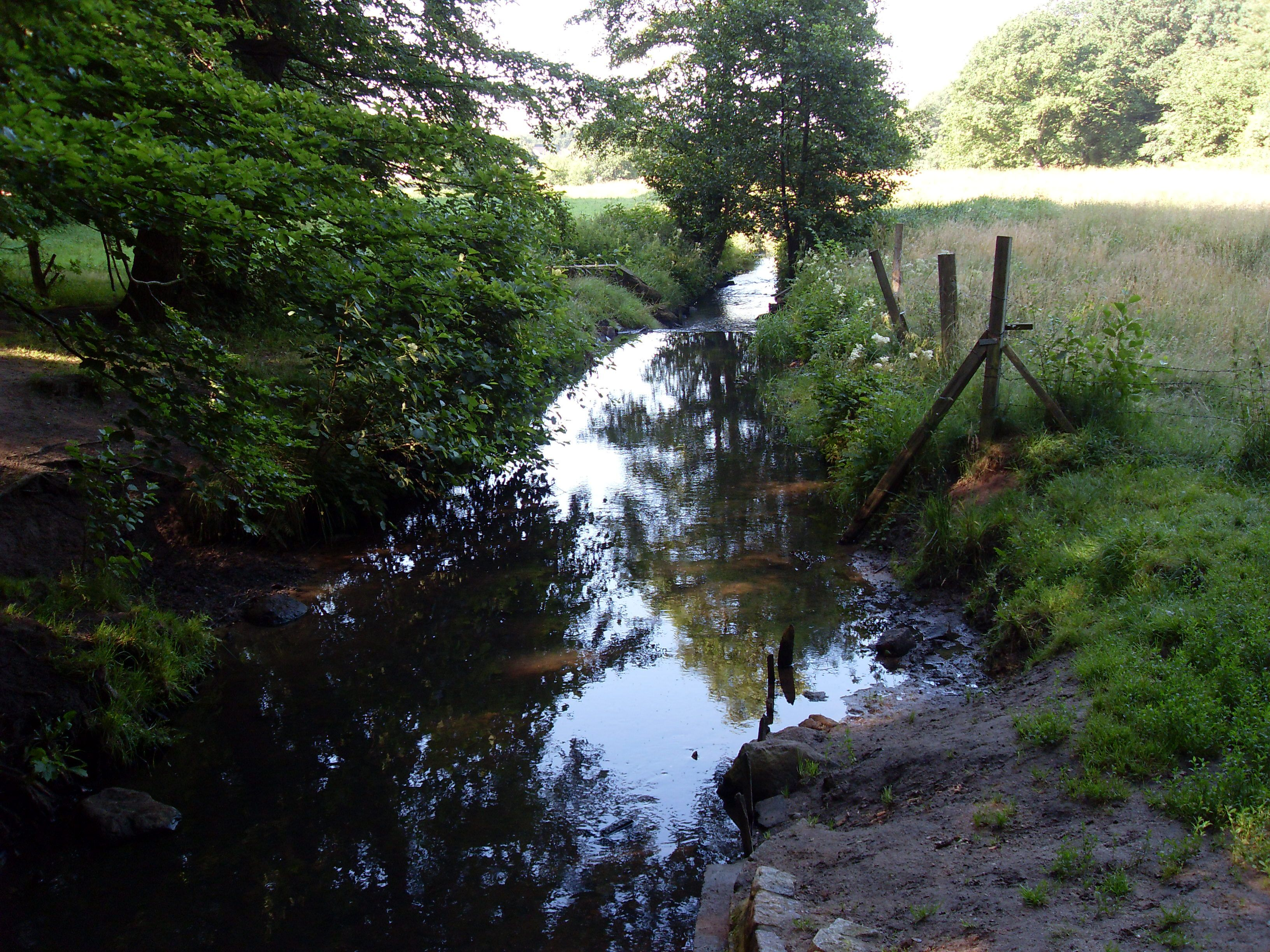
- The Dosenbek close to the mouth in Neumünster

Location
- Country: Germany
- State: Schleswig-Holstein

Physical characteristics
- Source
  - location: Near Negenharrie
- Mouth
  - location: Into the Schwale in Neumünster
  - coordinates: 54.0799°N 10.0104°E
- Length: 8 km (5.0 mi)

Basin features
- Progression: Schwale→ Stör→ Elbe→ North Sea

Dosenbek is an 8-kilometre-long (5.0 mi) river of Schleswig-Holstein, Germany.

The origin is in the Gehege Negenharrie (Gehege may be translated as forest enclosure) in the district Rendsburg-Eckernförde. Most of the water originates from the Dosenmoor. The mouth is close to the Brachenfelder Gehölz in the district Brachenfeld of Neumünster. Here the Dosenbek empties into the Schwale.

== See also ==
- List of rivers of Schleswig-Holstein
