= Bornhöved =

- Municipality
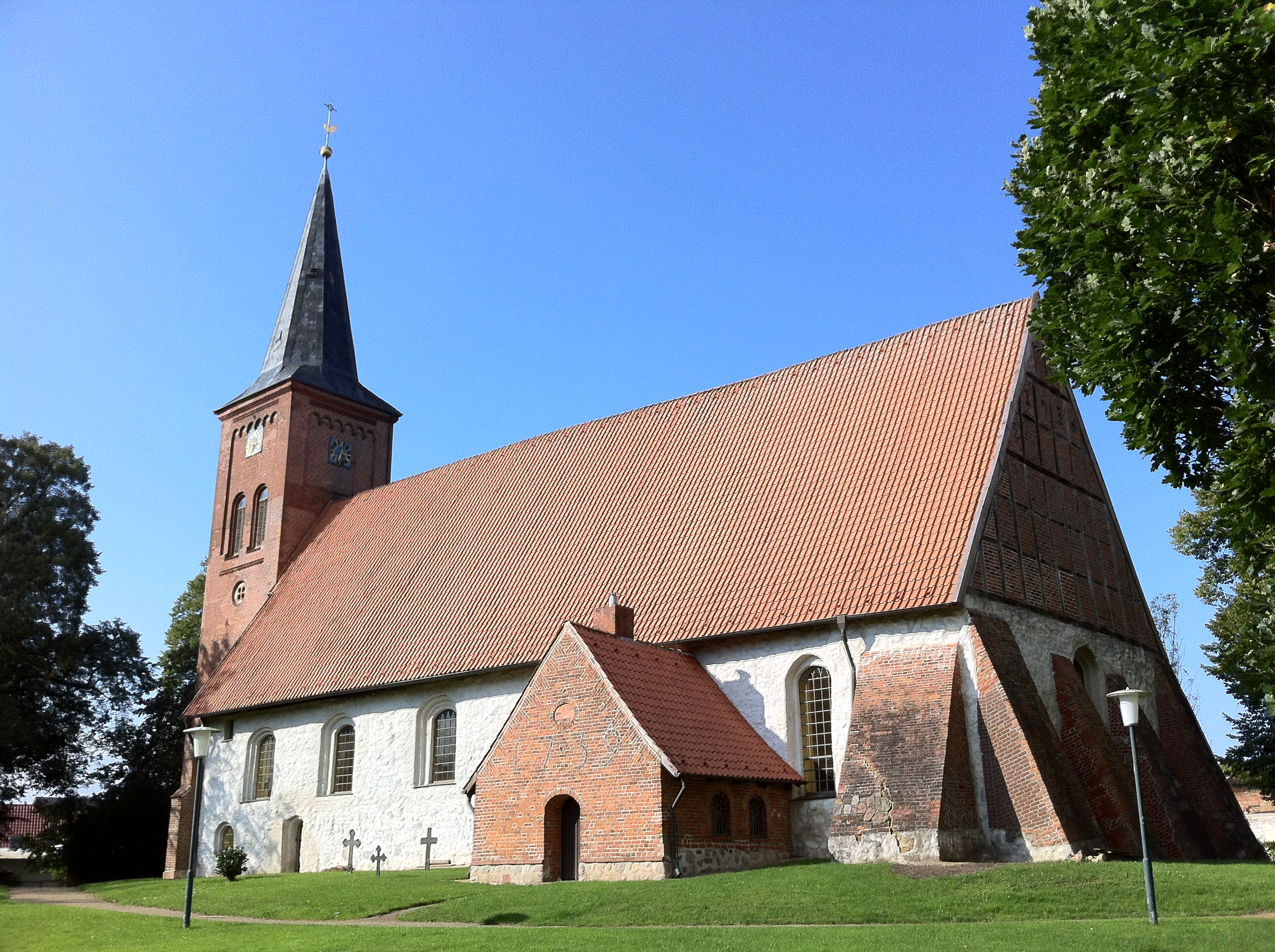
- Lutheran church

- Coat of arms

- Location of Bornhöved within Segeberg district
- Interactive map of Bornhöved
- Location within Germany Location within Schleswig-Holstein
- Coordinates: 54°4′N 10°12′E
- Country: Germany
- State: Schleswig-Holstein
- District: Segeberg
- Municipal assoc.: Bornhöved

Government
  - Mayor: Reinhard Wundram

Area
  - Total: 14.35 km^{2} (5.54 sq mi)
- Elevation: 43 m (141 ft)

Population (2025-12-31)
  - Total: 3,432
  - Density: 239.2/km^{2} (619.4/sq mi)
- Time zone: UTC+01:00 (CET)
  - Summer (DST): UTC+02:00 (CEST)
- Postal codes: 24619
- Dialling codes: 04323
- Vehicle registration: SE
- Website: https://www.bornhoeved.de/

Bornhöved (German pronunciation: [bɔʁnˈhøːvət]) is a municipality in the Kreis (district) of Segeberg in Schleswig-Holstein, north Germany. It is situated some 16 km east of Neumünster.

Bornhöved is part of the Amt (municipal confederation) of Bornhöved.
