= Trappenkamp =

- Municipality
- Flag Coat of arms

- Location of Trappenkamp within Segeberg district
- Interactive map of Trappenkamp
- Location within Germany Location within Schleswig-Holstein
- Coordinates: 54°3′N 10°13′E
- Country: Germany
- State: Schleswig-Holstein
- District: Segeberg
- Municipal assoc.: Bornhöved

Government
  - Mayor: Harald Krille

Area
  - Total: 3.32 km^{2} (1.28 sq mi)
- Elevation: 45 m (148 ft)

Population (2025-12-31)
  - Total: 5,171
  - Density: 1,560/km^{2} (4,030/sq mi)
- Time zone: UTC+01:00 (CET)
  - Summer (DST): UTC+02:00 (CEST)
- Postal codes: 24610
- Dialling codes: 04323
- Vehicle registration: SE
- Website: www.amt- bornhoeved.de

Trappenkamp is a municipality in the district of Segeberg, in Schleswig-Holstein, Germany. It is situated approximately 15 km east of Neumünster. It has about 5500 inhabitants.

On the site of the municipality used to be a former Prussian parade ground for cavalry and infantry, the "Gönnebeker Heide". In 1901, it started to be cultivated and reforestated until the 1920s.

In July 1934, the naval command in Berlin ordered the construction of a new minefield near Kiel. This mine storage facility was intended to relieve the pressure on the barrage depot in Kiel-Dietrichsdorf. The former Neumünster state forest was chosen as the location for the new arsenal. The Halloh forest to the south of Boostedt was not chosen as the terrain available at the time was not suitable: the trees in this area were too sparse, the ground too uneven and it was a popular destination for excursions for the people of Neumünster. In 1940, however, the air munitions station 6/XI Boostedt was set up at another location in Halloh Forest.

The arsenal was occupied by British troops on May 18, 1945. After its evacuation, it was used as a refugee camp for displaced Germans from the Ostgebiete as well as from Sudetenland.

Until April 1956, Trappenkamp was part of the Bornhöved municipality, before being declared an independent municipality.
