= Rendswühren =

- Municipality
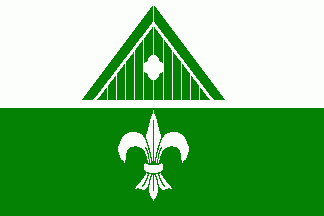
- Flag Coat of arms

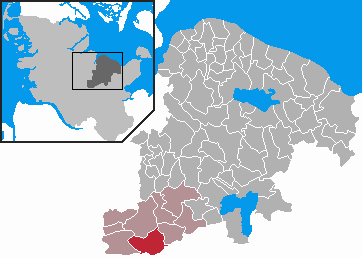
- Location of Rendswühren within Plön district
- Interactive map of Rendswühren
- Location within Germany Location within Schleswig-Holstein
- Coordinates: 54°4′N 10°10′E
- Country: Germany
- State: Schleswig-Holstein
- District: Plön
- Municipal assoc.: Bokhorst-Wankendorf

Government
  - Mayor: Claus Hopp

Area
  - Total: 19.75 km^{2} (7.63 sq mi)
- Elevation: 43 m (141 ft)

Population (2025-12-31)
  - Total: 725
  - Density: 36.7/km^{2} (95.1/sq mi)
- Time zone: UTC+01:00 (CET)
  - Summer (DST): UTC+02:00 (CEST)
- Postal codes: 24619
- Dialling codes: 04323, 04394
- Vehicle registration: PLÖ
- Website: www.amt-bokhorst- wankendorf.de

Rendswühren is a municipality in the district of Plön, in Schleswig-Holstein, Germany.
