= Belau, Schleswig-Holstein =

- Municipality
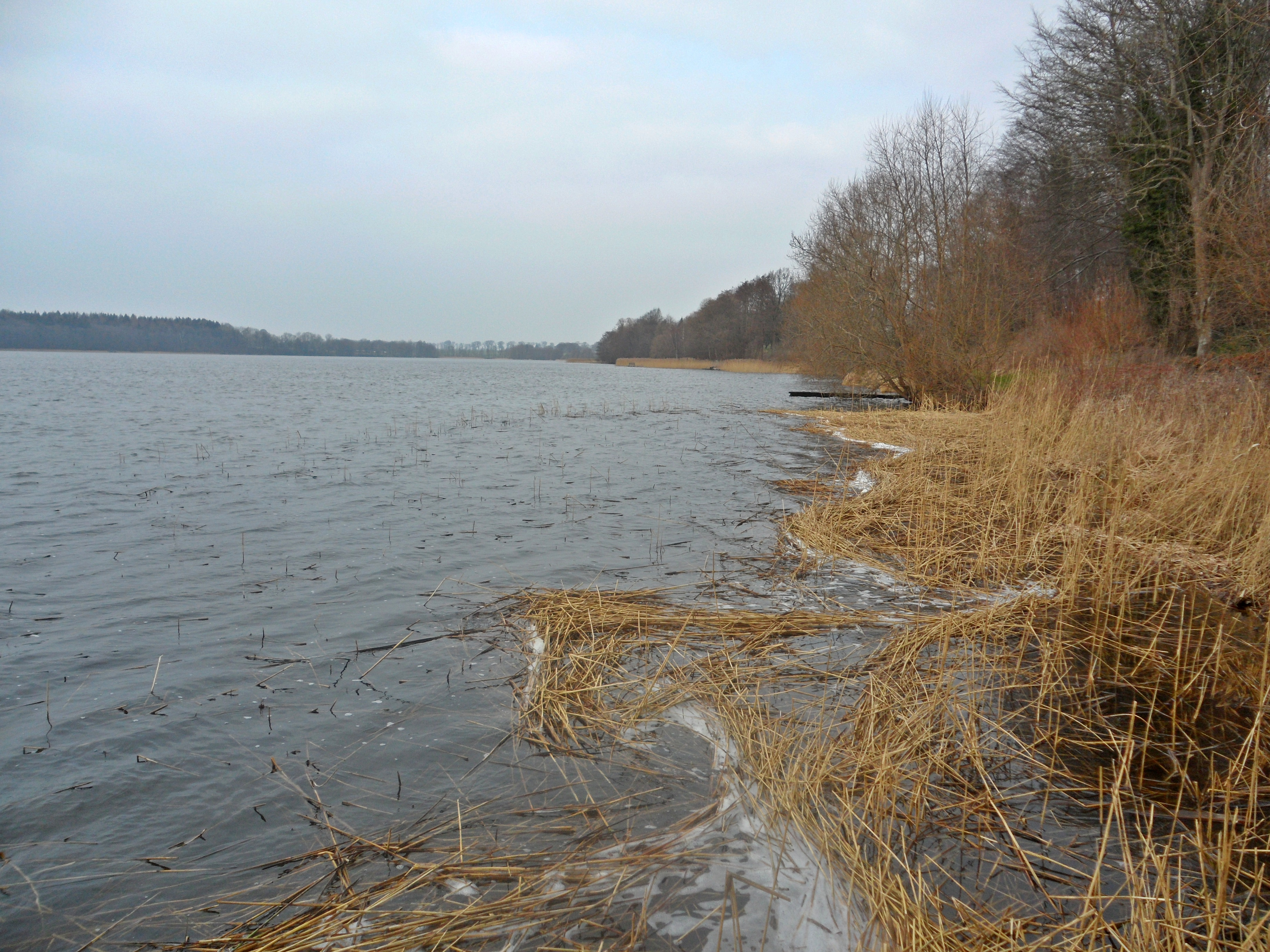
- Belauer See in Belau

- Coat of arms

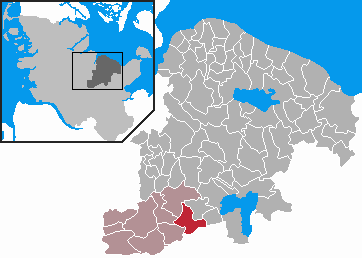
- Location of Belau, Schleswig-Holstein within Plön district
- Interactive map of Belau, Schleswig-Holstein
- Location within Germany Location within Schleswig-Holstein
- Coordinates: 54°6′N 10°16′E
- Country: Germany
- State: Schleswig-Holstein
- District: Plön
- Municipal assoc.: Bokhorst-Wankendorf

Government
  - Mayor: Jörg Engelmann

Area
  - Total: 14.89 km^{2} (5.75 sq mi)
- Elevation: 42 m (138 ft)

Population (2025-12-31)
  - Total: 373
  - Density: 25.1/km^{2} (64.9/sq mi)
- Time zone: UTC+01:00 (CET)
  - Summer (DST): UTC+02:00 (CEST)
- Postal codes: 24601
- Dialling codes: 04323
- Vehicle registration: PLÖ
- Website: www.amt-bokhorst- wankendorf.de

Belau (German pronunciation: [ˈbeːlaʊ]) is a municipality in the district of Plön, in Schleswig-Holstein, Germany.
