= Ruhwinkel =

- Municipality
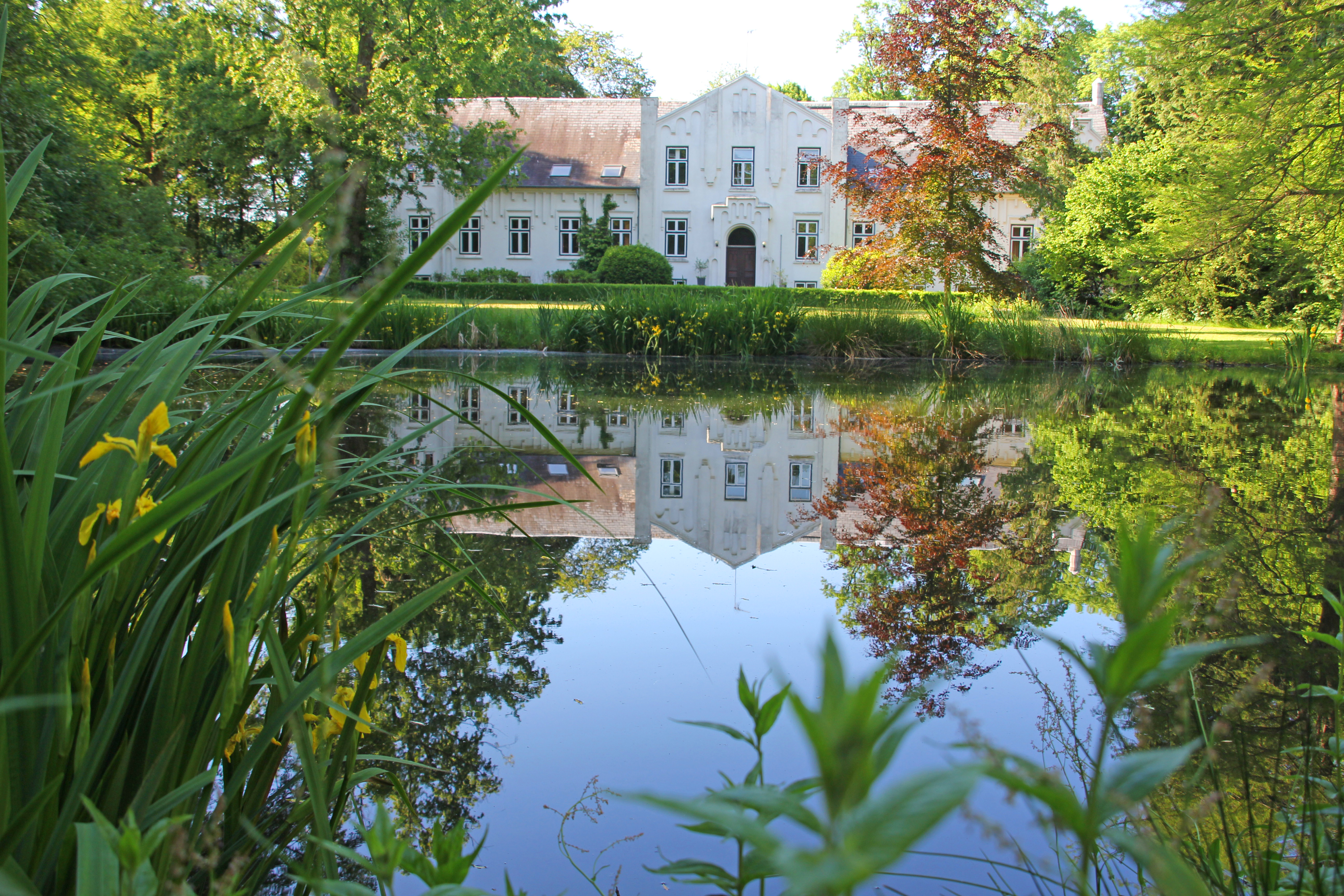
- Schönböken Manor in Ruhwinkel

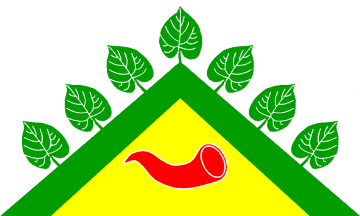
- Flag Coat of arms

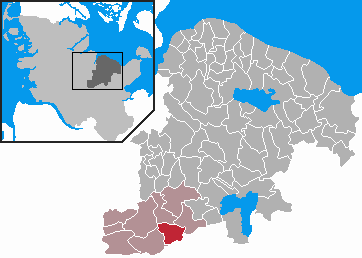
- Location of Ruhwinkel within Plön district
- Interactive map of Ruhwinkel
- Location within Germany Location within Schleswig-Holstein
- Coordinates: 54°5′40″N 10°13′17″E
- Country: Germany
- State: Schleswig-Holstein
- District: Plön
- Municipal assoc.: Bokhorst-Wankendorf

Government
  - Mayor: Antje Bublitz

Area
  - Total: 13.13 km^{2} (5.07 sq mi)
- Elevation: 39 m (128 ft)

Population (2025-12-31)
  - Total: 942
  - Density: 71.7/km^{2} (186/sq mi)
- Time zone: UTC+01:00 (CET)
  - Summer (DST): UTC+02:00 (CEST)
- Postal codes: 24601
- Dialling codes: 04323, 04326
- Vehicle registration: PLÖ
- Website: www.amt-bokhorst- wankendorf.de

Ruhwinkel is a municipality in the district of Plön, in Schleswig-Holstein, Germany.
