= Wankendorf =

- Municipality
- Flag Coat of arms

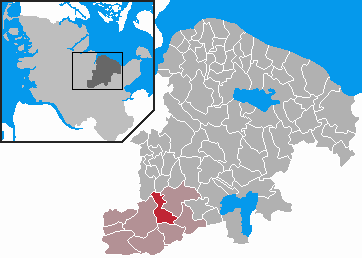
- Location of Wankendorf within Plön district
- Interactive map of Wankendorf
- Location within Germany Location within Schleswig-Holstein
- Coordinates: 54°7′1″N 10°12′30″E
- Country: Germany
- State: Schleswig-Holstein
- District: Plön
- Municipal assoc.: Bokhorst-Wankendorf

Government
  - Mayor: Rüdiger Pries

Area
  - Total: 13.34 km^{2} (5.15 sq mi)
- Elevation: 42 m (138 ft)

Population (2025-12-31)
  - Total: 2,915
  - Density: 218.5/km^{2} (566.0/sq mi)
- Time zone: UTC+01:00 (CET)
  - Summer (DST): UTC+02:00 (CEST)
- Postal codes: 24601
- Dialling codes: 04326
- Vehicle registration: PLÖ
- Website: www.amt-wankendorf.de

Wankendorf is a municipality in the district of Plön, in Schleswig-Holstein, Germany. It is situated approximately 24 km south of Kiel.

Wankendorf is the seat of the Amt ("collective municipality") Bokhorst-Wankendorf.

== Literature ==
- Volker Griese & Heinrich Griese: Wankendorf im Wandel der Zeit - Eine Chronik. Norderstedt: Books on Demand, 2009, 488 p., ISBN 3748130082
