= Stolpe, Schleswig-Holstein =

Stolpe
- Municipality
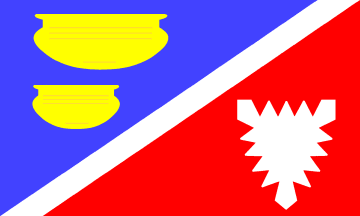
- Flag Coat of arms

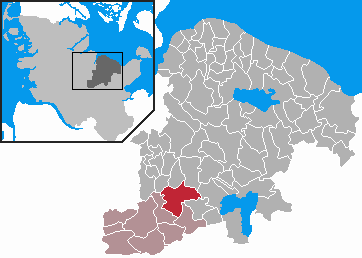
- Location of Stolpe within Plön district
- Interactive map of Stolpe
- Location within Germany Location within Schleswig-Holstein
- Coordinates: 54°7′N 10°13′E
- Country: Germany
- State: Schleswig-Holstein
- District: Plön
- Municipal assoc.: Bokhorst-Wankendorf

Government
  - Mayor: Holger Bajorat

Area
  - Total: 23.21 km^{2} (8.96 sq mi)
- Elevation: 28 m (92 ft)

Population (2025-12-31)
  - Total: 1,302
  - Density: 56.10/km^{2} (145.3/sq mi)
- Time zone: UTC+01:00 (CET)
  - Summer (DST): UTC+02:00 (CEST)
- Postal codes: 24601
- Dialling codes: 04326
- Vehicle registration: PLÖ
- Website: www.stolpe.de

Stolpe (German pronunciation: [ˈʃtɔlpə]) is a municipality in the district of Plön, in Schleswig-Holstein, Germany.
