= List of waterbodies in Schleswig-Holstein =

Waterbodies in Schleswig-Holstein

== Lakes, ponds and reservoirs ==
=== A ===
- Achtersee

=== B ===
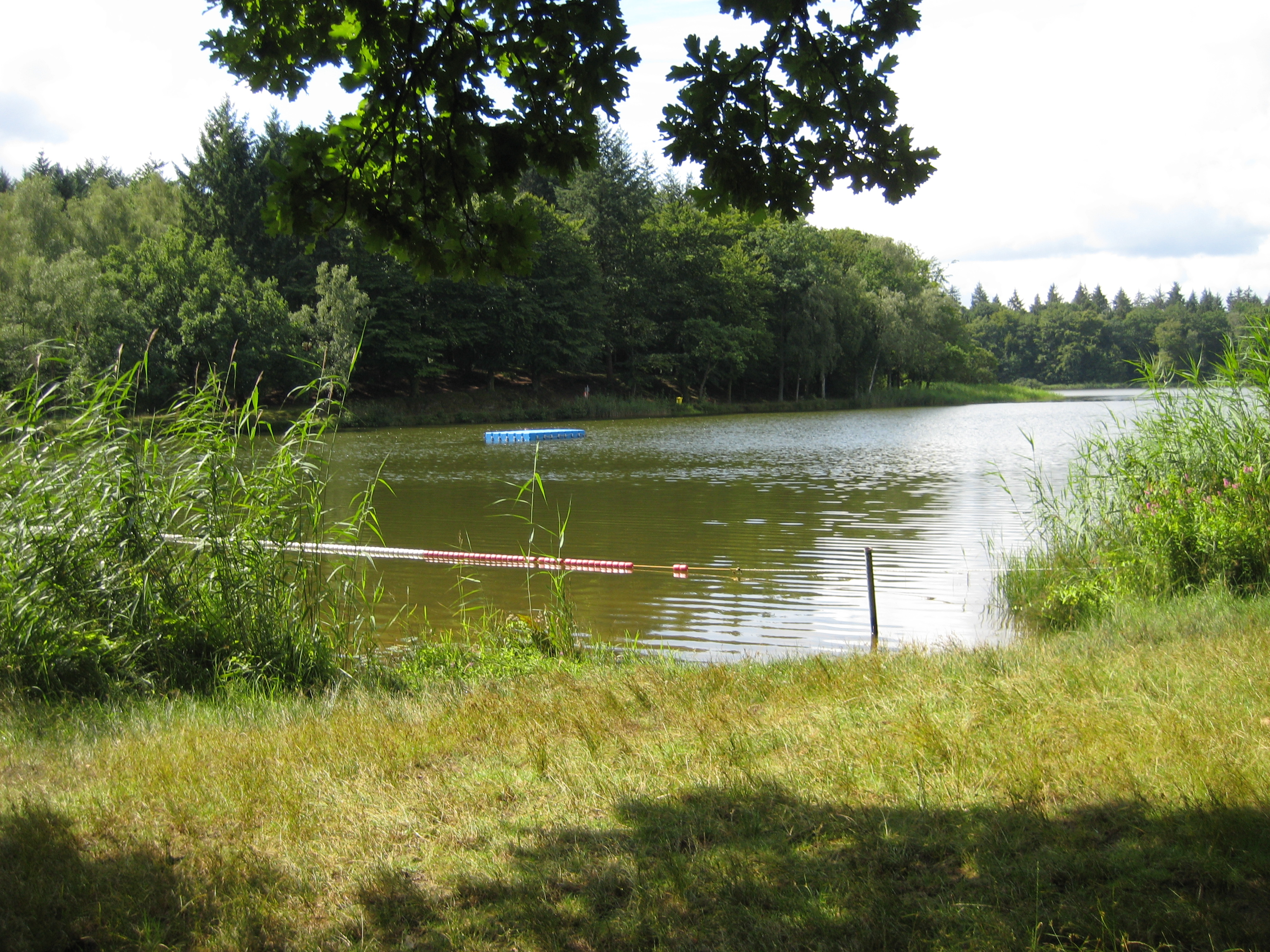
Bredenbeker Teich

- Barkauer See
- Behlendorfer See
- Behler See
- Belauer See
- Benzer Seen
- Bistensee
- Borgdorfer See
- Blankensee (Lübeck)
- Bornhöveder See
- Bornhöveder Seenkette
- Bothkamper See
- Brahmsee
- Brautsee
- Bültsee

=== D ===
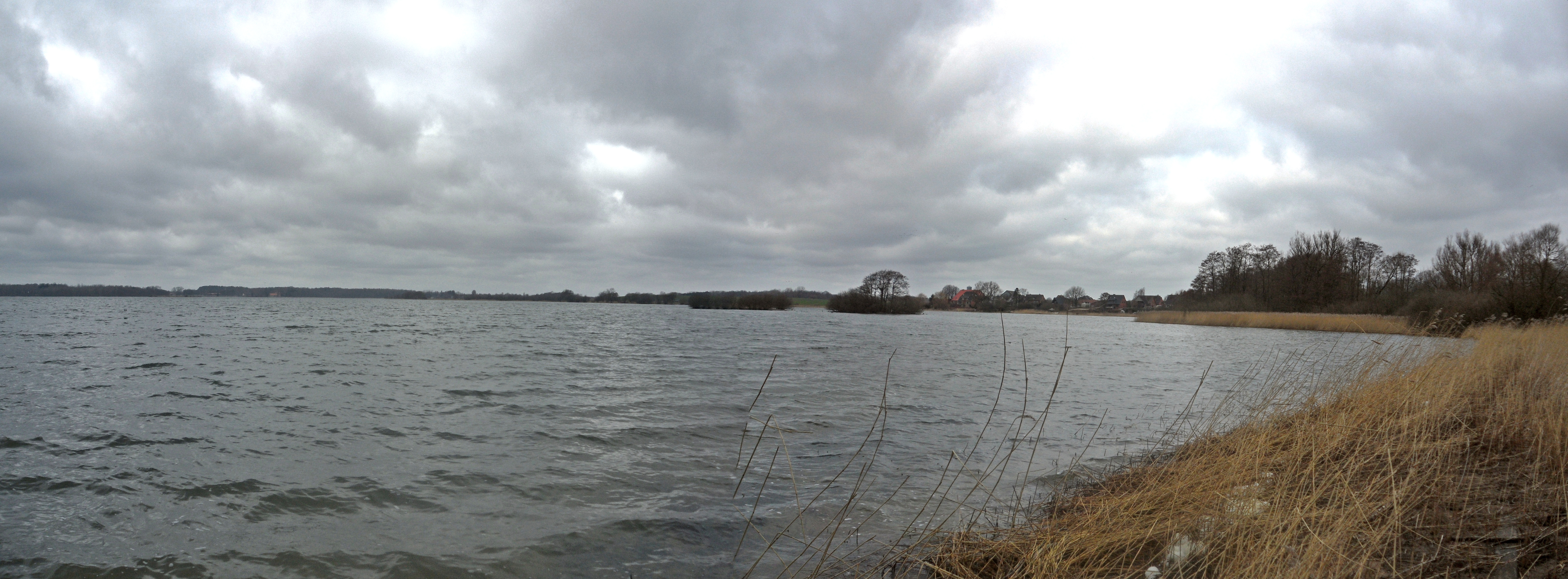
Dobersdorfer See

- Dassower See
- Dieksee
- Dobersdorfer See
- Drüsensee

=== E ===
- Einfelder See
- Großer Eutiner See
- Kleiner Eutiner See

=== F ===
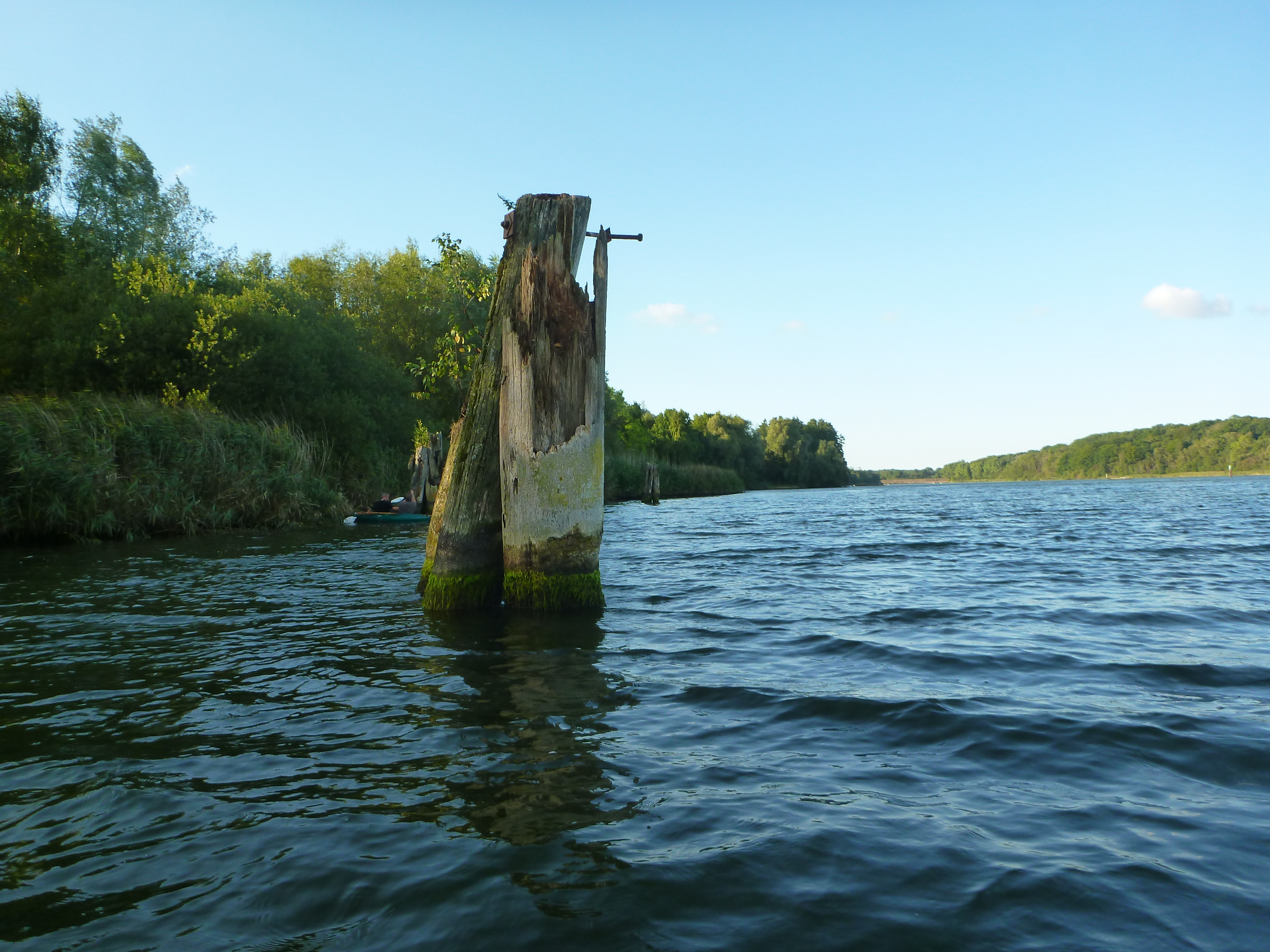
Flemhuder See

- Flemhuder See
- Fresensee
- Fuhlensee

=== G ===
- Garrensee
- Glinder Mühlenteich
- Goossee
- Grabauer See
- Großer Binnensee
- Großensee
- Gudower See

=== H ===
- Haddebyer Noor
- Hegesee
- Hemmelsdorfer See
- Höftsee

=== I ===
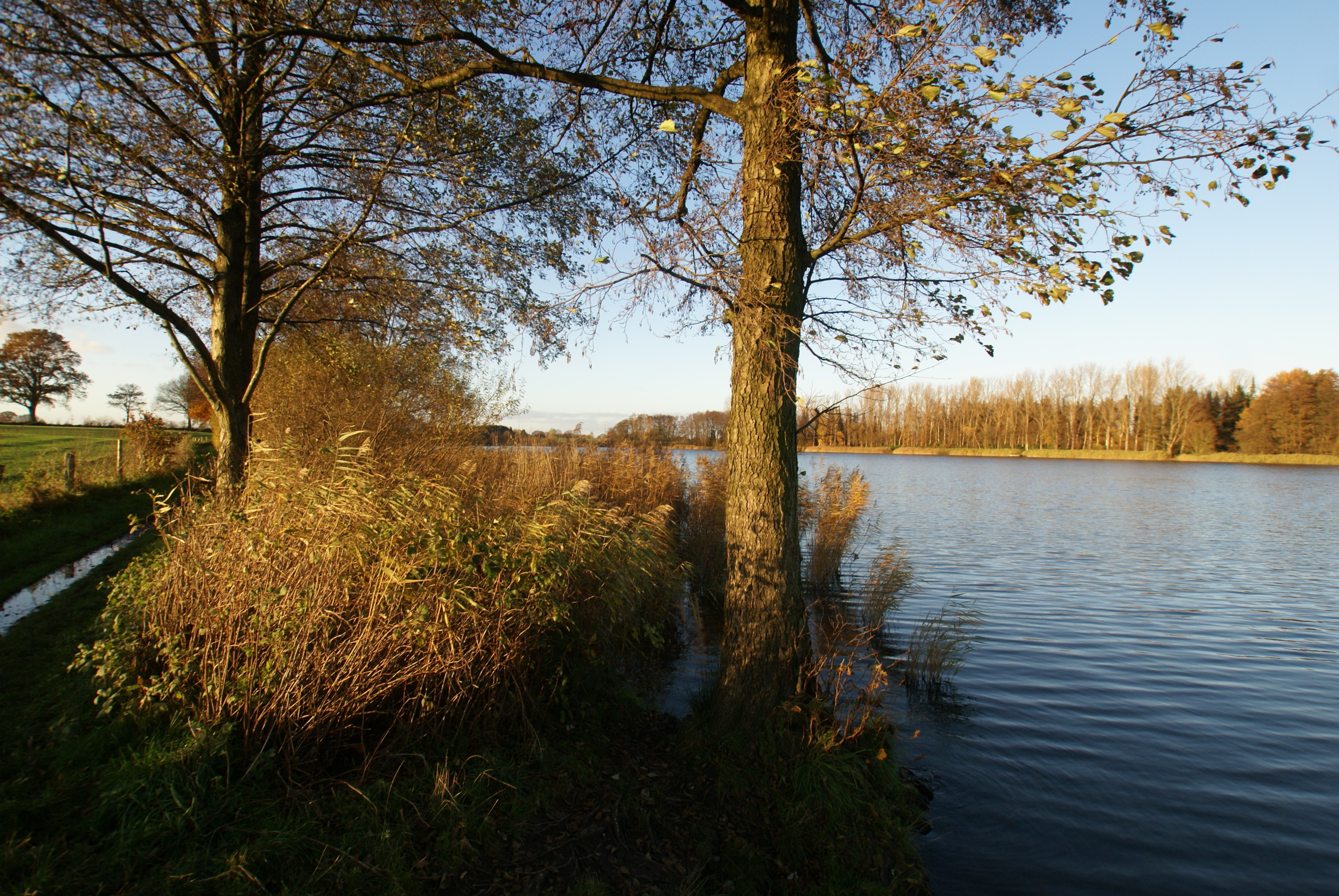
Itzstedter See

- Itzstedter See

=== K ===
- Kellersee
- Kieler Bootshafen
- Kirchsee
- Kleiner Kiel
- Klenzauer See
- Kohlborn
- Krebssee (Mölln)
- Kronsee
- Krebssee
- Krummsee (Kreis Ostholstein)
- Kudensee
- Kührener Teich

=== L ===
- Langensee
- Langsee
- Lanker See
- Lanzer See
- Lüttauer See
- Lottsee

=== M ===
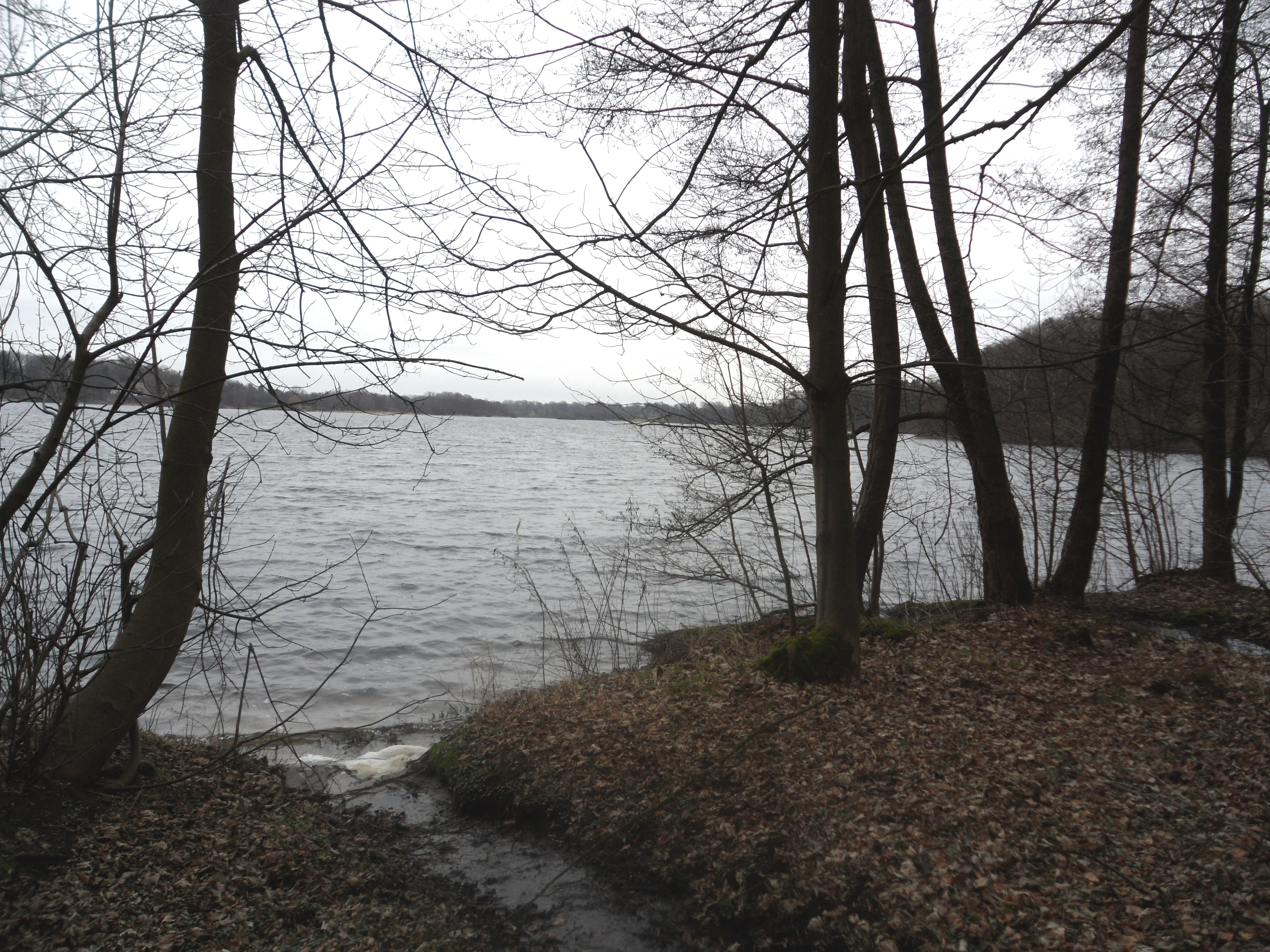
Mözener See

- Mechower See
- Middelburger See
- Middelburg Lakes
- Molfsee (lake)
- Möllner Seenplatte
- Mözener See
- Mühlenteich (Lübeck)
- Mühlenteich (Reinbek)

=== N ===
- Neukirchener See
- Neversdorfer See

=== Ö ===
- Överdiek

=== P ===
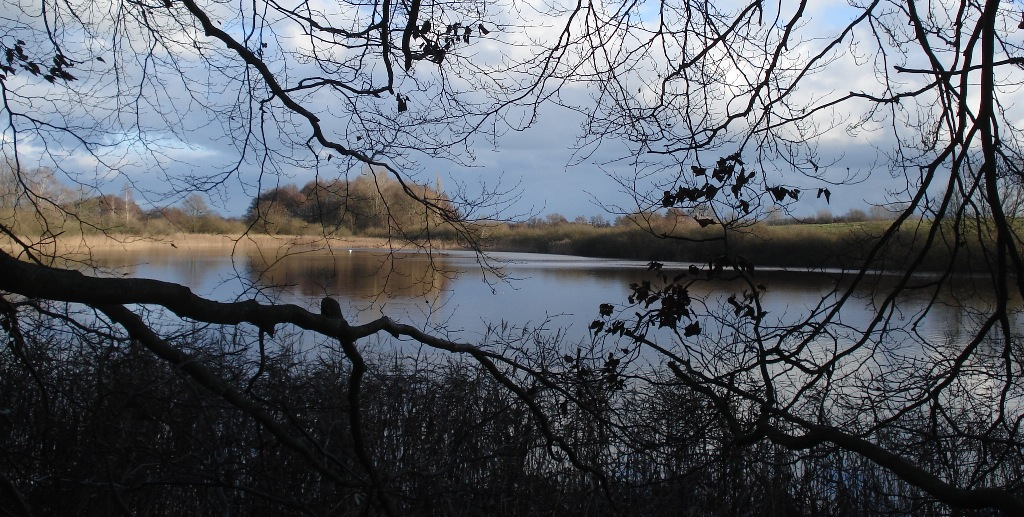
Peper See

- Passader See
- Peper See
- Pipersee
- Großer Plöner See
- Kleiner Plöner See
- Plußsee
- Pohlsee
- Pohnsdorfer Stauung
- Großer Pönitzer See
- Kleiner Pönitzer See
- Postsee
- Pinnsee

=== R ===
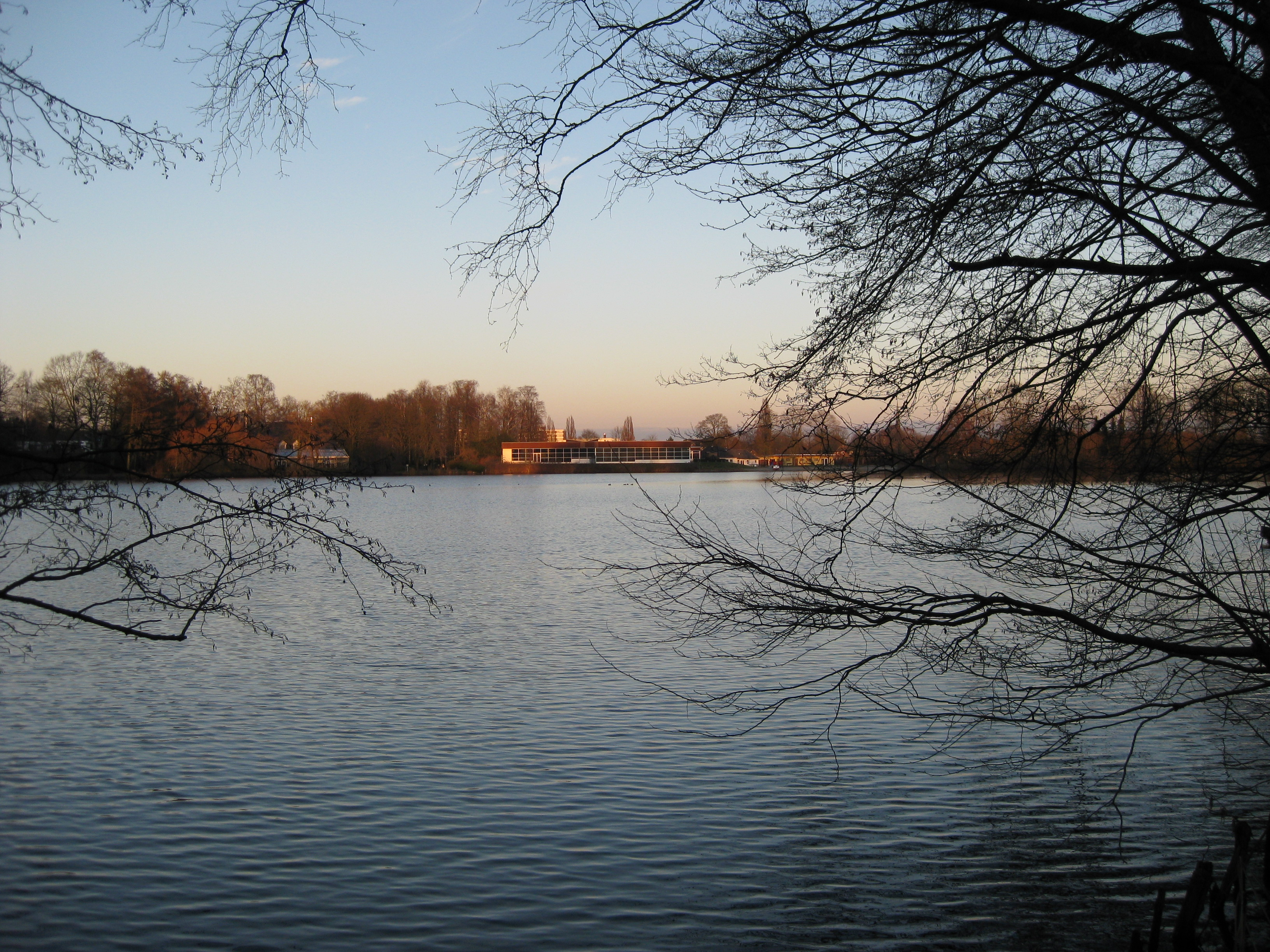
Rantzauer See

- Rammsee
- Rantzauer See
- Ratzeburger See
- Redingsdorfer See
- Rosensee
- Vorderer Russee

=== S ===
- Salemer See
- Sarnekower See
- Schaalsee
- Scharsee
- Schieren See
- Schmalensee
- Schulensee
- Schulsee
- Schwanensee
- Schwartauer See
- Schwarzsee (Mölln)
- Schwonausee
- Großer Segeberger See
- Seedorfer See
- Seekamper See
- Selenter See
- Sibbersdorfer See
- Stadtsee (Mölln)
- Stolper See
- Süseler See

=== T ===
- Taschensee
- Tonteich
- Trammer See
- Trenter See
- Treßsee
- Tröndelsee

=== U ===
- Ukleisee

=== V ===
- Vierer See

=== W ===
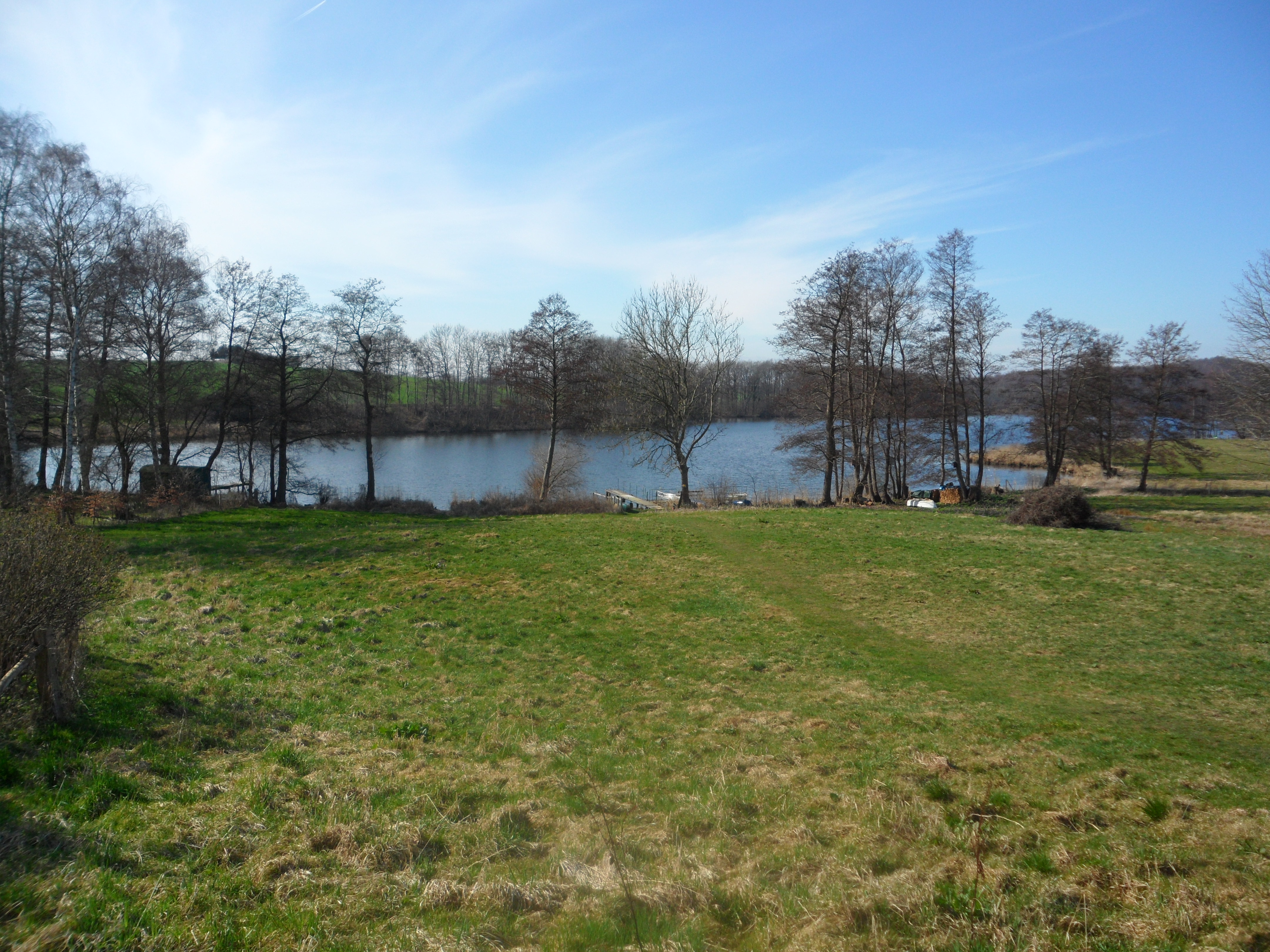
Wielener See

- Wardersee bei Bad Segeberg
- Wardersee (Kreis Rendsburg-Eckernförde)
- Wellsee
- Westensee
- Wielener See
- Windebyer Noor
- Wittensee

== Rivers and streams ==
See list of rivers of Schleswig-Holstein

== Canals ==
- Alster-Beste Canal
- Breitenburg Canal
- Düker Canal
- Eider Canal
- Elbe-Lübeck Canal
- Gieselau Canal
- Kiel Canal
- Schaalsee Canal
- Stecknitz Canal

== Coastal waters ==
=== Baltic Sea ===
- Bay of Kiel
  - Flensburg Fjord
    - Bay of Geltingen
  - Eckernförde Bay
  - Schlei
  - Kiel Fjord
  - Fehmarnsund
- Fehmarn Belt
- Bay of Mecklenburg
  - Bay of Lübeck
  - Bay of Neustadt

=== North Sea ===
- Helgoland Bight
  - Lister Tief
  - Hörnum Tief
  - Vortrapptief
  - Heverstrom
    - Mittelhever
    - Norderhever
    - Süderhever
  - Norder Aue
  - Süder Aue
  - Rütergat
  - Schmaltief
  - Purrenstrom
  - Wesselburener Loch
  - Bay of Meldorf
    - Piep

== See also ==
- List of lakes in Schleswig-Holstein
