= List of lakes of Schleswig-Holstein =

This List of lakes in Schleswig-Holstein shows a selection of well-known lakes in the North German state of Schleswig-Holstein (sorted by surface area):

| Name | Area | Height in m above NN | Extent in km | Location | Coordinates | Greatest depth |
|---|---|---|---|---|---|---|
| Großer Plöner See | 30 km^{2} | 21 m | ca. 30 km | south of Plön | | 58 m |
| Selenter See | 22.4 km^{2} | 37 m | ca. 29 km | north of Selent | | 36 m |
| Ratzeburger See | 13 km^{2} | 4 m | ca. 23 km | 14 km southeast of Lübeck | | 24 m |
| Tresdorfer See | 11.7 km^{2} | | | north of Plön | | 14.7 m |
| Wittensee | 9.9 km^{2} | 4 m | ca. 14 km | 9 km northeast of Rendsburg | | 21 m |
| Westensee | 6.8 km^{2} | 6 m | ca. 23 km | 10 km west of Kiel | | 18 m |
| Kellersee | 5.6 km^{2} | 24 m | ca. 15 km | 5 km north of Eutin | | 26 m |
| Großer Binnensee | 4.8 km^{2} | m | ca. 11.4 km | northeast of Lütjenburg | | 3 m |
| Hemmelsdorfer See | 4.6 km^{2} | m | ca. 15.5 km | north of Lübeck | | 39 m |
| Windebyer Noor | 3.9 km^{2} | m | ca. 10 km | west of Eckernförde | | 14 m |
| Dieksee | 3.86 km^{2} | 22 m | ca. 12.5 km | west of Malente | | 38 m |
| Lanker See | 3.7 km^{2} | 19 m | ca. 15 km | south of Preetz | | 21 m |
| Wardersee | 3.5 km^{2} | 25 m | ca. 20 km | ca. 10 km east of Bad Segeberg | | 25 m |
| Dobersdorfer See | 3.2 km^{2} | 19 m | ca. 10 km | 10 km east of Kiel | | 19 m |
| Postsee | 2.9 km^{2} | 21 m | ca. 13 km | 4 km west of Preetz | | 9 m |
| Behler See | 2.77 km^{2} | 22 m | ca. 9 km | 4 km northeast of Plön | | 43 m |
| Passader See | 2.7 km^{2} | 19 m | ca. 9 km | 12 km east of Kiel | | 11 m |
| Kleiner Plöner See | 2.39 km^{2} | 20 m | ca. 11 km | nordwest of Plön | | 31 m |
| Großer Eutiner See | 2.2 km^{2} | 27 m | ca. 11 km | east of Eutin | | 16 m |
| Stocksee | 2.1 km^{2} | 28 m | ca. 11 km | 8 km east of Bornhöved | | 30 m |
| Küchensee (Ratzeburg) | 1.8 km^{2} | 4 m | ca. 6.7 km | south of Ratzeburg | | 15 m |
| Einfelder See | 1.7 km^{2} | 27 m | ca. 8.5 km | 7 km north of Neumünster | | 8 m |
| Großer Segeberger See | 1.7 km^{2} | 29 m | ca. 8.3 km | northeast of Bad Segeberg | | 12 m |
| Trammer See | 1.6 km^{2} | 20 m | 7.9 km | north of Plön | | 33.4 m |
| Bistensee | 1.5 km^{2} | 12 m | ca. 7.4 km | 8 km northeast of Rendsburg | | 15 m |
| Bothkamper See | 1.4 km^{2} | 24 m | ca. 8.3 km | 6 km northeast of Bordesholm | | 2.5 m |
| Langsee | 1.37 km^{2} | 16 m | ca. 11.5 km | north of Schleswig | | 13 m |
| Stolper See | 1.33 km^{2} | 27 m | ca. 5.7 km | 2 km northeast of Wankendorf | | 15 m |
| Vierer See | 1.32 km^{2} | 19 m | 3.2 k | near Bösdorf | | 18.8 m |
| Mözener See | 1.22 km^{2} | 18 m | ca. 8 km | west of Bad Segeberg | | 8 m |
| Belauer See | 1.2 km^{2} | 29 m | ca. 5.7 km | 5 km northeast of Bornhöved | | 26 m |
| Brahmsee | 1.1 km^{2} | 19 m | ca. 5.3 km | 5 km northeast of Nortorf | | 10 m |
| Großer Pönitzer See | 1.1 km^{2} | 19 m | ca. 4.3 km | southeast of Pönitz | | 19 m |
| Schöhsee | 0.78 km^{2} |
| Bordesholmer See | 0.7 km^{2} | 25 m | ca. 5 km | 10 km north of Neumünster | | 8 m |
| Wardersee | 0.6 km^{2} | 19 m | ca. 4.4 km | 5 km northeast of Nortorf | | 9 m |
| Ihlsee | 0.291 km^{2} | 27.7 m | ca. 2.2 km | Nordwestrand Bad Segeberg | | 21.5 m |
| Wellsee | 0.25 km^{2} | 29 m | ca. 3.3 km | southeast of Kiel | | 3 m |
| Bültsee | 0.20 km^{2} | 9.4 m | ca. 2.4 km | between Schleswig and Eckernförde | | 13.4 m |
| Garrensee | 0.18 km^{2} | 41.8 m | ca. 2.4 km | southeast of Ratzeburg | | 23 m |
| Großer Benzer See | 0.13 km^{2} | | c. 0.6 km | | | 15.8m |

== See also ==
- List of lakes in Germany
- List of waterbodies in Schleswig-Holstein
