= List of nature reserves in Schleswig-Holstein =

This sortable list contains all 188 nature reserves in Schleswig-Holstein, the northernmost state in Germany (as at: 1 December 2007). Their official names and numbers are used unless otherwise stated.

NSG Nr.	Name of the nature reserve	District / Town	Area (ha)	Date established
1	Nord-Sylt	Nordfriesland	1.785,87	23.05.1980
2	Os bei Süderbrarup	Schleswig-Flensburg	26,88	12.08.2003
3	Oehe–Schleimünde Bird Sanctuary	Schleswig-Flensburg	366,04	14.07.1987
4	Salemer Moor and surrounding woods and lakes	Herzogtum Lauenburg	690,56	05.07.2006
5	Hamburger Hallig	Nordfriesland	501,74	16.04.1930
6	Tetenhusen Moor	Schleswig-Flensburg	208,80	03.03.1932
8	Geltinger Birk	Schleswig-Flensburg	767,58	23.12.1986
9	Kampener Vogelkoje on Sylt	Nordfriesland	9,91	18.03.1935
10	Nordspitze Amrum on the island of Amrum	Nordfriesland	67,84	29.10.1936
11	Sorgwohld	Rendsburg-Eckernförde	39,16	06.11.1936
12	Dassower See and islands of Buchhorst and Graswerder (Plönswerder)	Stadt Lübeck	815,81	07.02.1983
13	Fröruper Berge	Schleswig-Flensburg	85,71	02.12.1936
14	Wattenmeer north of the Hindenburg Dyke	Nordfriesland	626,70	02.12.1936
15	Düne am Treßsee	Schleswig-Flensburg	10,27	20.05.1937
16	Rickelsbüller Koog	Nordfriesland	517,09	11.11.1982
17	Grüner Brink	Ostholstein	140,37	22.12.1989
18	Reher Kratt	Steinburg	15,23	31.01.1938
19	Herrenmoor bei Kleve	Steinburg	219,89	23.12.1985
20	Wittmoor	Dithmarschen	249,04	25.11.1992
21	Lütjenholmer Heidedünen	Nordfriesland	18,46	22.02.1938
22	Heathland near Kellinghusen	Steinburg	15,30	02.03.1938
23	Hahnheide	Stormarn	1.375,49	02.03.1938
24	Düne am Rimmelsberg	Schleswig-Flensburg	6,21	20.06.1938
25	Lebrade Pond Bird Sanctuary	Plön	144,09	18.06.1938
26	Bordelum Heath and Langenhorn Heath and environs	Nordfriesland	196,94	16.12.1991
27	Kleve	Dithmarschen	13,07	08.11.1962
28	Süderlügumer Binnendünen	Nordfriesland	39,33	07.11.1938
29	Peninsula and bights in the Lanker See	Plön	209,43	17.01.1995
30	Barker Heide	Segeberg	629,57	12.06.2003
31	Pobüller Bauernholz	Schleswig-Flensburg	4,44	01.03.1939
32	Barkauer See and environs	Ostholstein	134,77	11.11.1982
33	Süderberge near Süderlügum	Nordfriesland	9,10	07.11.1938
34	Haseldorfer Binnenelbe mit Elbvorland	Pinneberg	2.060,66	12.04.1987
36	Löwenstedter Sandberge	Nordfriesland	14,54	10.07.1939
37	Bottsand	Plön	90,27	05.11.1987
38	Heidmoor	Segeberg	68,76	16.12.1991
39	Hechtmoor	Schleswig-Flensburg	34,37	02.09.1941
40	Groß Wittenseer Moor	Rendsburg-Eckernförde	15,73	25.02.1942
41	Kaltenhofer Moor	Rendsburg-Eckernförde	52,23	25.02.1942
42	Weißenhäuser Brök	Ostholstein	59,17	19.08.1942
43	Halloher Moor, Brandsheide and Könster Moor	Segeberg	50,20	09.12.1942
44	Ihlsee und Ihlwald	Segeberg	42,16	21.03.1950
45	Dithmarscher Eidervorland mit Watt	Dithmarschen, Nordfriesland	794,67	22.12.1989
46	Haithabu–Dannewerk	Schleswig-Flensburg	88,10	22.09.1952
47	Hoisdorfer Teiche	Stormarn	29,89	20.11.1987
48	Neßsand	Pinneberg	10,99	30.08.1952
49	Bokelhomer Fischteiche	Rendsburg-Eckernförde	368,00	30.04.1993
50	Westufer des Einfelder Sees	Stadt Neumünster	12,39	12.11.1987
51	Ascheberger Warder im Großen Plöner See	Plön	10,67	26.04.1955
52	Dellstedter Birkwildmoor	Dithmarschen	618,58	23.01.1957
53	Kleiner Binnensee and adjacent salt meadows	Plön	108,49	25.02.1957
54	Methhorstteich and Rümlandteich	Rendsburg-Eckernförde	45,21	20.09.1957
55	Dummersdorfer Ufer	Stadt Lübeck	337,08	13.12.1991
57	Eichkratt Schirlbusch	Nordfriesland	12,17	20.02.1959
58	Wesseker See	Ostholstein	238,58	03.02.1961
59	Bewerlohmoor	Segeberg	2,75	06.02.1961
60	Rantumbecken	Nordfriesland	566,77	29.11.1983
61	Katenmoor, Schindermoor, Dewsbeeker Moor und Schapbrooker Moor	Segeberg	17,35	26.10.1962
62	Lummenfelsen der Insel Helgoland	Pinneberg	1,07	08.05.1964
63	Esprehmer Moor	Schleswig-Flensburg	37,54	29.07.1965
64	Ahrenviölfelder Westermoor	Nordfriesland	66,44	24.10.1989
65	Wulfsfelder Moor	Segeberg	6,33	27.07.1962
66	Geschendorfer Moor	Segeberg	11,81	17.02.1966
67	Schwarzberger Moor	Nordfriesland	17,40	17.02.1966
68	Lundtop	Schleswig-Flensburg	13,92	08.06.1967
69	Graswarder Heiligenhafen	Ostholstein	228,49	29.12.1987
70	Tröndelsee und Umgebung	Stadt Kiel	28,25	26.09.1983
71	Erlenbruch	Nordfriesland	4,71	02.08.1968
72	Schwansmoor und Kranichmoor	Nordfriesland	80,16	01.08.1968
73	Morsum-Kliff	Nordfriesland	43,20	09.08.1968
74	Stellbrookmoor	Segeberg	34,69	14.10.1968
75	Amrumer Dünen	Nordfriesland	711,46	19.03.1971
76	Oberalsterniederung	Segeberg, Stormarn	907,90	07.07.2004
77	Oldensworter Vorland	Nordfriesland	265,54	16.12.1993
78	Rantumer Dünen/Sylt	Nordfriesland	349,88	02.12.1973
79	Hörnum–Odde/Sylt	Nordfriesland	66,67	02.12.1972
81	Mittlerer Stocksee und Umgebung	Segeberg	96,44	03.04.1974
82	Ahrensviöler Südermoor	Nordfriesland	7,24	02.12.1972
83	Delver Koog	Dithmarschen	190,07	24.09.1976
84	Rixdorfer Teich und Umgebung	Plön	115,29	29.03.1974
85	Wester-Spätinge	Nordfriesland	27,04	09.02.1978
86	Nordfriesisches Wattenmeer	Nordfriesland	4.495,78	23.08.1982
87	Reesholm/Schlei	Schleswig-Flensburg	117,36	30.08.1976
88	Pugumer See und Umgebung	Schleswig-Flensburg	89,72	05.01.1978
89	Wallnau/Fehmarn	Ostholstein	298,55	23.12.1977
90	Krummsteert–Sulsdorfer Wiek/Fehmarn	Ostholstein	342,45	09.10.1980
91	Helgoländer Felssockel	Pinneberg	5.467,11	24.04.1981
92	Brenner Moor	Stormarn	22,84	20.10.1978
93	Nordteil des Selenter Sees und Umgebung	Plön	760,22	15.11.1978
94	Seedorfer See und Umgebung	Segeberg	177,68	13.01.1978
95	Stellmoor–Ahrensburger Tunneltal	Stormarn	334,05	16.08.1982
96	Nielönn/Sylt	Nordfriesland	67,39	05.03.1979
97	Braderuper Heide/Sylt	Nordfriesland	127,23	05.03.1979
98	Baakdeel–Rantum/Sylt	Nordfriesland	202,96	05.03.1979
99	Dünenlandschaft auf dem Roten Kliff/Sylt	Nordfriesland	151,42	05.03.1979
100	Nienwohlder Moor	Segeberg, Stormarn	455,11	25.03.1982
101	Weißes Moor	Dithmarschen	50,91	03.04.1979
102	Fröslev-Jardelunder Moor	Schleswig-Flensburg	224,55	30.05.1984
103	Inseln im Großen Plöner See und Halbinsel Störland	Plön	260,28	25.11.1992
104	Bültsee und Umgebung	Rendsburg-Eckernförde	57,41	03.06.1982
105	Bewaldete Düne bei Noer	Rendsburg-Eckernförde	46,09	17.07.1981
106	Hansdorfer Brook	Stormarn	264,59	08.07.1981
107	Überschwemmungswiesen Jägerslust	Rendsburg-Eckernförde	16,21	05.10.1982
108	Sehlendorfer Binnensee und Umgebung	Plön	226,79	22.12.1989
109	Wittmoor	Segeberg, Stormarn	106,31	08.10.1981
110	Dosenmoor	Stadt Neumünster, Plön, Rendsburg-Eckernförde	546,11	18.03.1988
111	Baggersee Hohenfelde	Steinburg	23,35	23.12.1985
112	Schellbruch	Stadt Lübeck	147,16	30.11.1981
113	Borstgrasrasen bei Alt Mölln	Herzogtum Lauenburg	11,96	23.12.1985
114	Schwentine Oxbow Lake (Altarm der Schwentine)	Plön	18,85	27.08.1984
115	Kossautal	Plön	105,73	31.12.1984
116	Barsbeker See und Umgebung	Plön	148,49	14.09.1982
117	Fuhlensee und Umgebung	Plön	41,71	15.12.1983
118	Aalbek-Niederung	Ostholstein	310,19	31.12.1984
119	Neustädter Binnenwasser	Ostholstein	276,19	31.12.1984
120	Schulensee und Umgebung	Rendsburg-Eckernförde, Stadt Kiel	65,30	31.07.1986
121	Mühlenbachtal bei Trittau	Stormarn	92,40	05.06.1986
122	Billetal	Herzogtum Lauenburg, Stormarn	190,36	14.08.1987
123	Baggerkuhle Gribbohm	Steinburg	18,84	23.12.1986
124	Kronenloch/Speicherkoog Dithmarschen	Dithmarschen	532,38	23.12.1985
125	Wöhrdener Loch/Speicherkoog Dithmarschen	Dithmarschen	496,96	16.12.1994
126	Schwansener See	Rendsburg-Eckernförde	202,00	29.12.1987
127	Oldenburger See und Umgebung	Herzogtum Lauenburg	123,14	24.09.1986
128	Lütjensee und Hochfelder See südöstlich Gut Bothkamp	Plön	149,14	13.12.1990
129	Schaalsee und Niendorfer Binnensee, Priestersee und Großzecher Küchensee, Pfuhlsee, Seedorfer Küchensee und Umgebung	Herzogtum Lauenburg	1.795,17	16.12.1994
130	Hellbachtal mit Lottsee, Krebssee und Schwarzsee	Herzogtum Lauenburg	163,62	22.07.1987
131	Moorgebiet Kranika	Stormarn	95,74	16.12.1993
132	Lübbersdorfer Kiesgrube	Ostholstein	9,94	22.12.1989
133	Talhänge bei Göttin	Herzogtum Lauenburg	71,05	29.03.1990
134	Trendelmoor	Herzogtum Lauenburg	12,60	20.11.1987
135	Dannauer See und Umgebung	Plön	43,47	20.04.1993
136	Grüne Insel mit Eiderwatt	Dithmarschen, Nordfriesland	981,10	15.12.1989
137	Tal der Langballigau	Schleswig-Flensburg	129,53	13.12.1990
138	Holmmoor	Pinneberg	110,06	22.03.1994
139	Eschschallen im Seestermüher Vorland	Pinneberg	277,71	02.04.1991
140	Ahrensee und nordöstlicher Westensee	Rendsburg-Eckernförde	116,75	19.05.1988
141	Wennebeker Moor und Wennebekniederung	Rendsburg-Eckernförde	368,00	30.04.1993
142	Hohes Elbufer zwischen Tesperhude und Lauenburg	Herzogtum Lauenburg	468,53	12.01.1993
143	Besenhorster Sandberge und Elbsandwiesen	Herzogtum Lauenburg	150,59	14.12.1993
144	Alte Sorge-Schleife	Schleswig-Flensburg	658,88	19.09.1991
145	Wildes Moor bei Schwabstedt	Nordfriesland	636,55	25.11.1992
146	Beltringharder Koog	Nordfriesland	3.372,68	19.12.1991
147	Buttermoor/Butterbargsmoor	Pinneberg	109,05	14.12.1992
148	Liether Kalkgrube	Pinneberg	15,51	18.10.1991
149	Fieler Moor	Dithmarschen	258,26	16.12.1993
150	Büchener Sander	Herzogtum Lauenburg	100,52	12.12.1990
151	Ehemalige Baggergrube östlich Basedow	Herzogtum Lauenburg	57,41	16.12.1991
152	Mechower Seeufer	Herzogtum Lauenburg	30,62	04.11.1992
153	Eichenkratt und Kiesgrube südlich Böxlund	Schleswig-Flensburg	23,02	13.12.1990
154	Kronswarder und südlicher Teil des Großen Binnensees	Plön	151,55	13.12.1990
155	Halbinsel Holnis	Schleswig-Flensburg	364,87	30.04.1993
156	Hohner See	Rendsburg-Eckernförde	368,00	30.04.1993
157	Strandseelandschaft bei Schmoel	Plön	54,76	12.12.1990
158	Ehemaliger Fuhlensee	Dithmarschen	22,76	14.12.1990
159	Culpiner See	Herzogtum Lauenburg	28,76	08.10.1993
160	Lankower Seeufer, Grammsee und Umgebung	Herzogtum Lauenburg	188,76	08.11.1994
161	Tävsmoor/Haselauer Moor	Pinneberg	154,27	18.04.1995
162	Goldenseeufer und Umgebung	Herzogtum Lauenburg	50,23	24.09.1993
163	Elbinsel Pagensand	Pinneberg	528,25	09.05.1997
164	Rhinplate und Elbufer südlich Glückstadt	Steinburg	473,60	05.12.2000
165	Dalbekschlucht	Herzogtum Lauenburg	74,65	22.12.1994
166	Stapelfelder Moor	Stormarn	15,34	06.11.1995
167	Heidkoppelmoor und Umgebung	Stormarn	62,46	19.05.1995
168	Lauenburger Elbvorland	Herzogtum Lauenburg	56,33	12.08.1995
169	Ostufer des Großen Ratzeburger Sees	Herzogtum Lauenburg	237,66	02.03.2000
170	Kasseedorfer Teiche und Umgebung	Ostholstein	131,01	22.08.1996
171	Spülflächen Schachtholm	Rendsburg-Eckernförde	124,39	17.01.1995
172	Kührener Teich und Umgebung	Plön	78,55	21.12.1994
173	Pantener Moorweiher und Umgebung	Herzogtum Lauenburg	146,79	20.12.1996
174	Ehemaliger Fieler See	Dithmarschen	131,02	22.12.1998
175	Oldenburger Bruch	Ostholstein	355,10	07.12.1998
176	Steinerne Rinne und Mechower Holz	Herzogtum Lauenburg	188,95	02.08.2004
177	Wakenitz	Herzogtum Lauenburg, Stadt Lübeck	599,57	20.04.1999
178	Südlicher Priwall	Stadt Lübeck	147,20	19.08.1998
179	Tönsheider Wald	Rendsburg-Eckernförde	64,64	10.10.1995
180	Ruppersdorfer See	Ostholstein	74,26	09.11.1999
181	Middelburger Seen	Ostholstein	118,74	09.12.1999
182	Oberer Herrenteich	Stormarn	66,07	01.11.1999
183	Höltigbaum	Stormarn	285,49	15.12.1997
184	Fockbeker Moor	Rendsburg-Eckernförde	380,35	03.09.2002
186	Twedter Feld	Stadt Flensburg	89,18	20.03.2003
187	Ammersbek-Niederung	Stormarn	328,42	29.05.2002
188	Hevenbruch	Herzogtum Lauenburg	179,81	01.04.2003
189	Stecknitz-Delvenau-Niederung	Herzogtum Lauenburg	613,34	27.02.2002
190	Suhrer See und Umgebung	Plön	269,91	13.08.2003
191	Ritzerauer Hofsee und Duvenseebachniederung	Herzogtum Lauenburg	120,45	30.06.2004
197	Talwald Hahnenkoppel	Stormarn	32,79	07.07.2004
201	Grönauer Heide, Grönauer Moor und Blankensee	Herzogtum Lauenburg, Stadt Lübeck	352,11	19.07.2006

== Sources ==
- InfoNet-Umwelt Schleswig-Holstein (in German)
- Additional environmental information from the Schleswig-Holstein State Office for Nature and the Environment (in German)
