= Garren Lake =

Garren Lake may refer to:

- Garrensee, lake in Switzerland
- Garren Stitt (often credited as Garren Lake; born 2003), American actor
