= Gösebek =

River of Schleswig-Holstein, Germany

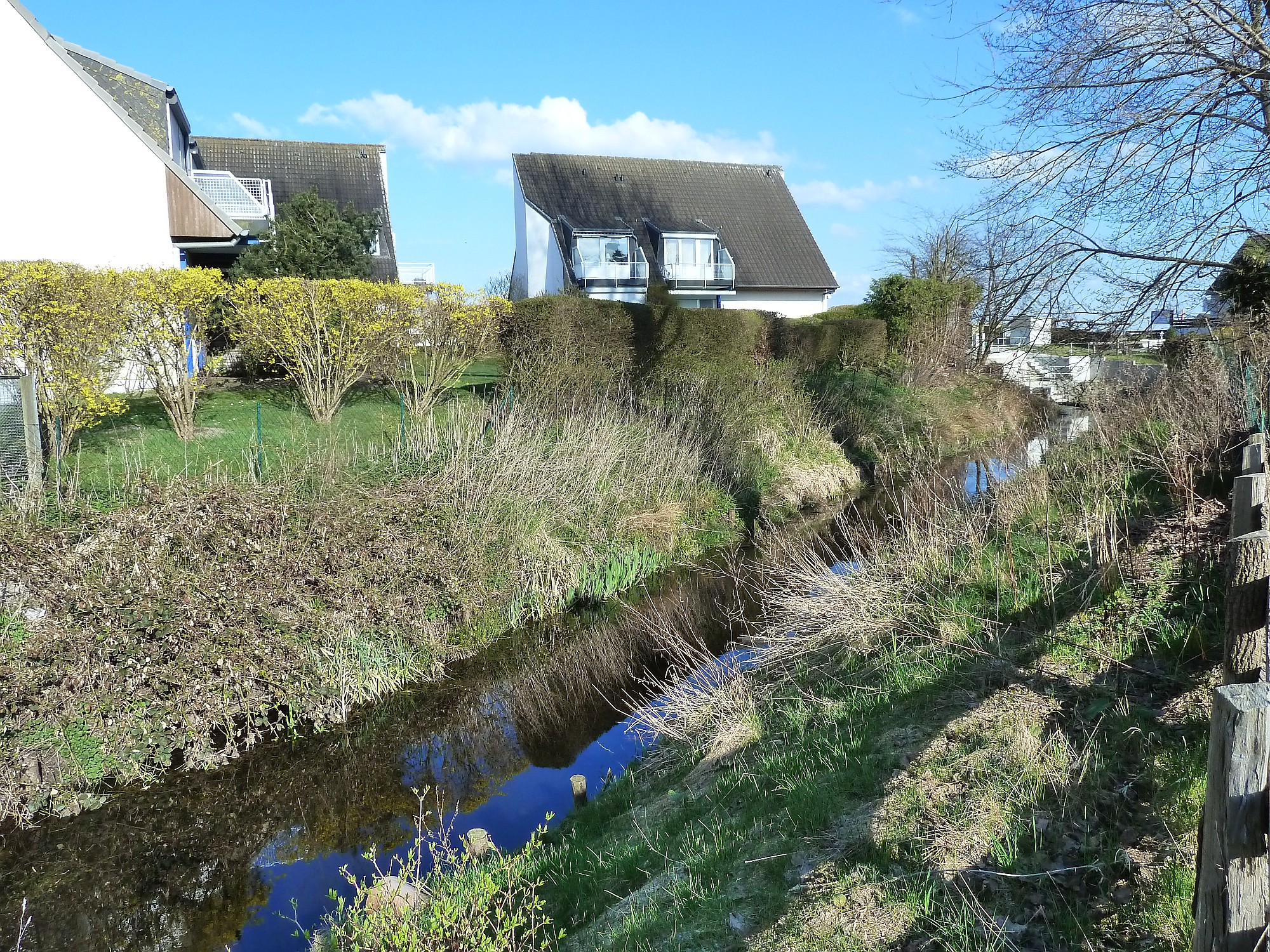
- The Gösebek, just before the pumping station in Haffkrug.

Location
- Country: Germany
- States: Schleswig-Holstein

Physical characteristics
- Mouth
  - location: Baltic Sea
  - coordinates: 54.0394°N 10.7505°E

The Gösebek (also Göselbek, Göschbek oder Göschbeek – low German for "Goose Brook") is a river in Ostholstein, Schleswig-Holstein, Germany. It drains at the Pönitzer Seenplatte and flows into the Baltic Sea in Scharbeutz.

From the north, it flows southward through Süseler See and Kleiner Pönitzer See before flowing eastward toward the Baltic Sea. Since 1949, the waterway has been enclosed in a pipe between Taschensee and Großer Pönitzer See as it runs beneath Dänischer Graben. Originally two meteres in depth, the canal was built to supply water to Gronenberger Mühle and two other mills.

It originally emptied into Haffkrug Lagoon until the lagoon was drained using pumps. The Gösebek serves as a drainage channel for the meadows that sit below sea level and terminates at a pumping station that sits between Scharbeutz and Haffkrug.

== History ==
The name is derived from Burg Gosevelde, a Buchwaldt family castle destroyed in the Feud of 1366 with the Lübeckers. The ruins stand on the Gösebek's banks, south of the Gronenberg copper works.

In 1855, it was noted to flow into the Borgdorfer See, along with the Bellerbek river.

== See also ==
- List of rivers of Schleswig-Holstein
