= Neustadt in Holstein =

- Town
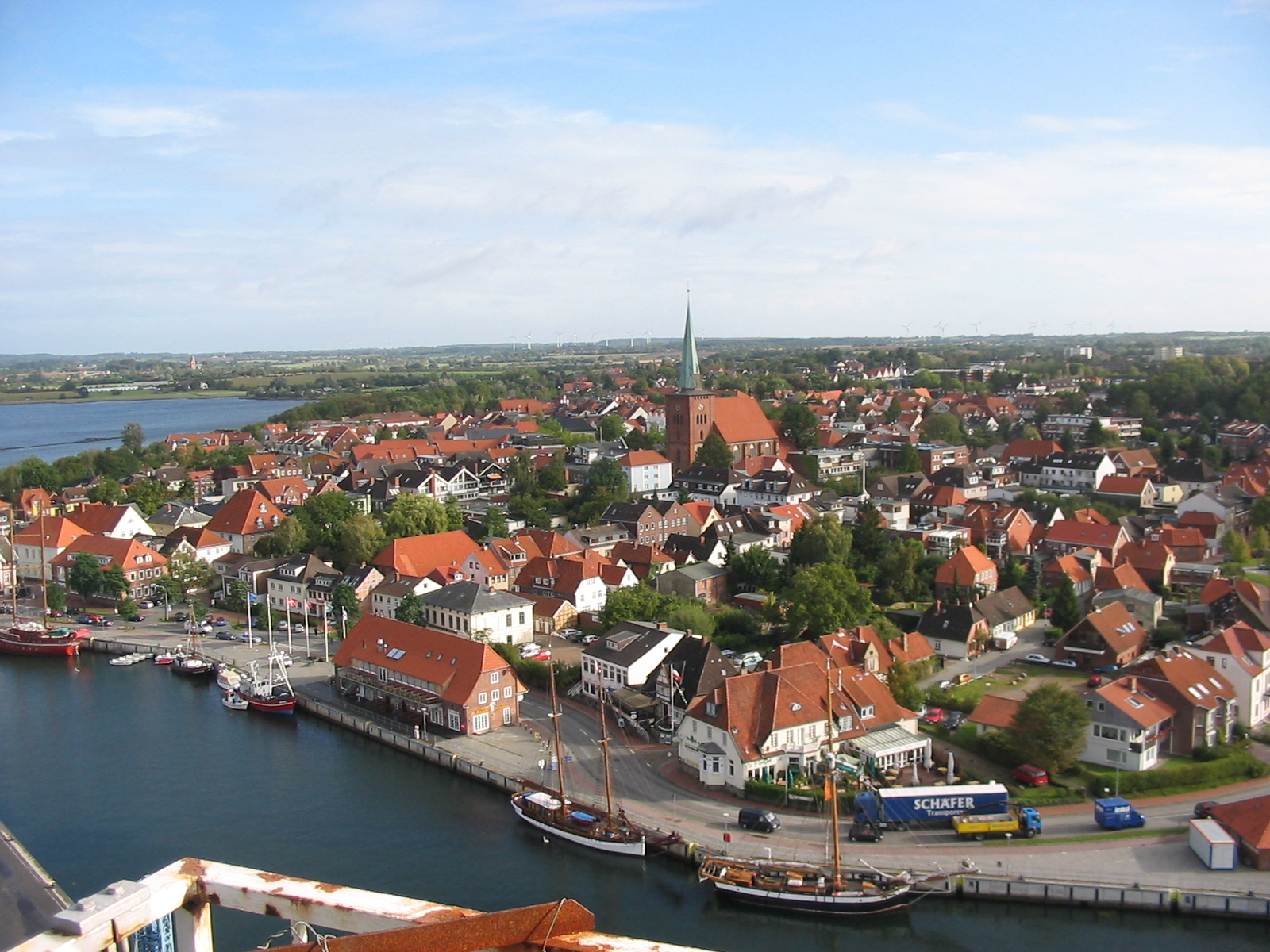
- Harbour and old town of Neustadt

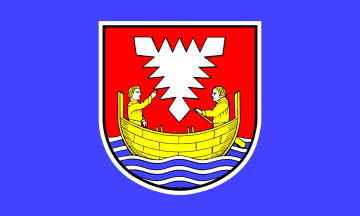
- Flag Coat of arms

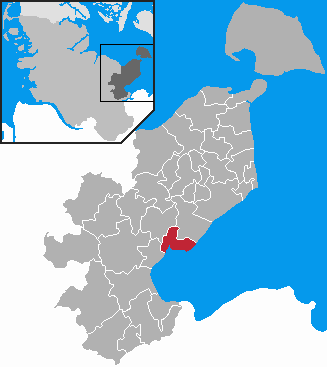
- Location of Neustadt in Holstein within Ostholstein district
- Interactive map of Neustadt in Holstein
- Location within Germany Location within Schleswig-Holstein
- Coordinates: 54°6′26″N 10°48′57″E
- Country: Germany
- State: Schleswig-Holstein
- District: Ostholstein

Government
  - Mayor: Mirko Spieckermann (Ind.)

Area
  - Total: 19.73 km^{2} (7.62 sq mi)
- Elevation: 16 m (52 ft)

Population (2025-12-31)
  - Total: 15,962
  - Density: 809.0/km^{2} (2,095/sq mi)
- Time zone: UTC+01:00 (CET)
  - Summer (DST): UTC+02:00 (CEST)
- Postal codes: 23730
- Dialling codes: 04561
- Vehicle registration: OH
- Website: www.stadt-neustadt.de

Neustadt in Holstein (German: [ˈnɔʏʃtat ʔɪn ˈhɔlʃtaɪn]; Holsatian: Niestadt in Holsteen) is a town in the district of Ostholstein, in Schleswig-Holstein, Germany, on the Bay of Lübeck 30 km northeast of Lübeck, and 50 km southeast of Kiel.

== History ==
In World War II, subcamp Number 1049 Neustadt in Holstein/Schleswig-Holstein was part of the Neuengamme concentration camp.

In the closing hours of the Second World War, several ships, including SS Cap Arcona, were sunk in the bay to the South of Neustadt. Almost 7,000 passengers from two of these ships, survivors of concentration camps, drowned swimming in 45-degree (Fahrenheit; 12.3 degrees Celsius) water toward the lighthouse on the Pelzerhaken shore or were shot by the Schutzstaffel upon reaching the shore. All passengers from a third ship, the SS Deutschland, survived.

== Economy ==
Peter Deilmann Cruises was headquartered in Neustadt in Holstein.

== Nature ==
The Neustädter Binnenwasser a brackish water lake borders Neustadt to the northwest.
