= Kossau =

Location
- Country: Germany
- State: Schleswig-Holstein

Physical characteristics
- Mouth
  - location: Baltic Sea
  - coordinates: 54.3357°N 10.6493°E

The Kossau is a stream in the district of Plön in eastern Schleswig-Holstein, Germany. It drains the lake Tresdorfer See and flows past Lütjenburg and through the Großer Binnensee before entering the Baltic Sea near Hohwacht. The stream was dammed near Rantzau Castle in the Middle Ages to form a lake which existed until the 18th century. It is about 22 kilometres (14 mi) long and most of its course consists of meanders. It is largely in a natural state and, together with its wet meadows, forms a rich habitat. The Kossau Valley is a designated nature reserve.

== See also ==
- List of rivers of Schleswig-Holstein
