= Großer Pönitzer See =

Body of water in Schleswig-Holstein, Germany

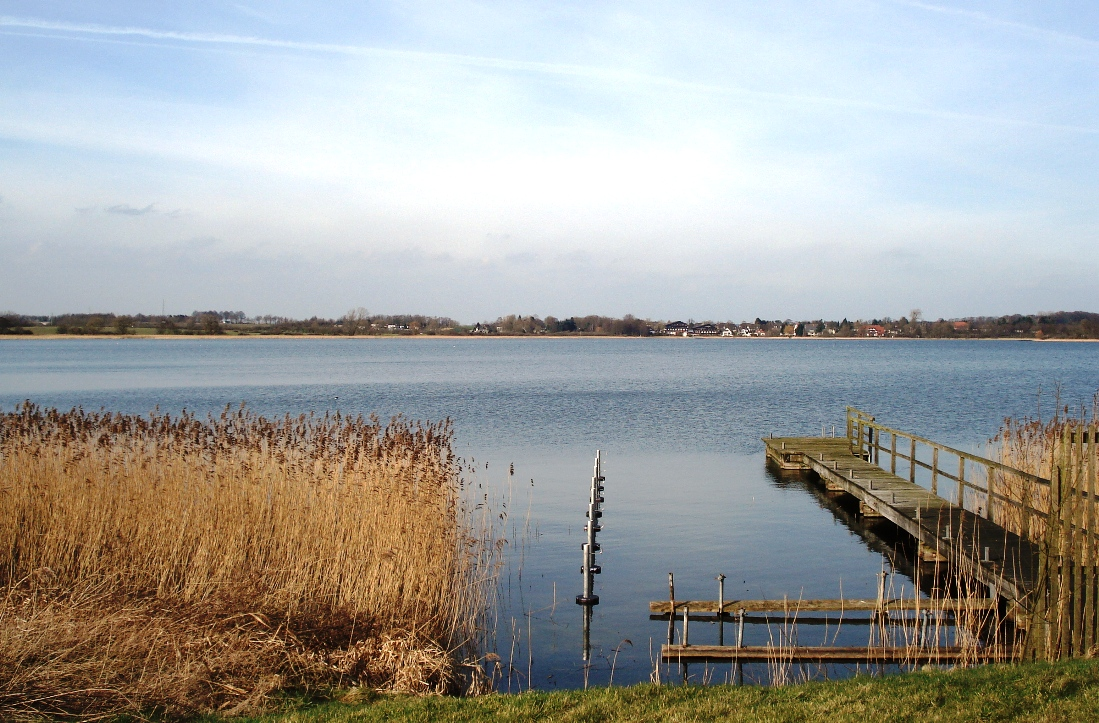

- Location within Schleswig-Holstein
- Location: Scharbeutz, Holsteinische Schweiz, Schleswig-Holstein
- Coordinates: 54.032°N 10.695°E
- Primary inflows: Gösebek
- Primary outflows: Gösebek
- Basin countries: Germany
- Max. length: 1.4 km (0.87 mi)
- Max. width: 1.1 km (0.68 mi)
- Surface area: 1.08 km^{2} (0.42 sq mi)
- Max. depth: 19.2 m (63 ft)

Großer Pönitzer See is a lake in Scharbeutz, Holsteinische Schweiz, Schleswig-Holstein, Germany. At an elevation of ???, its surface area is 1.08 km².
