= Krebssee =

Lake in Schleswig-Holstein, Germany

- Location within Schleswig-Holstein
- Location: Kreis Herzogtum Lauenburg, Schleswig-Holstein
- Coordinates: 53°34′26.6″N 10°43′55.2″E
- Basin countries: Germany
- Max. depth: 12 m (39 ft)

Krebssee is a lake in Kreis Herzogtum Lauenburg, Schleswig-Holstein, Germany.
