= Scharsee =

Lake in Germany

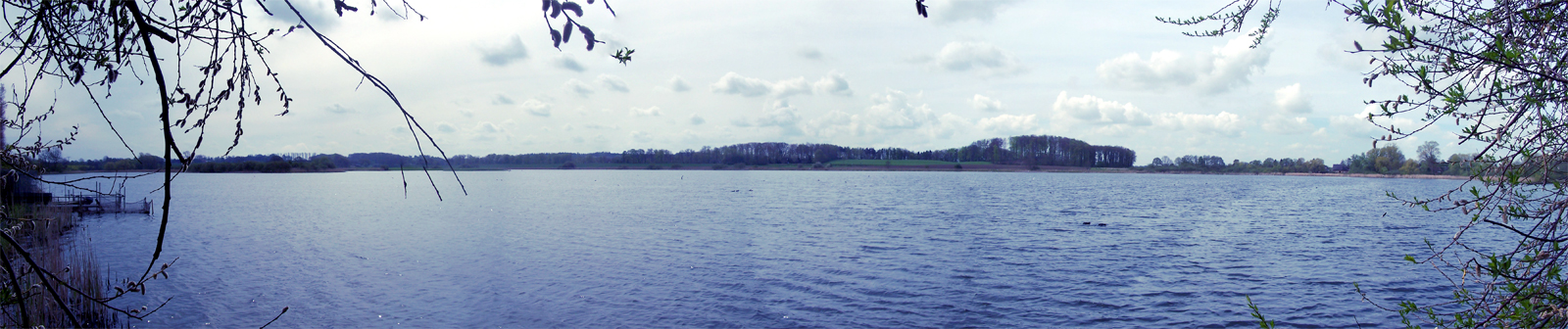

- Location within Schleswig-Holstein
- Location: Kreis Plön, Schleswig-Holstein
- Coordinates: 54°13′28″N 10°18′40″E
- Basin countries: Germany
- Surface area: 0.363 km^{2} (0.140 sq mi)
- Average depth: 1.6 m (5 ft 3 in)
- Max. depth: 2.9 m (9 ft 6 in)
- Surface elevation: 20.8 m (68 ft)
- Settlements: Preetz

Scharsee is a lake in Kreis Plön, Schleswig-Holstein, Germany. At an elevation of 20.8 m, its surface area is 0.363 km^{2}.
