= Vierer See =

Lake in Germany

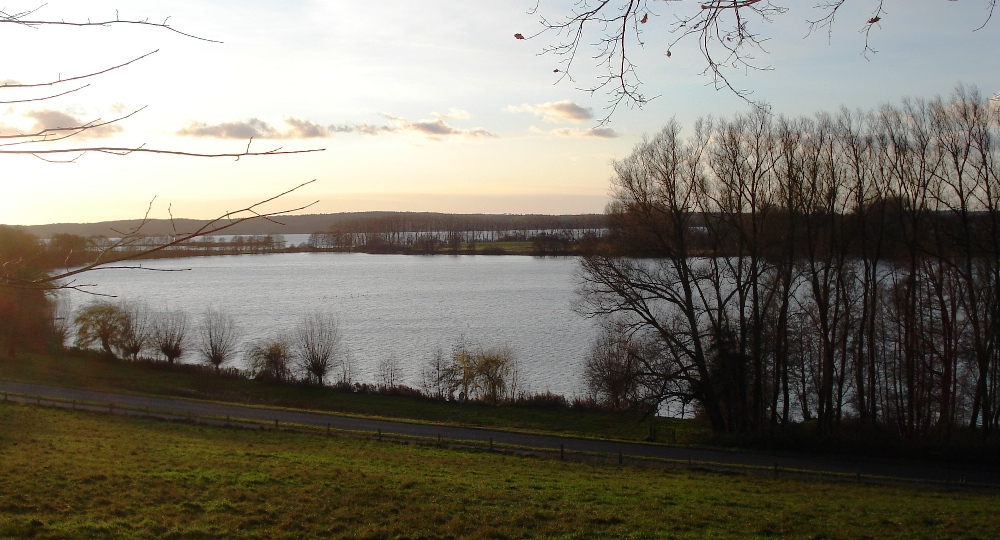

- Location within Schleswig-Holstein
- Location: Bösdorf, Holsteinische Schweiz, Schleswig-Holstein
- Coordinates: 54.12°N 10.44°E
- Primary inflows: Viererseegraben
- Basin countries: Germany
- Max. length: 3.2 km (2.0 mi)
- Max. width: 0.5 km (0.31 mi)
- Surface area: 1.32 km^{2} (0.51 sq mi)
- Max. depth: 18.8 m (62 ft)

Vierer See is a lake in Bösdorf, Holsteinische Schweiz, Schleswig-Holstein, Germany. At an elevation of 19 m, its surface area is 1.32 km^{2}.
