= Süseler See =

Lake in Süsel, Schleswig-Holstein, Germany

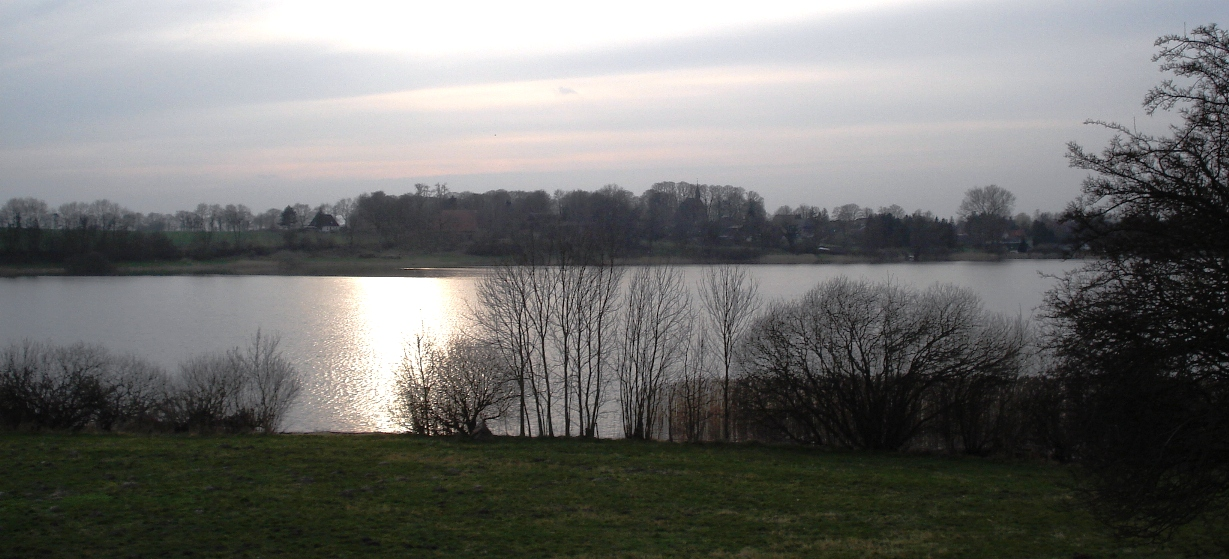

- Location within Schleswig-Holstein
- Location: Süsel, Kreis Ostholstein, Schleswig-Holstein
- Coordinates: 54.075°N 10.73°E
- Primary inflows: Gösebek
- Primary outflows: Gösebek
- Catchment area: 9.79 km^{2} (3.78 sq mi)
- Basin countries: Germany
- Max. length: 1.5 km (0.93 mi)
- Surface area: 0.77 km^{2} (0.30 sq mi)
- Max. depth: 9.3 m (31 ft)
- Surface elevation: 24 m (79 ft)

Süseler See is a lake in Süsel, Kreis Ostholstein, Schleswig-Holstein, Germany. It has a surface area of 0.753 km^{2} and a maximum depth of 9.3 m, with a catchment area of 9.77 km^{2}.
