= Lebrade Pond Bird Sanctuary =

Nature reserve in Schleswig-Holstein, Plön, Germany

Coordinates: 54°13′10″N 10°26′12″E

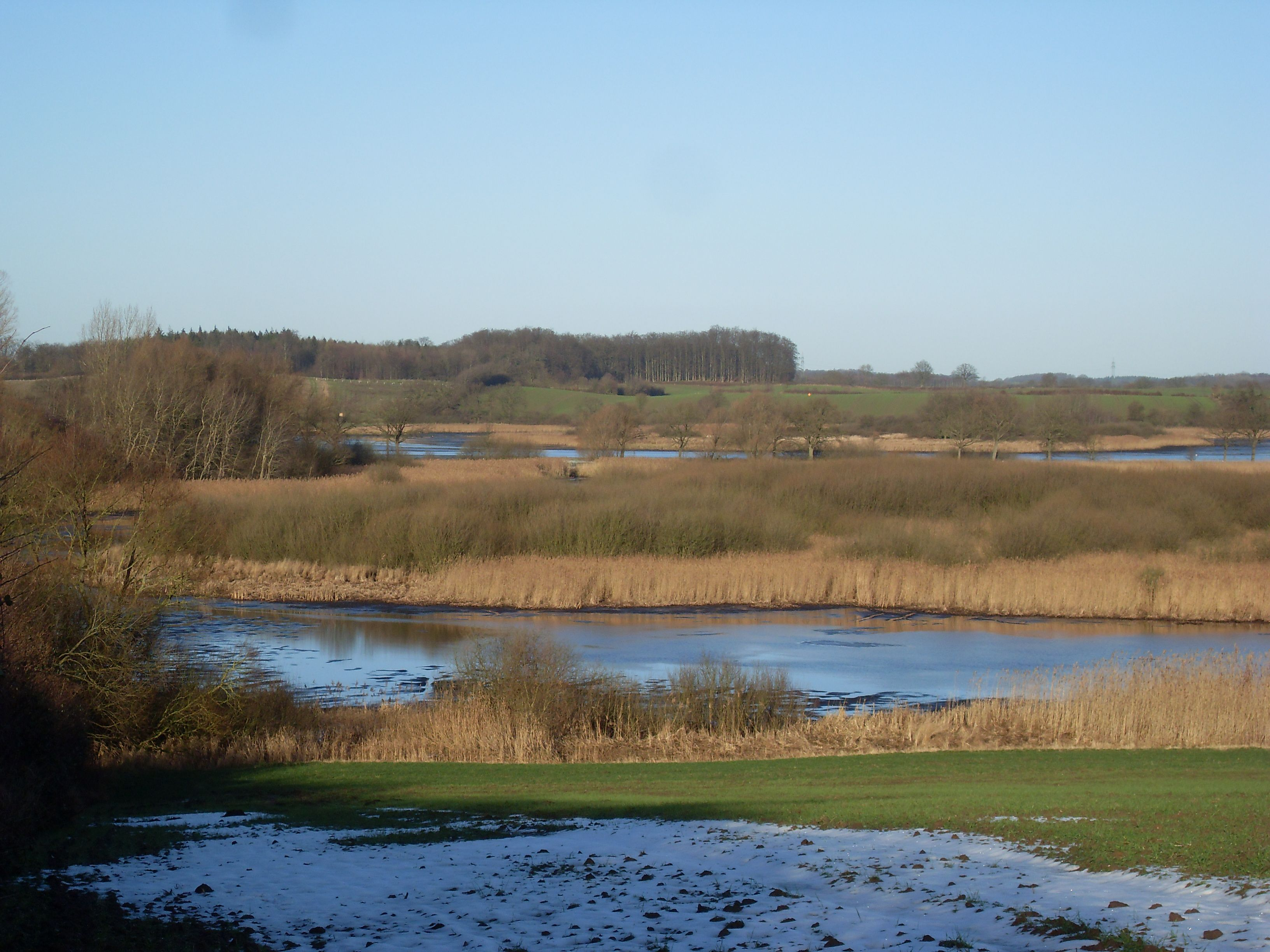
Lebrade Pond Bird Sanctuary from the south, Dec 2009

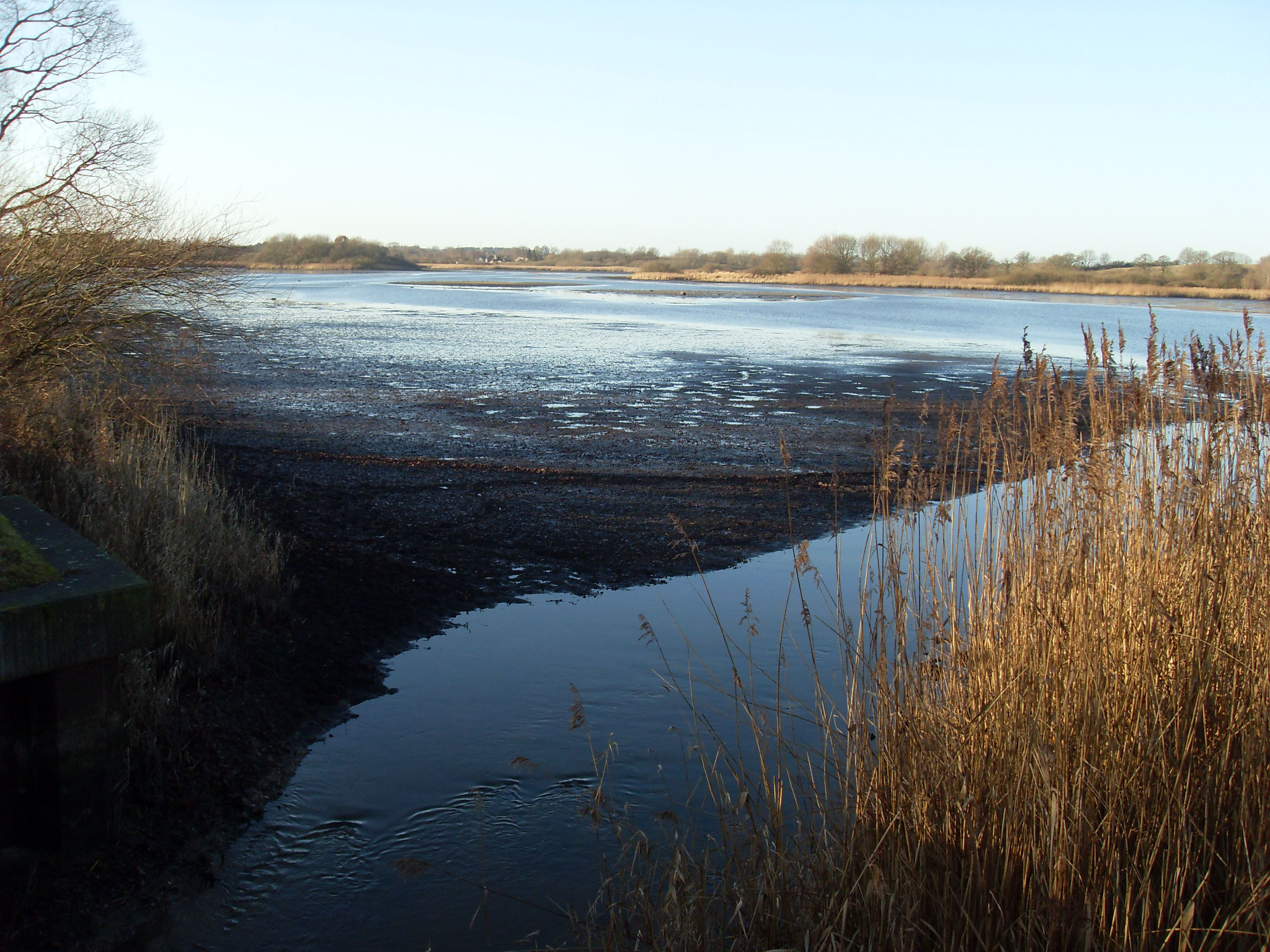
Lebrade Pond Bird Sanctuary from the L53 road

The Lebrade Pond Bird Sanctuary (German: Vogelfreistätte Lebrader Teich) is a nature reserve in the north German state of Schleswig-Holstein, that lies within the district of Plön, about 7 kilometres north of the town of Plön. The reserve is part of the Holstein Switzerland Nature Park and covers an area of about 144 hectares (360 acres). It has been designated as a Special Area of Conservation and therefore is part of the Natura 2000 network. It has a length of about 1.7 kilometres and a width of about one kilometre.

== History ==
The lakes were artificially laid out in the 17th century as fish ponds by the Rixdorf Estate for keeping and breeding carp. Today the large, very flat, drainable pond system continues to be extensively used, but it is no longer stocked with fish. The charitable Marius Böger Foundation for nature conservation and regional studies has rented the area. In winter the ponds are drained.

== Flora ==
The area is a group of natural eutrophic lakes that are of international importance for the conservation of migratory water birds. Next to the lakes are areas with a succession of vegetation types from reed beds, willows and wetlands to carr and bog.

== Fauna ==
In the area of the pond and succession growth there are in places rare breeding birds like the gadwall, mute swan and grebe. In addition, protected amphibians like the moor frog and the European fire-bellied toad are also found here.

== Use ==
The L53 district road runs Lebrade to Sellin through the area. Stopping en route is not permitted, but there is a good overview of the nature reserve from the road. There is an observation point in the northern part of the village of Lebrade. From here it is possible to have a good view of the birds in the area. In addition there is an information board here with details about the nature reserve and the birds to be found. The reserve has no footpath access.
