= Trenter See =

Lake in Germany

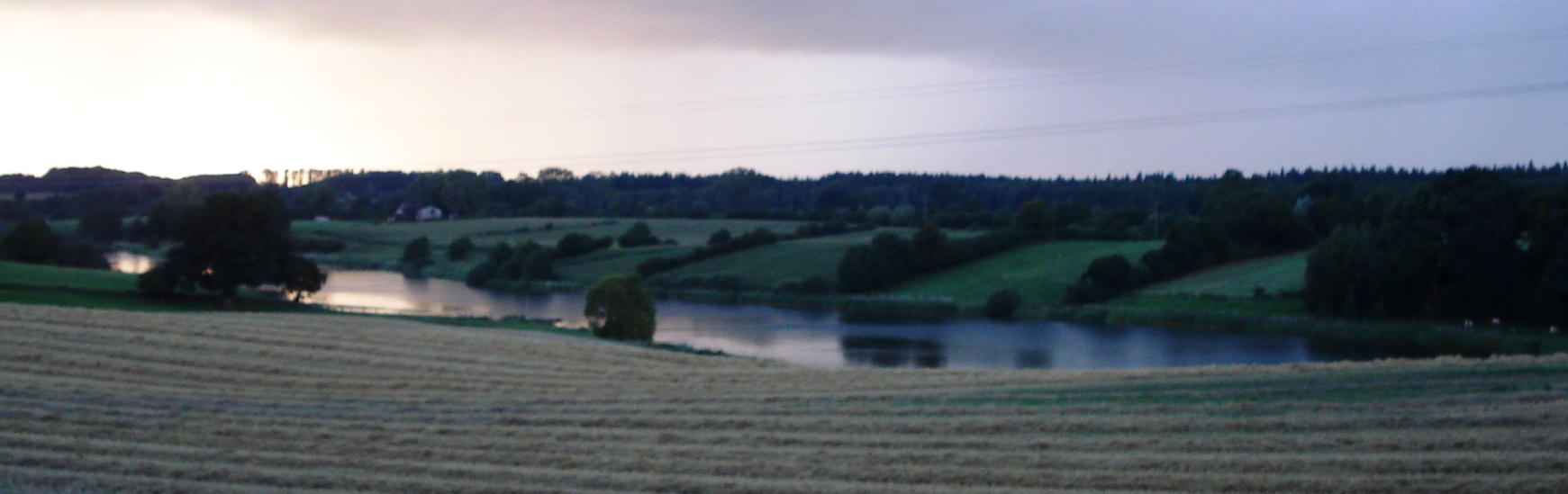

- Location within Schleswig-Holstein
- Location: Lehmkuhlen, Kreis Plön, Schleswig-Holstein
- Coordinates: 54.2025°N 10.355°E
- Primary outflows: Schwentine
- Basin countries: Germany
- Max. length: 0.8 km (0.50 mi)
- Max. width: 0.1 km (0.062 mi)
- Surface area: 0.107 km^{2} (0.041 sq mi)
- Max. depth: 2 m (6 ft 7 in)

Trenter See is a lake in Lehmkuhlen, Kreis Plön, Schleswig-Holstein, Germany. At an elevation of, its surface area is 0.107 km^{2}.
