= Rammsee =

Lake in Germany

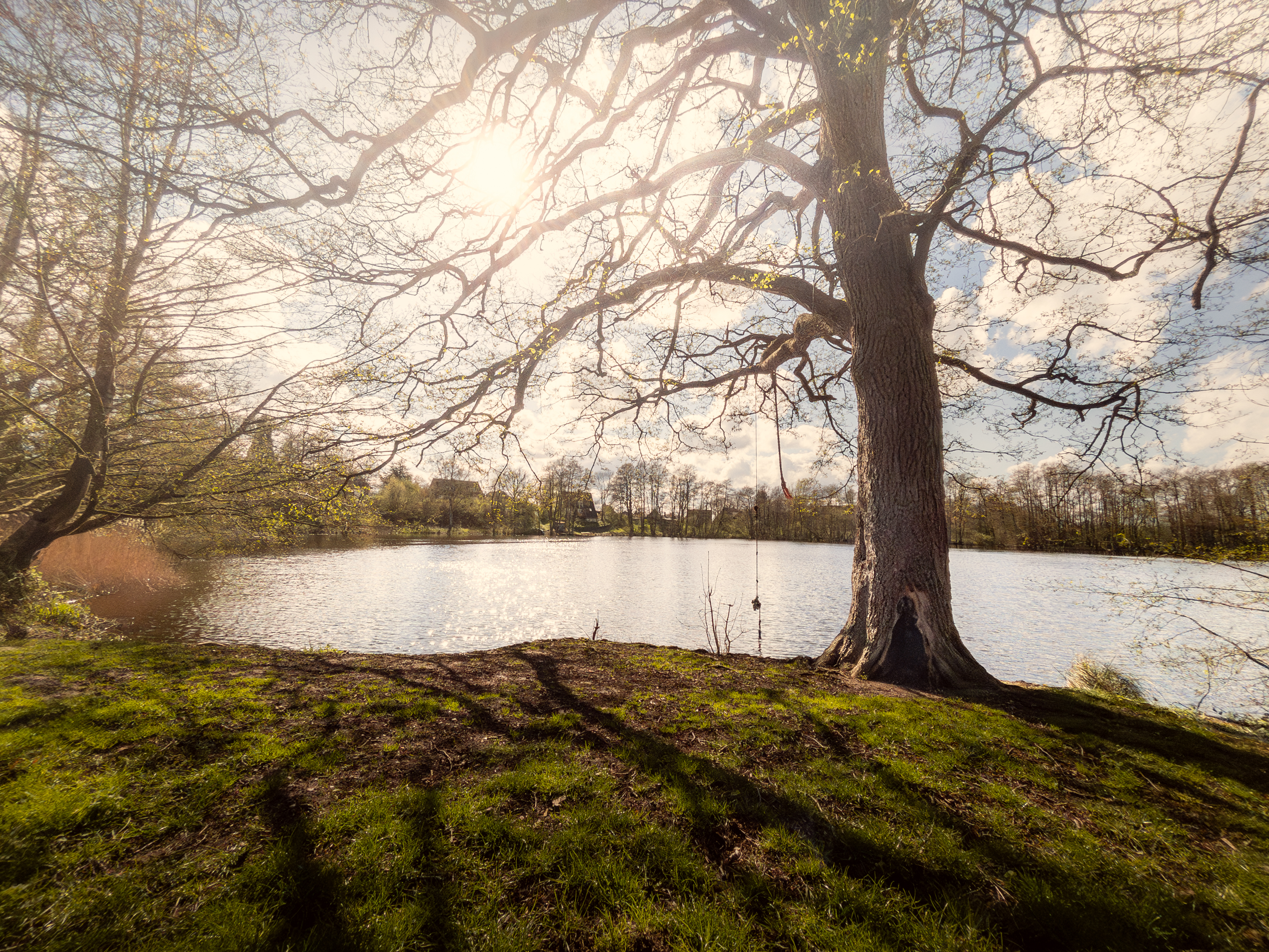

- Location within Schleswig-Holstein
- Location: Schleswig-Holstein
- Coordinates: 54°16′3.87″N 10°3′49.5″E
- Primary inflows: Rammsmoorgraben
- Basin countries: Germany
- Surface area: 3 ha (7.4 acres)
- Surface elevation: 21 m (69 ft)

Rammsee is a lake in Schleswig-Holstein, Germany, at an elevation of 21 m (69 ft) with a 3 ha (7.4-acre) surface area.

Rammsee was formed towards the end of the last ice age. It has a deflection to its shape and its located near to the Molfsee lake. The lake has swimming zones in its southern section.
