= Taschensee =

Lake in Germany

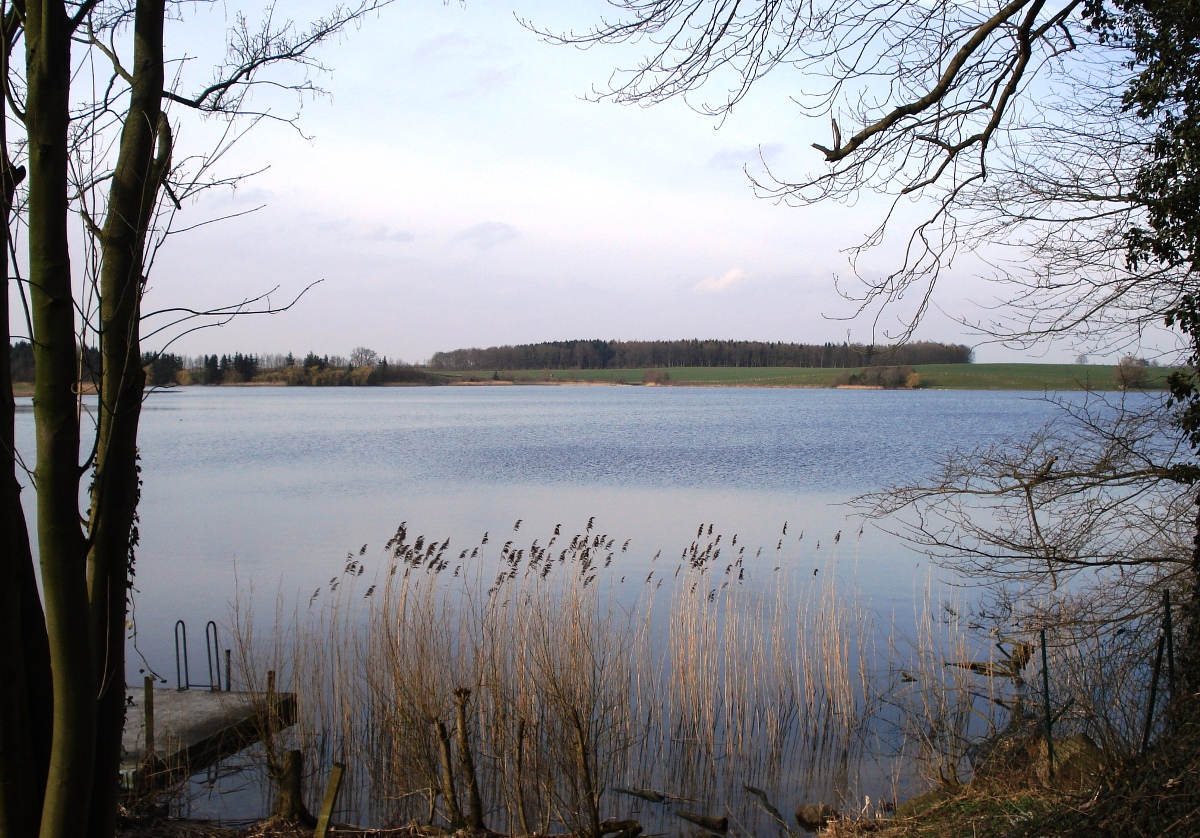

- Location within Schleswig-Holstein
- Location: Scharbeutz, Schleswig-Holstein
- Coordinates: 54°2′57″N 10°42′24″E
- Primary inflows: Gösebek
- Primary outflows: Gösebek
- Basin countries: Germany
- Surface area: 0.4 km^{2} (0.15 sq mi)
- Max. depth: 9.6 m (31 ft)
- Surface elevation: 22.18 m (72.8 ft)

Taschensee is a lake in Scharbeutz, Schleswig-Holstein, Germany. At an elevation of 22,18 m, its surface area is 0.4 km^{2}.
