= Drüsensee =

Lake in Lehmrade, Schleswig-Holstein, Germany

- Location within Schleswig-Holstein
- Location: Kreis Herzogtum Lauenburg, Schleswig-Holstein
- Coordinates: 53°35′26″N 10°43′0″E
- Primary inflows: Hellbach
- Primary outflows: Hellbach
- Basin countries: Germany
- Surface area: 73 ha (180 acres)
- Max. depth: 8 m (26 ft)
- Surface elevation: 14 m (46 ft)

Drüsensee is a lake in Kreis Herzogtum Lauenburg, Schleswig-Holstein, Germany. At an elevation of 14 m, its surface area is 73 ha.
