= Neustädter Binnenwasser =

Lake in Germany

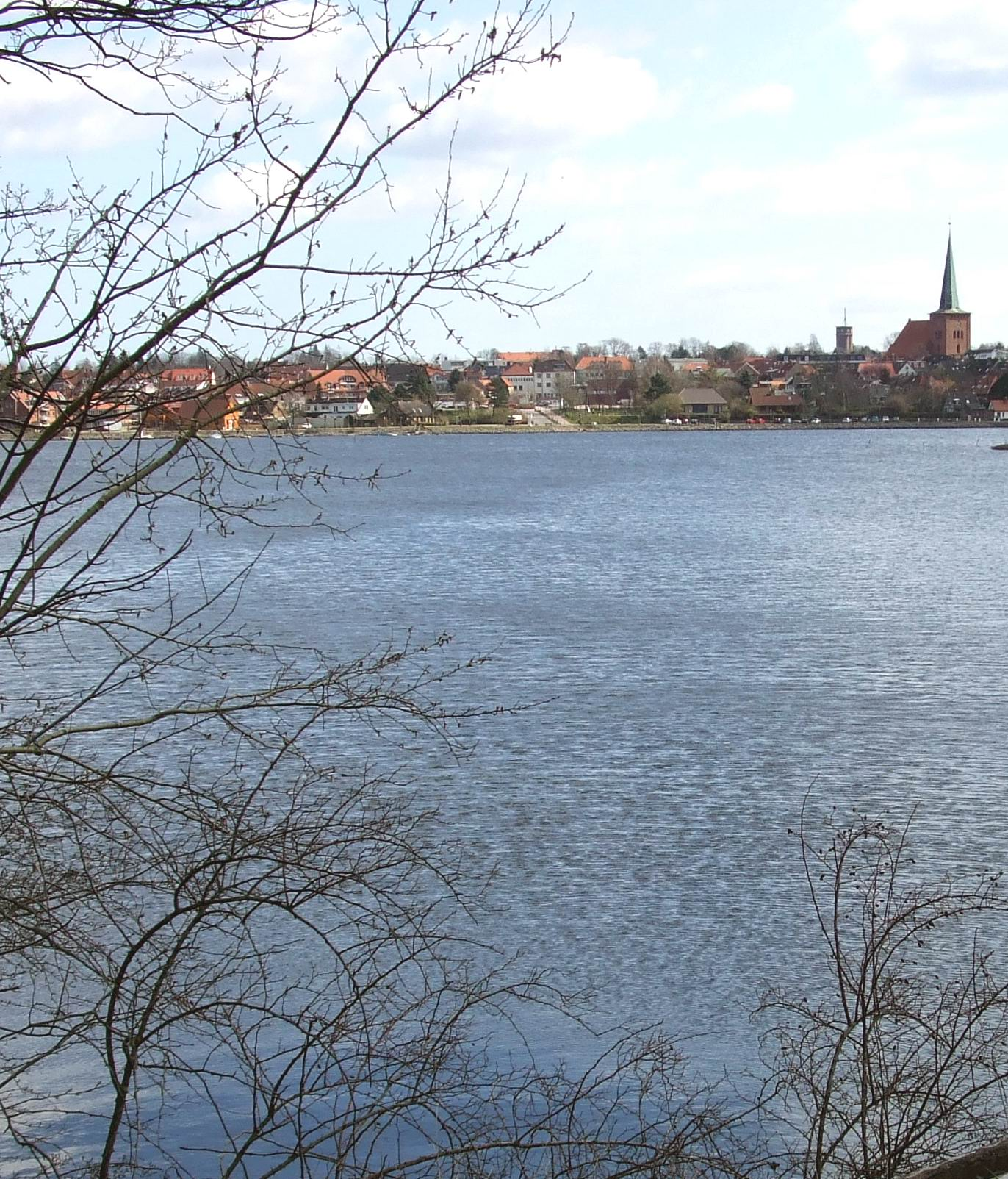

- Location within Schleswig-Holstein
- Location: Schleswig-Holstein
- Coordinates: 54.10692°N 10.80986°E
- Primary inflows: Kremper Au, Lachsau, Mühlenbach
- Basin countries: Germany
- Surface area: 1.44 km^{2} (0.56 sq mi)
- Average depth: 0.9 m (3.0 ft)
- Max. depth: 1.6 m (5.2 ft)
- Water volume: 1.35 km^{3} (0.32 cu mi)
- Settlements: Neustadt in Holstein

Neustädter Binnenwasser is a lake near Neustadt in Schleswig-Holstein, Germany.
