= Lanzer See =

Lake in Germany

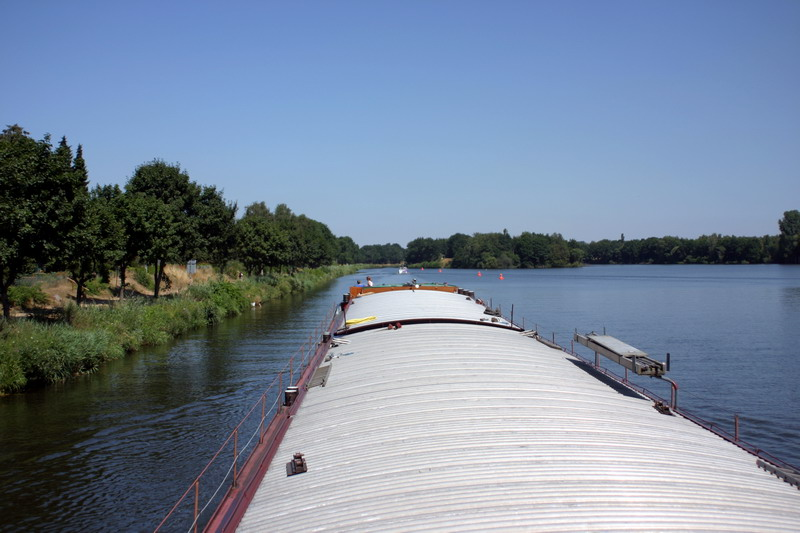
- Entrance to the Lanzer See, coming from Lauenburg.

- Location within Schleswig-Holstein
- Location: Kreis Herzogtum Lauenburg, Schleswig-Holstein
- Coordinates: 53°25′1.13″N 10°36′4.43″E
- Primary inflows: Elbe-Lübeck-Kanal
- Primary outflows: Elbe-Lübeck-Kanal
- Basin countries: Germany
- Surface area: 19.5 ha (48 acres)
- Average depth: 3.5 m (11 ft)
- Max. depth: 7 m (23 ft)
- Surface elevation: 8.55 m (28.1 ft)

Lanzer See is a lake in Kreis Herzogtum Lauenburg, Schleswig-Holstein, Germany. At an elevation of 8,55 m, its surface area is 19.5 ha.
