= Großer Benzer See =

Lake in Malente, Schleswig-Holstein, Germany

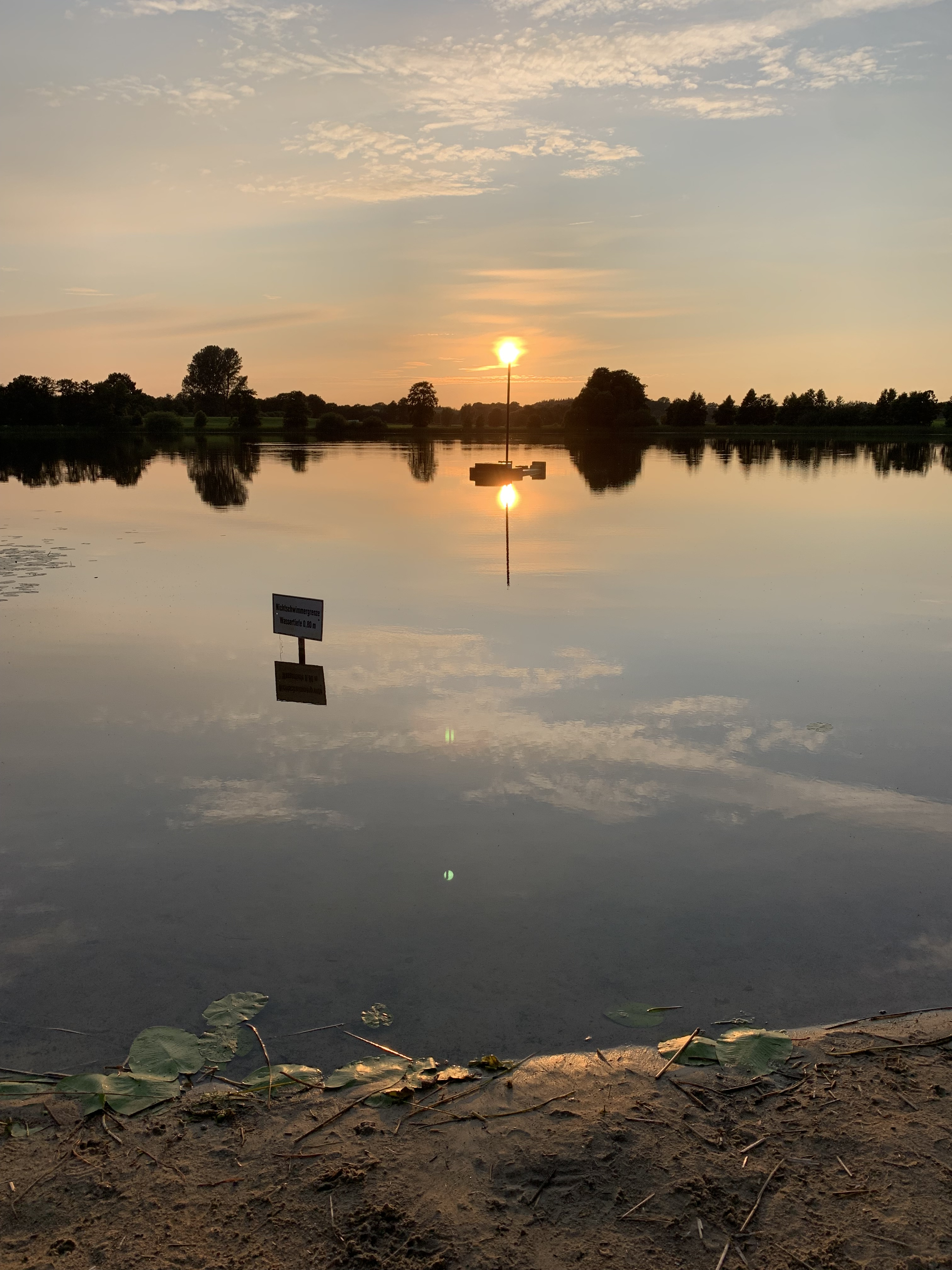

- Location within Schleswig-Holstein
- Location: Malente, Holsteinische Schweiz, Schleswig-Holstein
- Coordinates: 54.2001°N 10.6167°E
- Basin countries: Germany
- Max. length: 0.6 km (0.37 mi)
- Max. width: 0.4 km (0.25 mi)
- Surface area: 0.13 km^{2} (0.050 sq mi)
- Max. depth: 15.8 m (52 ft)

Großer Benzer See is a lake in Malente, Holsteinische Schweiz, Schleswig-Holstein, Germany. At an elevation of ???, its surface area is 0.13 km².
