= Wellsee =

Lake in Germany

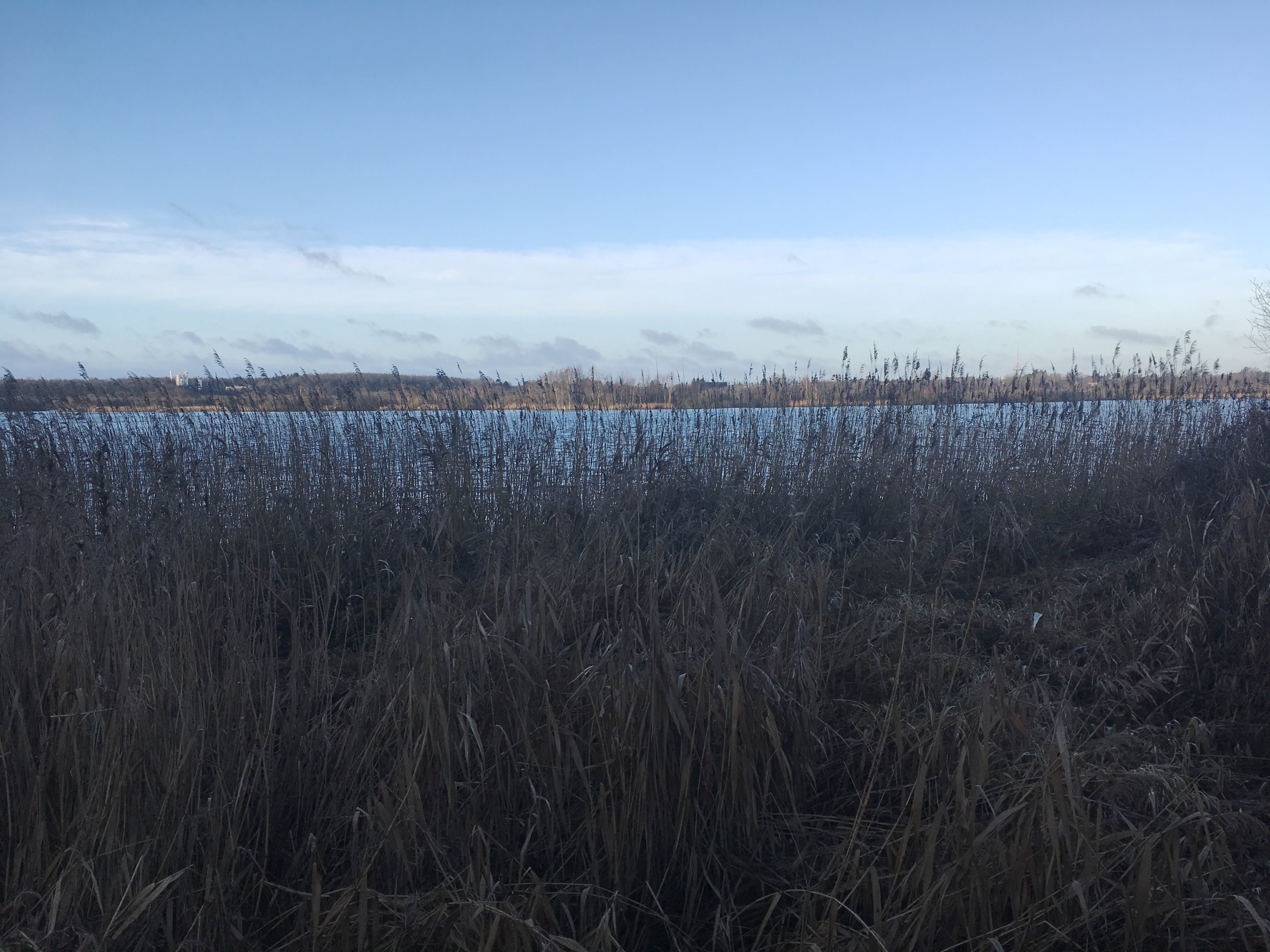

- Location within Schleswig-Holstein
- Location: Schleswig-Holstein
- Coordinates: 54°16′50″N 10°11′02″E
- Primary inflows: Schlüsbek
- Primary outflows: Wellsau
- Basin countries: Germany
- Max. length: 0.8 km (0.50 mi)
- Max. width: 0.8 km (0.50 mi)
- Surface area: 0.25 km^{2} (0.097 sq mi)
- Shore length^{1}: 3.3 km (2.1 mi)
- Surface elevation: 29 m (95 ft)
- ^{1} Shore length is not a well-defined measure.

Wellsee is a lake in Schleswig-Holstein, Germany. At an elevation of 29 m, its surface area is 25 ha.
