= Middelburger See =

Lake in Germany

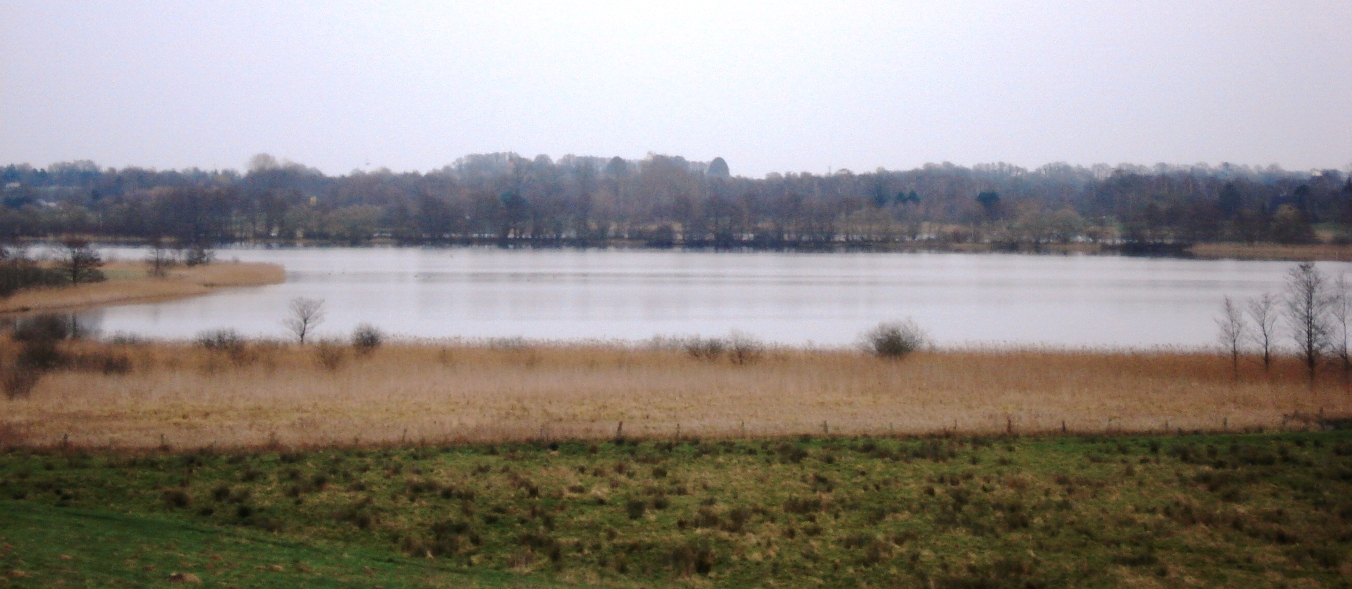

- Location within Schleswig-Holstein
- Location: Süsel, Kreis Ostholstein, Schleswig-Holstein
- Coordinates: 54.078376°N 10.683002°E
- Basin countries: Germany
- Surface area: 0.26 km^{2} (0.10 sq mi)
- Max. depth: 4.6 m (15 ft)

Middelburger See is a lake in Süsel, Kreis Ostholstein, Schleswig-Holstein, Germany. At an elevation of 21.9 metres (72 ft), its surface area is 0.26 km^{2} (0.10 sq mi).
