= Windebyer Noor =

Lake in Germany

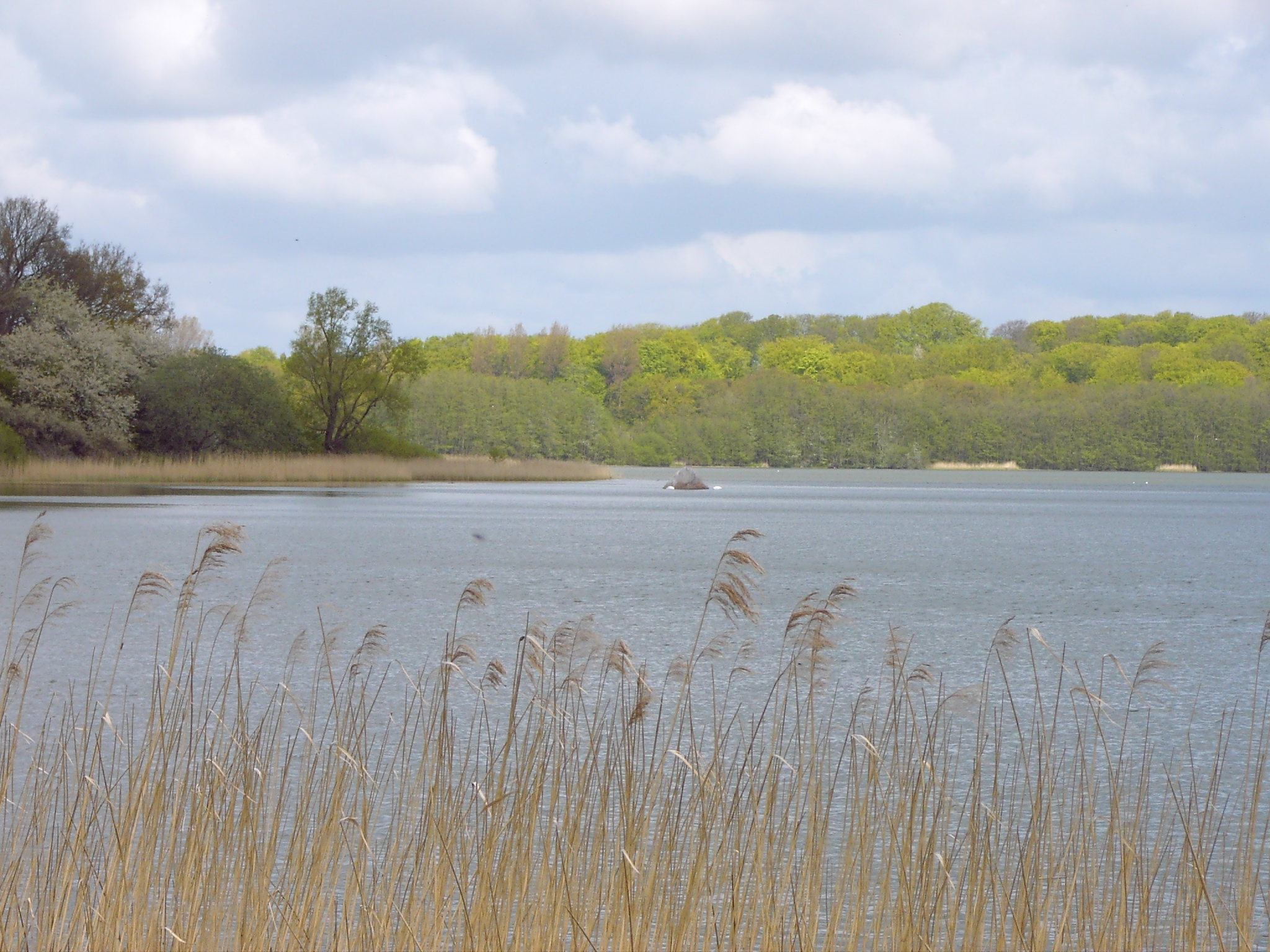

- Location within Schleswig-Holstein
- Location: Kreis Rendsburg-Eckernförde, Schleswig-Holstein
- Coordinates: 54°28′30″N 9°48′23″E
- Catchment area: 16.61 km^{2} (6.41 sq mi)
- Basin countries: Germany
- Max. length: 3.4 km (2.1 mi)
- Max. width: 1.9 m (6 ft 3 in)
- Surface area: 389.3 ha (962 acres)
- Average depth: 6.4 m (21 ft)
- Max. depth: 14 m (46 ft)
- Water volume: 25,000,000 m^{3} (880,000,000 cu ft)
- Shore length^{1}: 10 km (6.2 mi)
- Surface elevation: 0 m (0 ft)
- Settlements: Eckernförde
- ^{1} Shore length is not a well-defined measure.

Windebyer Noor (Danish: Vindeby Nor) is a lake in Kreis Rendsburg-Eckernförde, Schleswig-Holstein, Germany. At an elevation of 0 m, its surface area is 389.3 ha. The lake belongs to Eckernförde.
