= Tröndelsee =

Lake in Kiel, Schleswig-Holstein, Germany

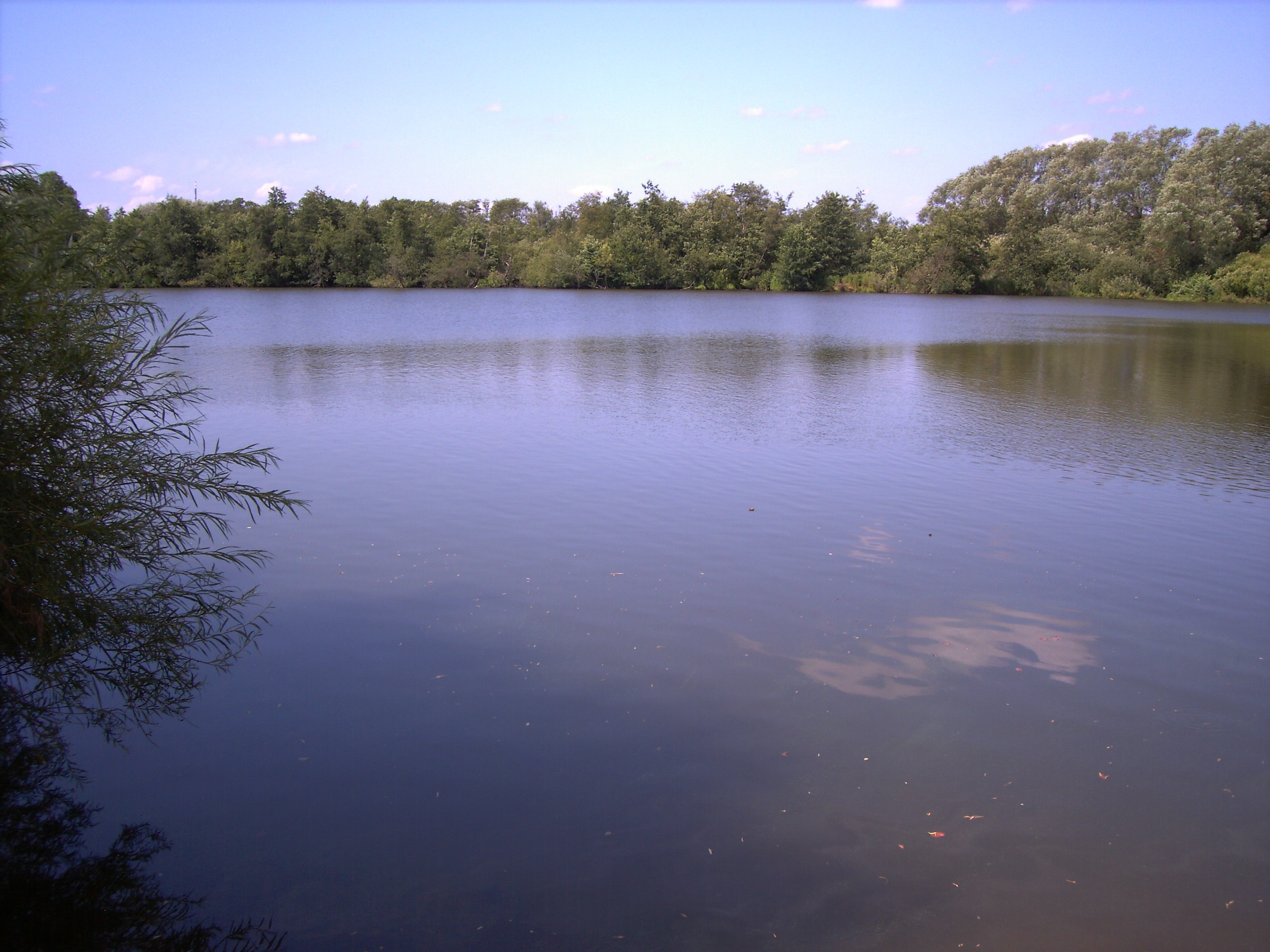
- Kiel, Tröndelsee

- Location within Schleswig-Holstein
- Location: Kiel, Schleswig-Holstein
- Coordinates: 54°18′18″N 10°10′21″E
- Primary outflows: Tröndelbach
- Basin countries: Germany
- Surface area: 24 ha (59 acres)
- Surface elevation: 30 m (98 ft)
- Settlements: Kiel

Tröndelsee is a lake in Kiel, Schleswig-Holstein, Germany. At an elevation of 30 m, its surface area is 24 ha.
