= Scharbeutz =

- Municipality
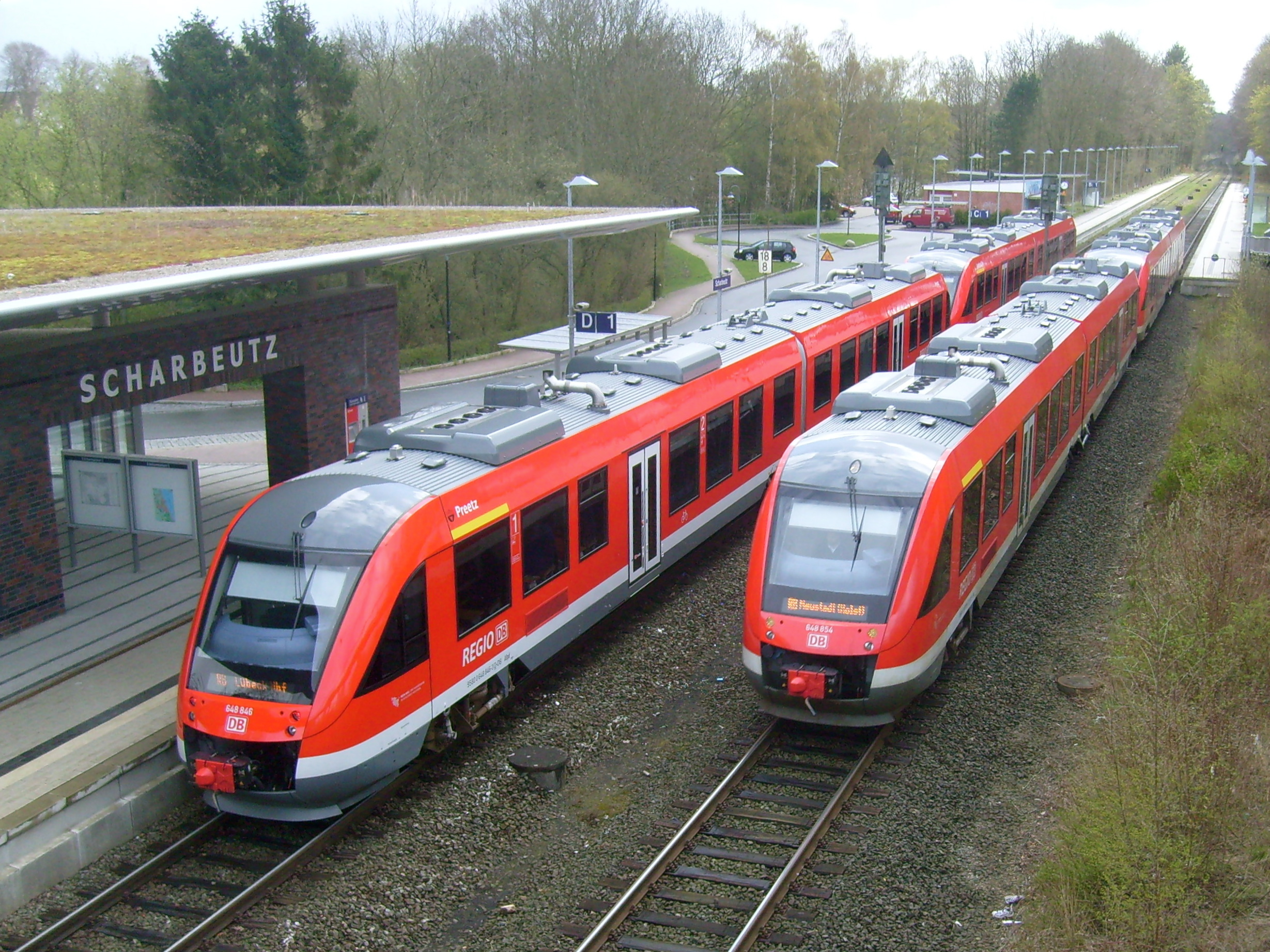
- Scharbeutz train station

- Flag Coat of arms

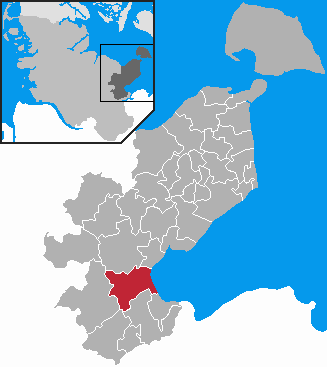
- Location of Scharbeutz within Ostholstein district
- Interactive map of Scharbeutz
- Location within Germany Location within Schleswig-Holstein
- Coordinates: 54°01′17″N 10°44′44″E
- Country: Germany
- State: Schleswig-Holstein
- District: Ostholstein
- Subdivisions: 10

Government
  - Mayor: Volker Owerien

Area
  - Total: 51.78 km^{2} (19.99 sq mi)
- Elevation: 12 m (39 ft)

Population (2025-12-31)
  - Total: 11,668
  - Density: 225.3/km^{2} (583.6/sq mi)
- Time zone: UTC+01:00 (CET)
  - Summer (DST): UTC+02:00 (CEST)
- Postal codes: 23629, 23683, 23684
- Dialling codes: 04503, 04524, 04563
- Vehicle registration: OH
- Website: www.gemeinde-scharbeutz.de

Scharbeutz (German pronunciation: [ʃaʁˈbɔɪ̯t͡s], Polabian Scorbuze) is a municipality in the district of Ostholstein, in Schleswig-Holstein, Germany. It is situated on the Bay of Lübeck (Baltic Sea), approx. 20 km north of Lübeck, and 15 km southeast of Eutin.

== See also ==
- Taschensee
