= Bösdorf, Schleswig-Holstein =

Bösdorf
- Municipality
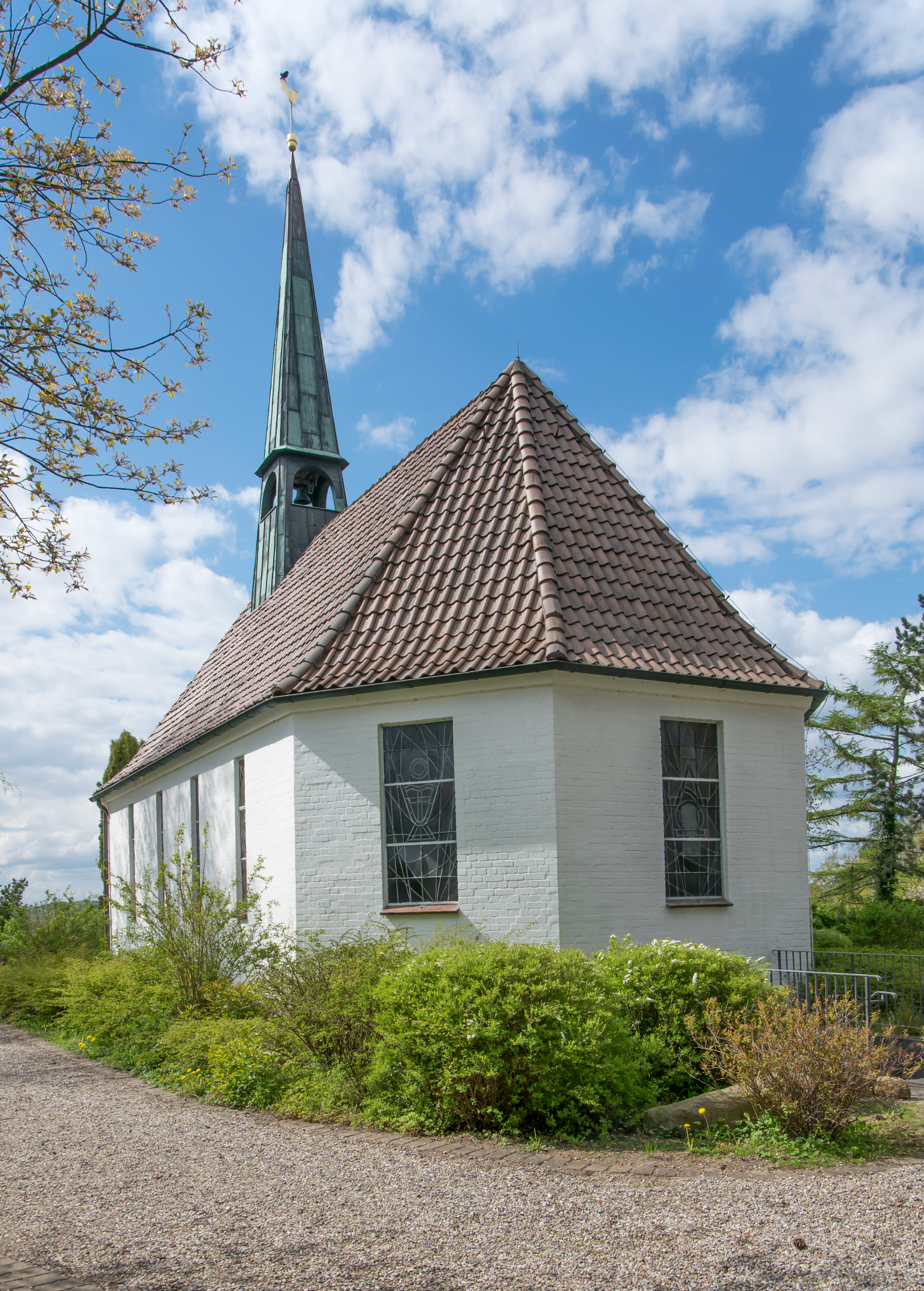

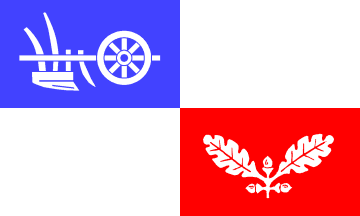
- Flag Coat of arms

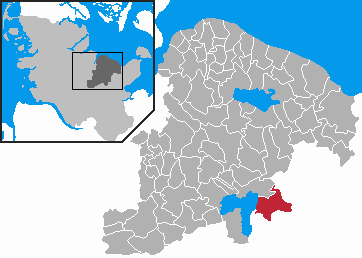
- Location of Bösdorf within Plön district
- Interactive map of Bösdorf
- Location within Germany Location within Schleswig-Holstein
- Coordinates: 54°08′N 10°28′E
- Country: Germany
- State: Schleswig-Holstein
- District: Plön

Government
  - Mayor: Georg Biss (CDU)

Area
  - Total: 21.1 km^{2} (8.1 sq mi)
- Elevation: 49 m (161 ft)

Population (2025-12-31)
  - Total: 1,255
  - Density: 59.5/km^{2} (154/sq mi)
- Time zone: UTC+01:00 (CET)
  - Summer (DST): UTC+02:00 (CEST)
- Postal codes: 24306
- Dialling codes: 04522
- Vehicle registration: PLÖ
- Website: www.boesdorf-holstein.de

Bösdorf is a municipality in the district of Plön, in Schleswig-Holstein, Germany.

== Geography ==
Bösdorf is located between Lake Plön in the west and the Dieksee in the north. It is centered on nature park Holstein Switzerland, an important tourist destination in Northern Germany between the cities of Kiel and Lübeck.

=== Settlements ===
The municipality consists of the villages Bösdorf, Börnsdorf, Kleinmeinsdorf, Niederkleveez, Oberkleveez, Pfingstberg, Sandkaten and the small settlements Dodau, Kleinmühlen, Schneckenfeld, Stoßheck, Ruhleben, (partially) Waldshagen, Augstfelde, Friedrichshof, Hohenrade, Karlshof, Trollholm and Steinbusch.

== Politics ==
=== Municipal council (German: Gemeindevertretung) ===
Results of the Municipal election 2023:

Party	Votes	%	Seats	+/–
Christian Democratic Union	1,693	47.52	6	−1
Social Democratic Party	738	20.71	3	−1
Bürger für Bösdorf	1,132	31.77	4	–1
Total	3,563	100.00	13	–3
Valid votes	3,563	99.44		
Invalid/blank votes	20	0.56		
Total votes	3,583	100.00		

=== Mayor (German: Bürgermeister) ===
Georg Biss (CDU) is mayor since 15 June 2023. He shall be the superior of the employees of municipality. As voluntary (ehrenamtlich) mayor of an independent (amtsfrei) municipality, he serves as the head of administration (§ 50 GO para. 5). First deputy mayor is Regina Hornsmann (BfB), second deputy mayor is Ralf Loose (SPD).

=== List of mayors ===
- Heinrich Stender (1945–1946)
- Fritz Dose (1946–1949)
- Wilhelm Schmidt (1949–1962)
- Paul Vorbeck (1962–1974)
- Bruno Schöning (1974–1983)
- Peter Appel (1983–1990)
- Karl-Heinz Schönberg (1990–1994)
- Joachim Schmidt (1994–2018)
- Engelbert Unterhalt (2018–2023)
- Georg Biss (since 2023)

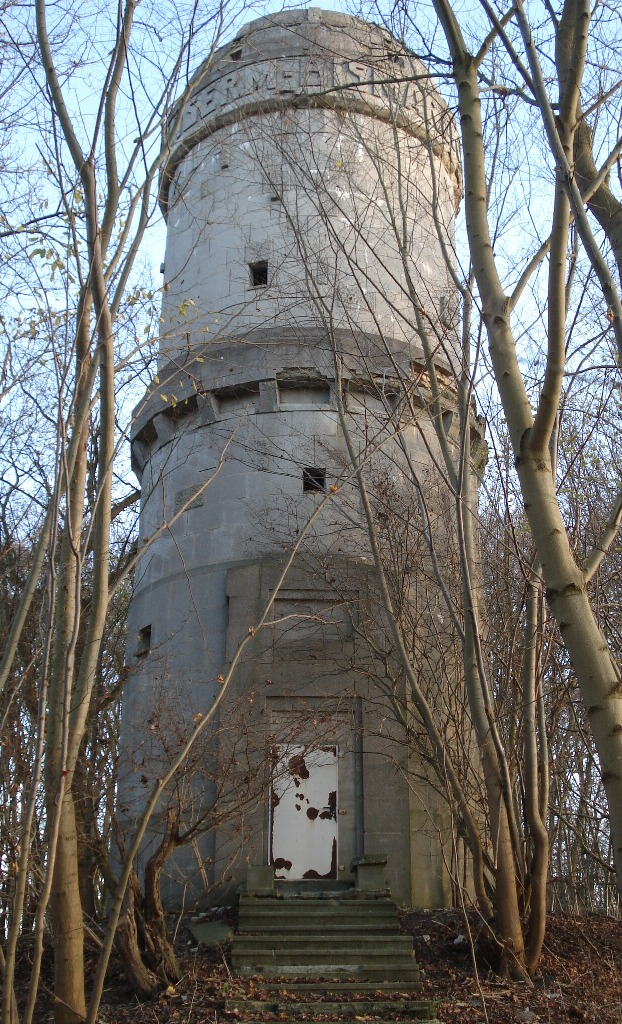
Bismarcksäule (Waldshagen)

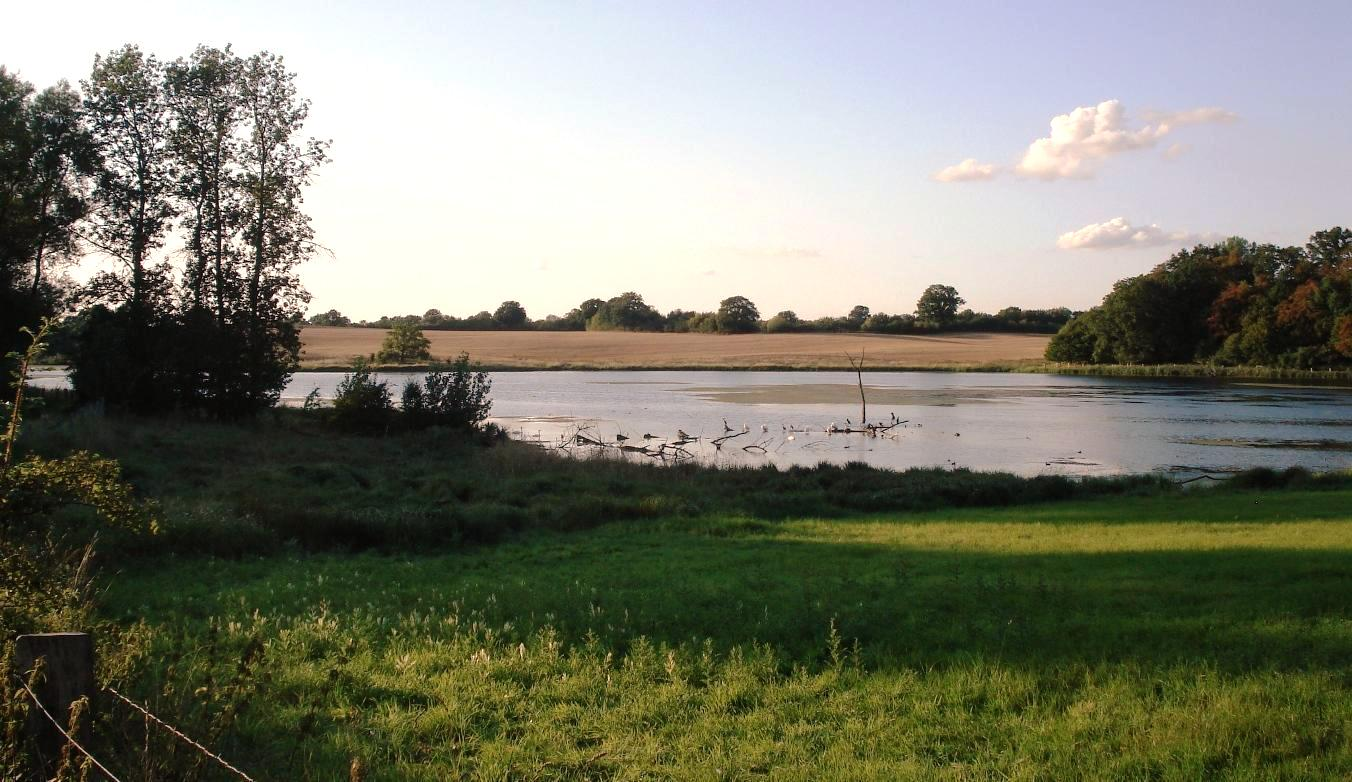

== Notable people ==
- John Adolphus, Duke of Schleswig-Holstein-Sonderburg-Plön (1634–1704), Imperial field marshall, died in Ruhleben
- Ulf Kämpfer (*1972), German politician (SPD), grew up in Niederkleveez
