= Bothkamper See =

Lake in Kreis Plön, Germany

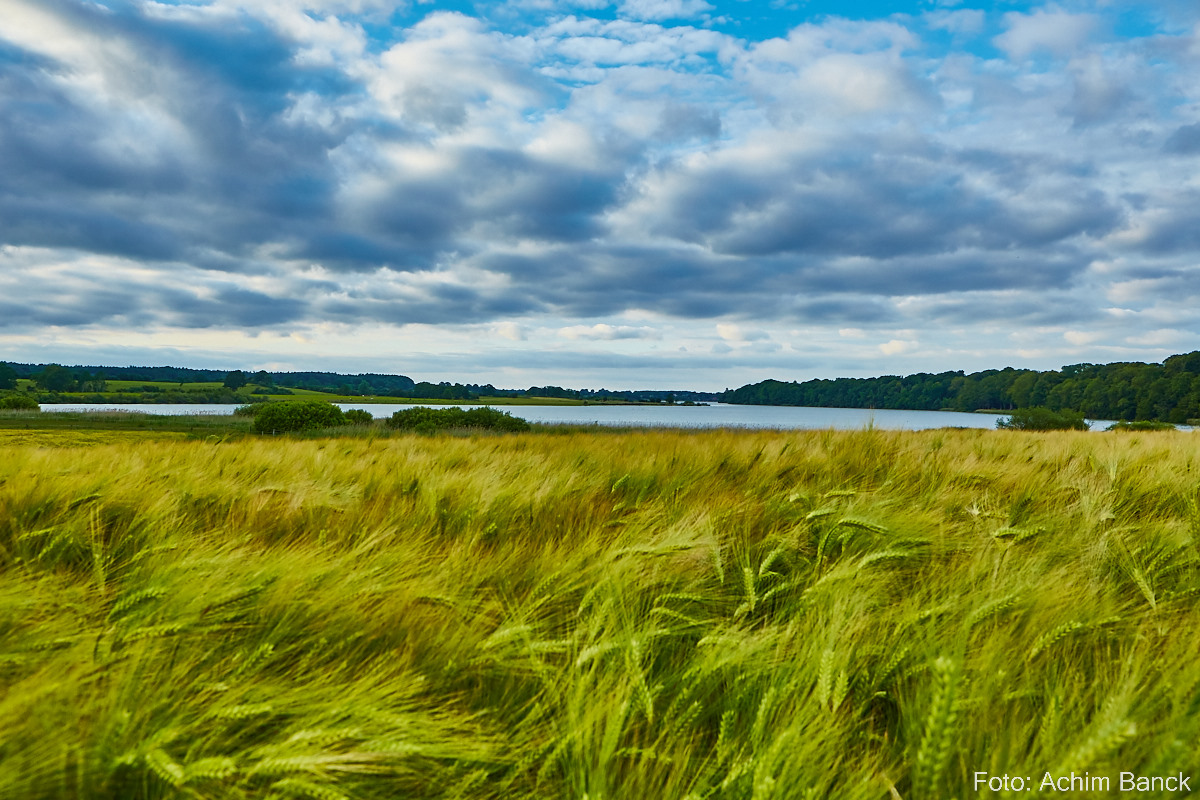

- Location within Schleswig-Holstein
- Location: Schleswig-Holstein
- Coordinates: 54°12′18″N 10°07′44″E
- Primary inflows: Droege Eider
- Primary outflows: Eider
- Basin countries: Germany

Bothkamper See is a lake in the municipality of Bothkamp in Schleswig-Holstein, Germany. The water quality in the bathing area in the village of Kirchbarkau is usually rated "good" or "very good", except in the summer when algae bloom.
