= Garrensee =

Lake in Herzogtum Lauenburg, Schleswig-Holstein, Germany

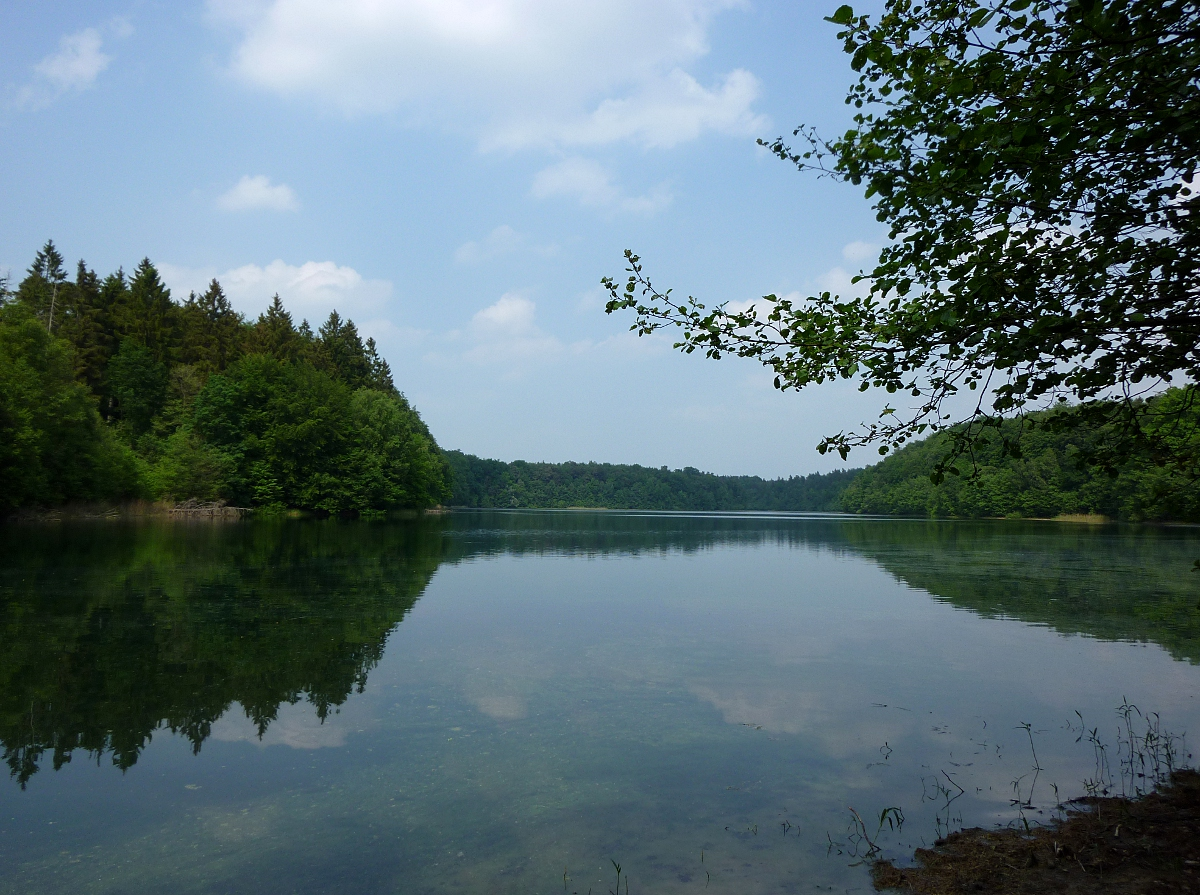
- Lake Garrensee in the NSG Salem Moor with adjacent forests and lakes and in the Lauenburgische Seen Nature Park

- Location within Schleswig-Holstein
- Location: Kreis Herzogtum Lauenburg, Schleswig-Holstein
- Coordinates: 53°41′15″N 10°51′4″E
- Primary outflows: none
- Basin countries: Germany

Garrensee is a lake in Ziethen, Kreis Herzogtum Lauenburg, Schleswig-Holstein, Germany.
