= Großer Binnensee =

Lake in Plön District, Schleswig-Holstein, Germany

- Location within Schleswig-Holstein
- Location: Kreis Plön, Schleswig-Holstein
- Coordinates: 54°19′29″N 10°37′39″E
- Primary inflows: Kossau
- Basin countries: Germany
- Surface area: 4.8 km^{2} (1.9 sq mi)

Großer Binnensee is a lake in Kreis Plön, Schleswig-Holstein, Germany. Its surface area is 4.8 km^{2}.
