= Dieksee =

Lake in Holstein Switzerland, North Germany

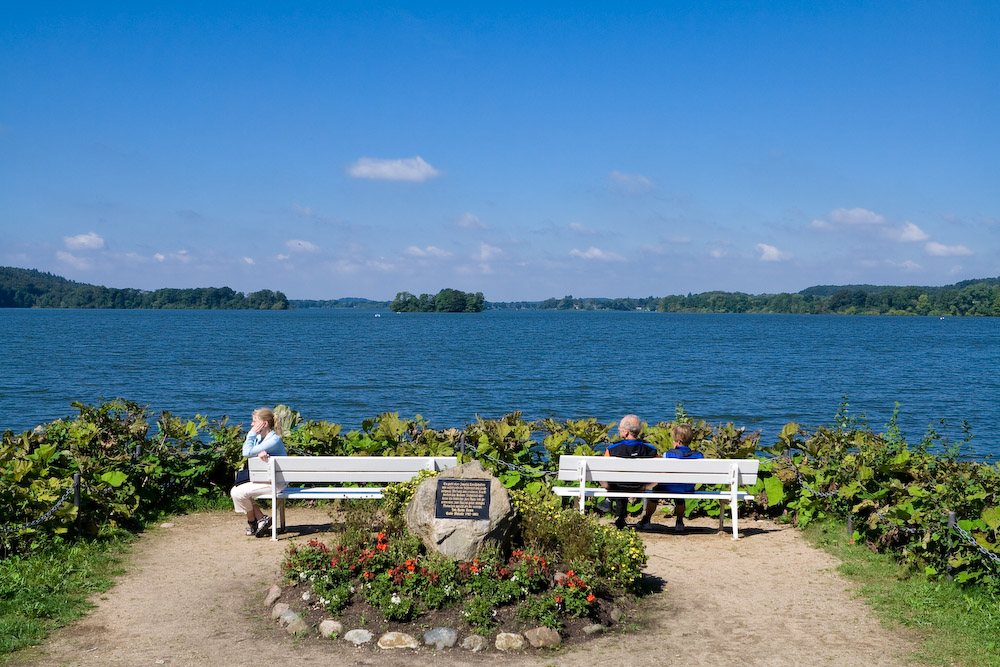

- Location within Schleswig-Holstein
- Location: Holstein Switzerland, Schleswig-Holstein, Germany
- Coordinates: 54°09′58″N 10°31′15″E
- Primary inflows: Schwentine
- Primary outflows: Schwentine
- Basin countries: Germany
- Surface area: 386 ha (950 acres)
- Max. depth: 38 m (125 ft)
- Surface elevation: 22 m (72 ft)

The Dieksee is a lake in the Holstein Switzerland region of North Germany.

== Geography ==
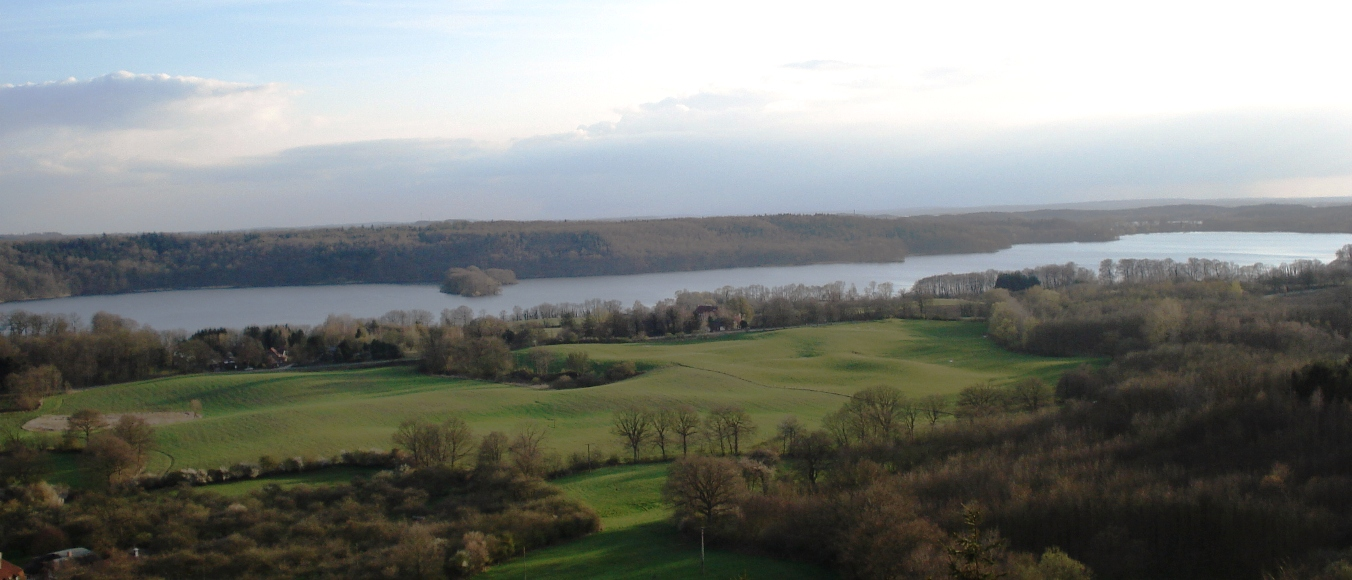
The Dieksee from the Holzberg Tower

It has an area of 386 hectares (950 acres), a maximum length of about 3.4 kilometres and a maximum width of 1.6 kilometres. The lake is up to 38 metres deep, its surface elevation is about 22 m above sea level (NN) and it is crossed by the River Schwentine from east to west. This waterway links the Dieksee to the other lakes in the Holstein Lake District (the Kleiner- and Großer Eutiner See, the Kellersee, the Großen- and Kleinen Plöner See and the Ukleisee).

Like the rest of Holstein Switzerland, the Dieksee was formed during the last ice age. Dead ice was preserved in the hollow thus formed; when that melted the lake was formed.

== Recreation ==
Boats may use the lake and pleasure boats (run by 5-Seen-Fahrt) link the largest villages of the Holstein lake district. In the villages of Malente-Gremsmühlen, Niederkleveez and Timmdorf there are jetties on the Dieksee. There is a circular walk and cycle path around lake which is about 14 kilometres long. From the Holzberg Tower there is a good overview of the Dieksee, the lake's islands of Langenwarder and Gremswarder and the other lakes in the region.

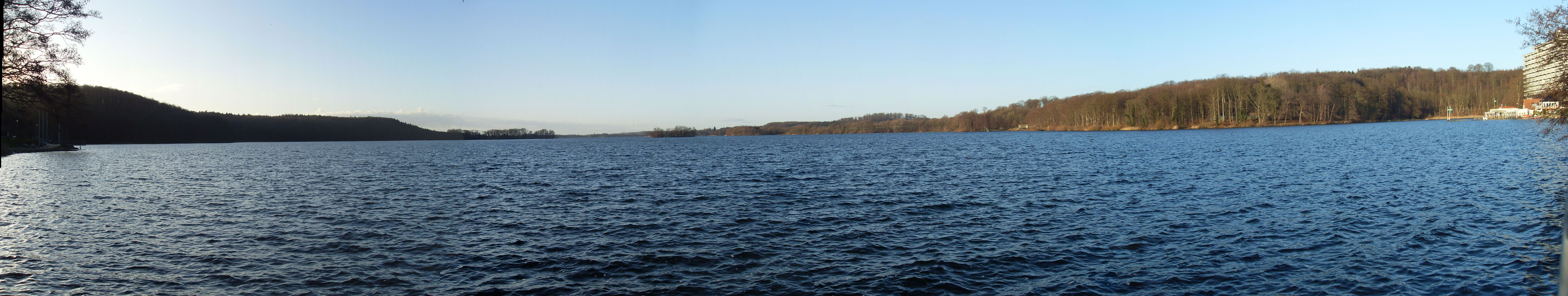
Panorama of the Dieksee from the Dieksee promenade in Malente-Gremsmühlen (Dec 2009)

== See also ==
- List of lakes in Schleswig-Holstein
