= Kronsee =

Lake in Plön District, Schleswig-Holstein, Germany

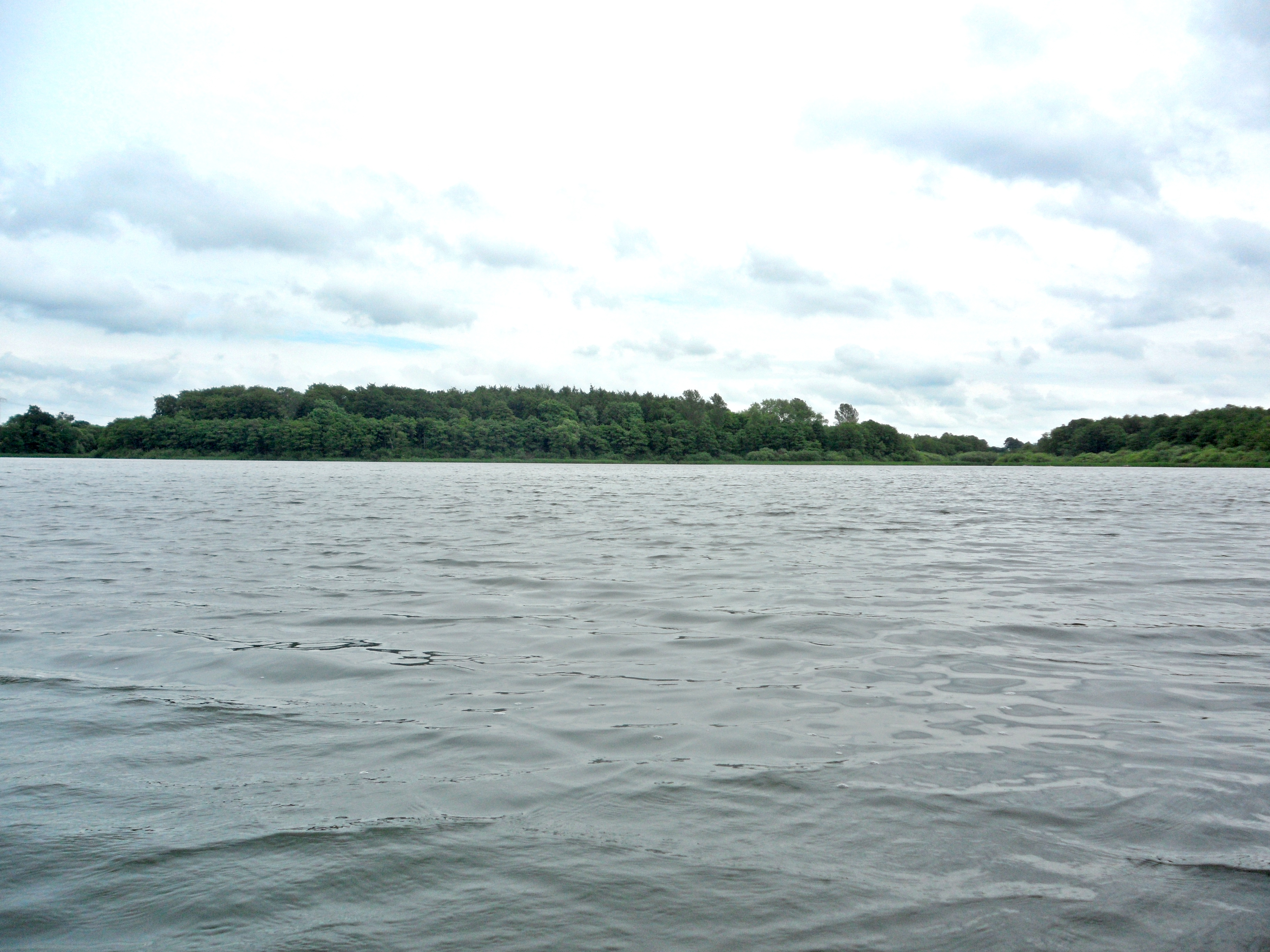
- The Kronsee close to the north shore

- Location within Schleswig-Holstein
- Location: Plön district, Schleswig-Holstein, Germany
- Coordinates: 54°10′57″N 10°19′2″E
- Primary inflows: Schwentine
- Primary outflows: Schwentine
- Basin countries: Germany
- Surface area: 0.23 km^{2} (0.089 sq mi)
- Max. depth: 8 m (26 ft)
- Surface elevation: 20 m (66 ft)
- Settlements: Nearby: Plön, Preetz

The Kronsee is a lake in the Holstein Switzerland region of North Germany. It lies on the River Schwentine between the Kleiner Plöner See, upstream, and the Fuhlensee, downstream, south of Wahlstorf Manor House.

It has an area of 23 hectares (57 acres), is up to 8 metres deep and lies about 20 m above sea level (NN).
