= Langensee (Holstein) =

Lake in Schleswig-Holstein, Germany

- Location within Schleswig-Holstein
- Location: Schleswig-Holstein, Germany
- Coordinates: 54°9′46″N 10°29′2″E
- Primary inflows: Schwentine from the Dieksee
- Primary outflows: Schwentine to the Behler See
- Surface area: 33 ha (82 acres)
- Max. depth: 8 m (26 ft)
- Surface elevation: 22 m (72 ft)
- Settlements: Plön

The Langensee is a lake in the North German lakeland region of Holstein Switzerland. It lies on the River Schwentine between the lakes of Dieksee (upstream) and Behler See (downstream). It covers an area of 33 hectares (82 acres), is up to 8 metres deep and lies at a height of 22 m above sea level (NN).
