= Behler See =

Lake in Germany

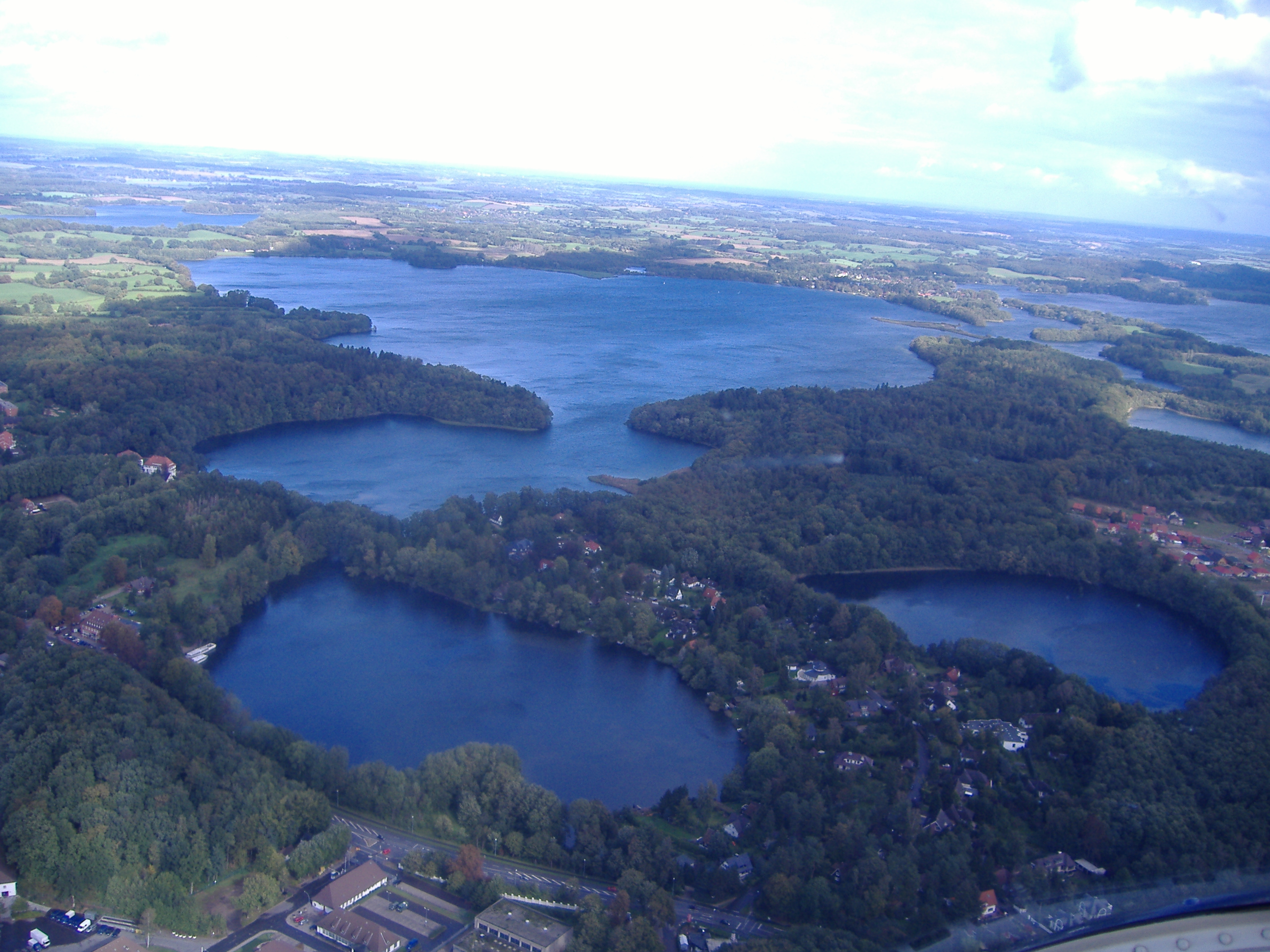
- Lake Edebergsee, Höftsee and Behler See at Plön

- Location within Schleswig-Holstein
- Location: Holstein Switzerland, Plön and Ostholstein districts, Schleswig-Holstein, Germany
- Coordinates: 54°9′53″N 10°28′10″E
- Primary inflows: Schwentine
- Primary outflows: Schwentine
- Basin countries: Germany
- Surface area: 2.77 km^{2} (1.07 sq mi)
- Max. depth: 43 m (141 ft)
- Surface elevation: 22 m (72 ft)
- Settlements: Grebin-Behl, Malente-Timmdorf. Nearby: Plön

The Behler See is a lake in the Holstein Switzerland region of North Germany. It lies between Timmdorf (municipality of Malente) to the east and the town of Plön to the west. To the east it transitions into the Langensee, to the west into the Höftsee.

All these lakes are crossed from east to west by the River Schwentine. The Behler See is named after the village of Behl in the municipality of Grebin, which lies to the north.

It has an area of 277 hectares (680 acres), is up to 43 metres deep and its surface elevation is about 22 m above sea level (NN).

== See also ==
- List of lakes in Schleswig-Holstein
