= Höftsee =

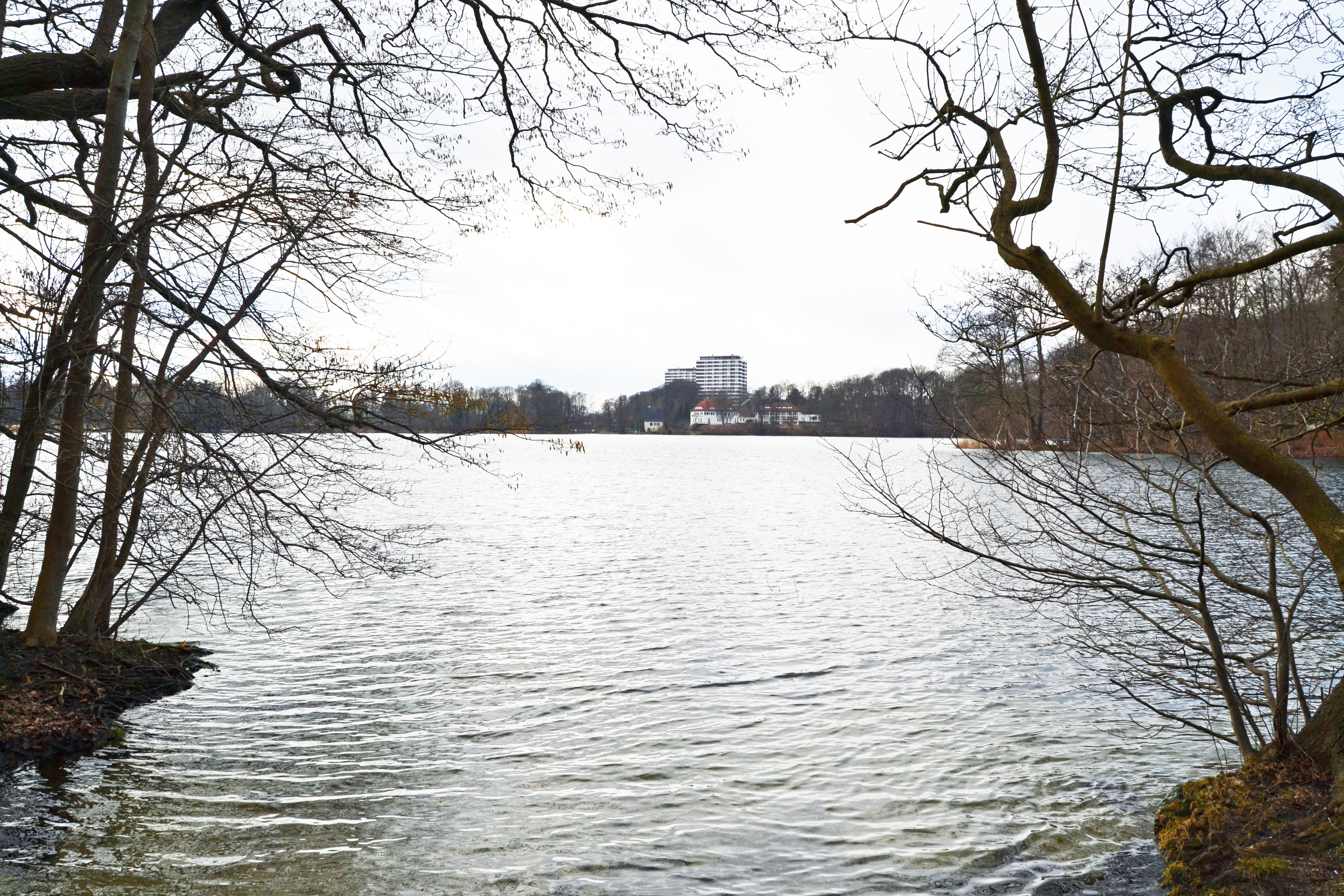
- Plön, Höftsee towards the oil mill

- Location within Schleswig-Holstein
- Location: Kreis Plön, Schleswig-Holstein
- Coordinates: 54°9′23″N 10°27′23″E
- Basin countries: Germany
- Surface area: 18 ha (44 acres)
- Max. depth: 16 m (52 ft)
- Surface elevation: 22 m (72 ft)
- Settlements: Plön

The Höftsee is a lake in the Holstein Switzerland in North Germany. It lies on the River Schwentine east of the town of Plön between the Behler See and the Großer Plöner See. It has an area of about 18 hectares (44 acres), is up to 16 metres deep and lies about 22 m above sea level (NN).

There is a watermill on the Höftsee that makes use of the drop between the Höftsee and the Großer Plöner See. The associated weir is impassable to boats. There is however a boat slide that considerably eases the transportation of boats over land.
