= Kirchsee (Schleswig-Holstein) =

Lake in Preetz, Germany

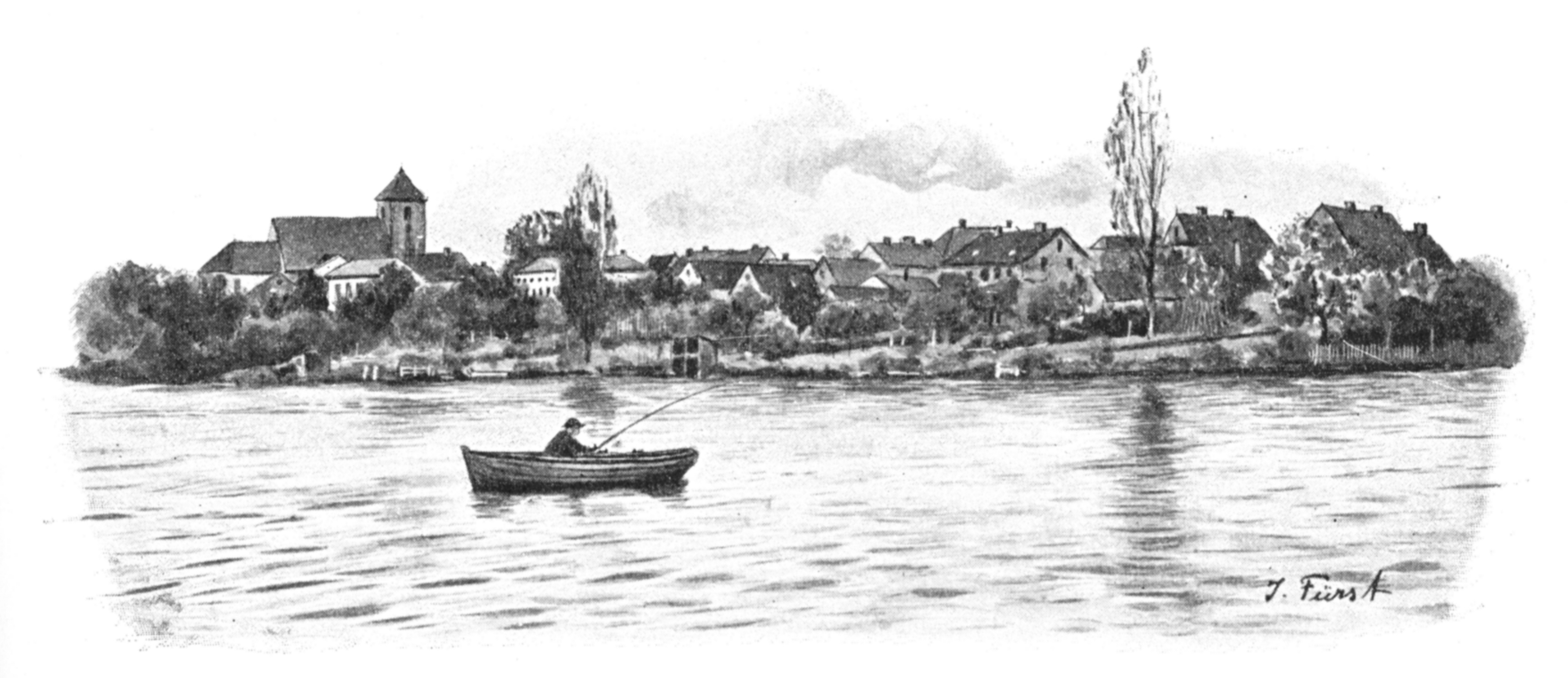
- Kirchsee around 1895, Preetz in the background

- Location within Schleswig-Holstein
- Location: Kreis Plön, Schleswig-Holstein
- Coordinates: 54°13′52″N 10°17′5″E
- Primary inflows: Schwentine
- Primary outflows: Schwentine
- Basin countries: Germany
- Surface area: 0.1 km^{2} (0.039 sq mi)
- Max. depth: 6 m (20 ft)
- Surface elevation: 20 m (66 ft)
- Settlements: Preetz

The Kirchsee is a lake in Plön district in the north German state of Schleswig-Holstein, in a region known as "Holstein Switzerland".

The Kirchsee is the lake in the town centre of Preetz. The original settlement of Preetz is situated on its western shore. This is also the location of Preetz's town church, after which the lake is named. The Kirchsee is crossed by the River Schwentine, which flows from the south, from the Lanker See. The lake has an area of 10 hectares (25 acres), is up to 6 metres deep and lies at an elevation of about 20 m above sea level (NN). Today the lake is nearly surrounded by built-up areas.
