= Rosensee =

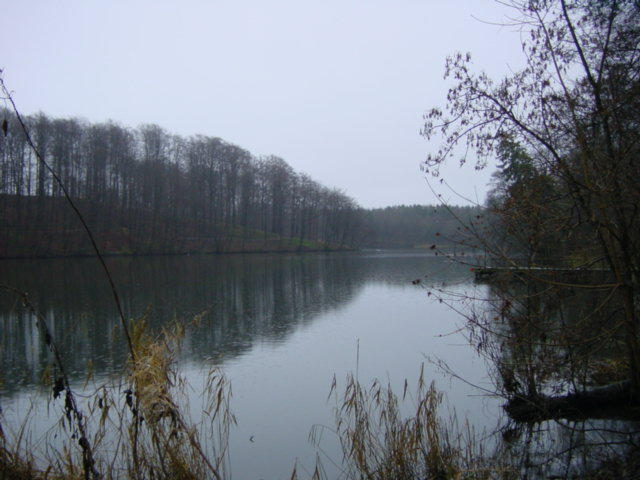
- The Rosensee

- Location within Schleswig-Holstein
- Location: Schleswig-Holstein
- Coordinates: 54°17′08″N 10°15′23″E
- Basin countries: Germany
- Settlements: Rastorf. Nearby: Schwentinental

The Rosensee is a lake in the region of Holstein Switzerland in the state of Schleswig-Holstein, Germany.

== History ==
The lake began as a reservoir, built in 1908 as part of the construction of the Schwentine Hydropower Plants (Schwentine Wasserkraftwerke) by the shipyard builder, Bernhard Howaldt, and today is a fundamental component of the landscape park of the River Schwentine. To achieve this, Howaldt had first bought up lands along the Schwentine from the Count of Rantzau and Preetz Priory. The price of a hectare at that time was about 2,000 marks. Thanks to the Oppendorf and Rastorf Mills hydropower stations, now cultural monuments, the village of Raisdorf was first supplied with electricity in 1904. The hydropower plants are now operated and preserved by the Kiel Public Utility Company.
