= Fuhlensee =

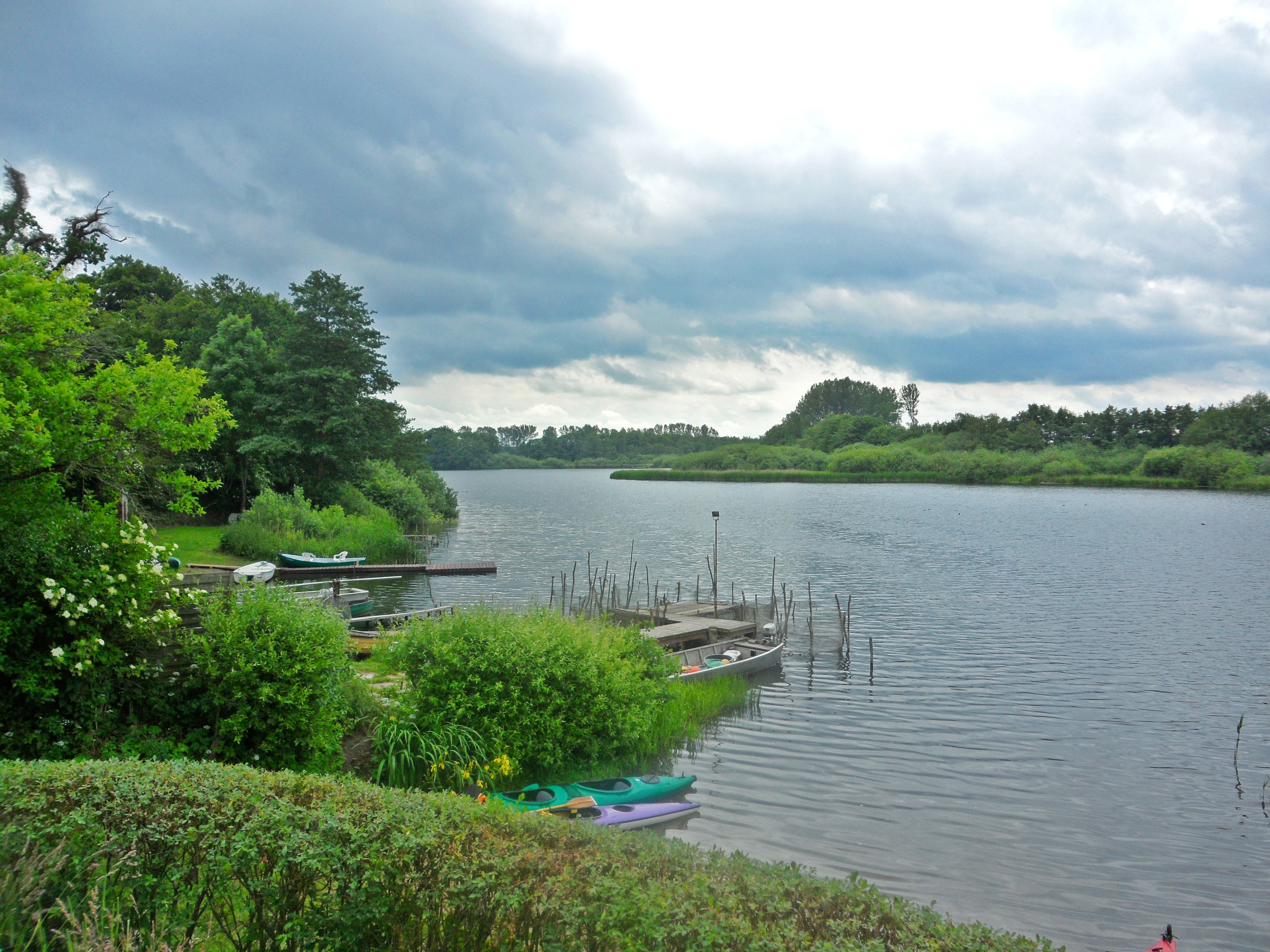

- Location within Schleswig-Holstein
- Location: Holsteinische Schweiz, Schleswig-Holstein
- Coordinates: 54°11′22″N 10°18′54″E
- Primary inflows: Schwentine
- Primary outflows: Schwentine
- Basin countries: Germany
- Surface area: 0.14 km^{2} (0.054 sq mi)
- Max. depth: 6 m (20 ft)
- Surface elevation: 20 m (66 ft)

Fuhlensee is a lake in Holstein Switzerland, in the North German state of Schleswig-Holstein. It lies on the River Schwentine between the Kronsee (upstream) and the Lanker See (downstream), south of Wahlstorf Manor House. It has a surface area of 0.14 km², is up to 6 metres deep and has an elevation of about 20 m above sea level (NN).
