= Preetz (disambiguation) =

Preetz is a town in the district of Plön, in Schleswig-Holstein, Northern Germany.

Preetz may also refer to:

- Preetz, Mecklenburg-Vorpommern, municipality in Mecklenburg-Vorpommern, Germany.
- Michael Preetz (born 1967), retired German footballer
