= Sibbersdorfer See =

Lake in Ostholstein, Schleswig-Holstein, Germany

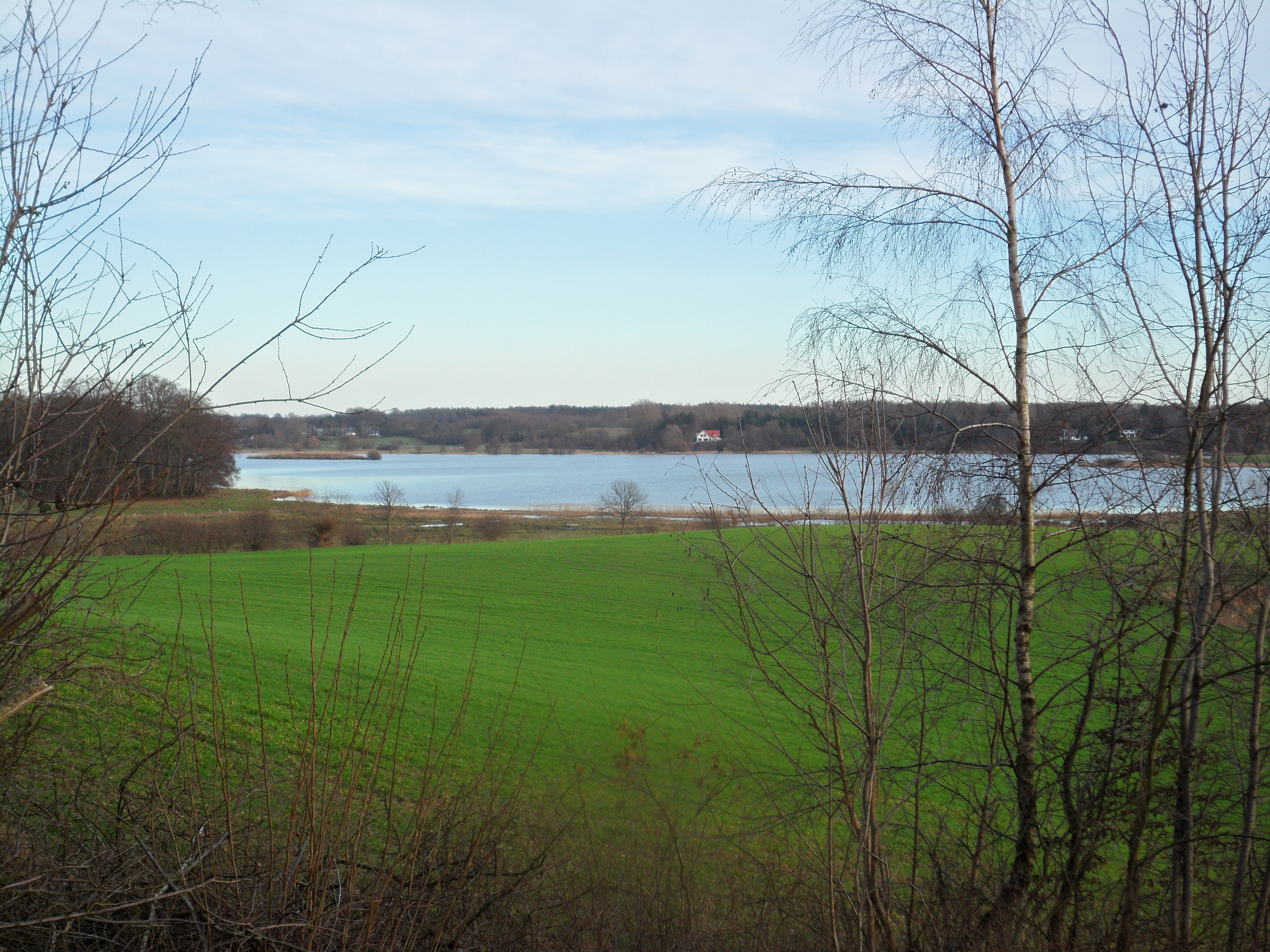
- SibbersdorferSee3

- Location within Schleswig-Holstein
- Location: Ostholstein district, Schleswig-Holstein, Germany
- Coordinates: 54°9′24″N 10°38′45″E
- Primary inflows: Schwentine
- Primary outflows: Schwentine
- Basin countries: Germany
- Surface area: 60 ha (150 acres)
- Max. depth: 7 m (23 ft)
- Surface elevation: 26.8 m (88 ft)

The Sibbersdorfer See is a lake in the district of Ostholstein within the region known as Holstein Switzerland in the North German state of Schleswig-Holstein.

It lies between Sibbersdorf and Fissau, north of the Großer Eutiner See, near the town of Eutin.

It has an area of 60 hectares (150 acres), is up to 7 metres deep, lies at an elevation of about 26.8 m above sea level (NN) and is crossed by the River Schwentine.

== Gull island ==
There is a gull island, about 5,000 square metres in area in the Sibbersdorfer See. Until it was sold in 1988, gull eggs were collected here. When this practice ended, the island became increasingly overgrown as it was no longer mown.

The Eutin-Malente Bird Conservation Group took over this maintenance function in 1995 and the number of breeding pairs increased again.

Reed buntings and reed warblers have no longer bred here since the end of the 1990s.

In 2004, 1,051 breeding pairs of birds of 19 species were counted, including: 750 pairs of black-headed gulls (1996: 50 pairs), three pairs of Mediterranean gulls, 22 pairs of common terns, 15 pairs of Canada geese, one pair of oystercatchers, two pairs of northern lapwing, 12 pairs of greylag geese, 49 pairs of tufted duck and a pair of mute swans.
