= Kellersee =

Lake in Malente, Schleswig-Holstein, Germany

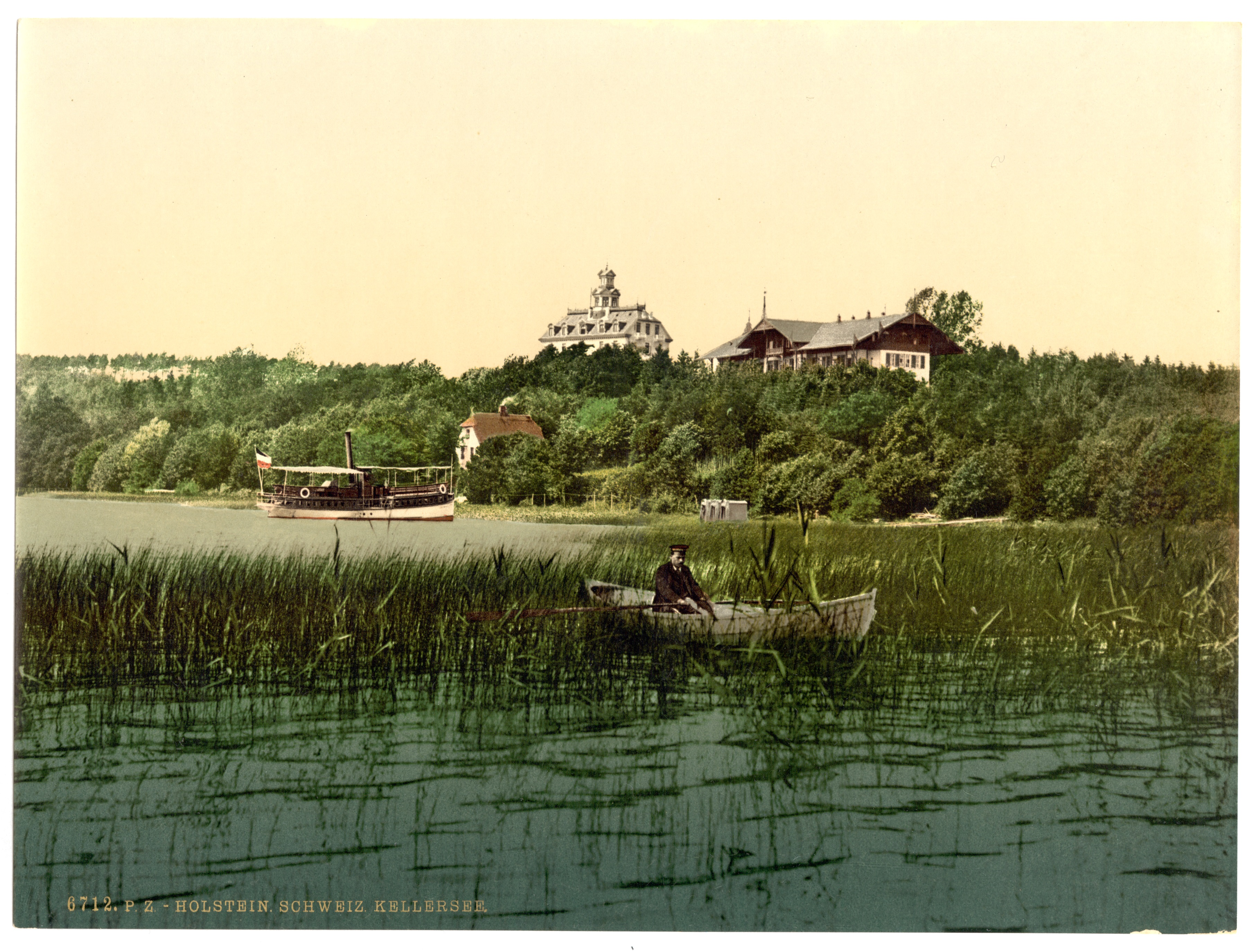
- The Kellersee between 1890 and 1905

- Location within Schleswig-Holstein
- Coordinates: 54°10′20″N 10°35′40″E
- Primary inflows: Schwentine
- Primary outflows: Schwentine
- Surface area: 5.6 km^{2} (2.2 sq mi)
- Max. depth: 27 m (89 ft)
- Surface elevation: 24 m (79 ft)
- Settlements: Malente, Eutin-Fissau

The Kellersee (German pronunciation) is a lake in the Holstein Switzerland region of North Germany. It lies east of the village of Malente on the River Schwentine, has an area of 560 hectares (1,400 acres), is up to 27 metres deep and lies at a height of 24 m above sea level (NN). Southeast of the lake is the village of Fissau in the borough of Eutin.

== Management ==
The Kellersee is managed by the Schwarten Fishery (Fischerei Schwarten) who also run a small pub right by the lakeshore.

== Water sports and ice skating ==
At some points on the lake there are dangerous katabatic winds (Fallwinde) that are often underestimated and may lead to serious problems. This occurs mainly in the Fissau Bay. At this point, the lake lies between two steep hills, due to its glacial history. In addition, the lake is particularly deep, because the Schwentine enters it here.

The adjacent Mondschein or Stille Bay freezes later than the lake, as does the area around the mouth of the Schwentine. The thin sheet of ice in these areas can be dangerous.

== Fishing ==
The Schwarten Fishery offers daily, weekly and monthly fishing permits for anglers. The lake has numerous bays and striking headlands that continue underwater and form great structures for predators. Some of the shores are forested, but often they are only lined by a narrow belt of trees. Because of the dense reed growth, the shore areas are difficult to access. Boat fishing is recommended. The lake bottom consists of gravel, sand and mud.

== See also ==
- List of lakes in Schleswig-Holstein
