= Holstein Switzerland Nature Park =

Nature park in Schleswig-Holstein, Germany

- Naturpark Holsteinische Schweiz
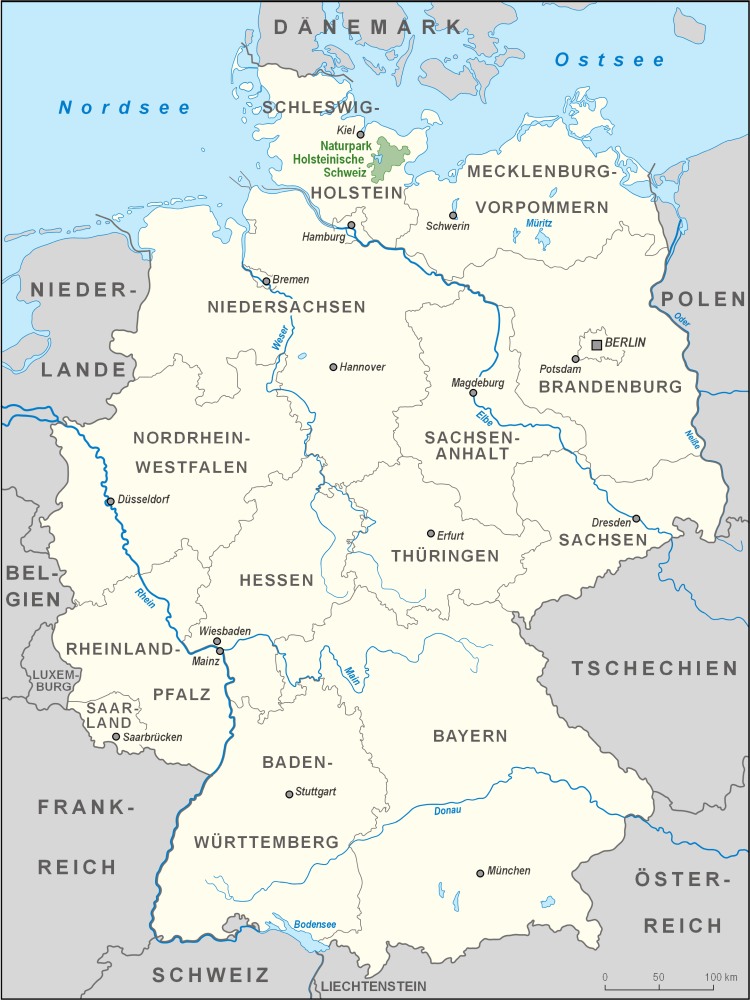
- Map of Holstein Switzerland Nature Park
- Location: Holstein Switzerland region, Schleswig-Holstein, Germany
- Coordinates: 54.129°N 10.511°E
- Established: 1986
- Website: www.naturpark-holsteinische-schweiz.de

The Holstein Switzerland Nature Park (German: Naturpark Holsteinische Schweiz) is a German federal nature park in the Holstein Switzerland region of Schleswig-Holstein.

In 1986 an association called the Naturpark Holsteinische Schweiz was founded. Its members were the districts of Ostholstein, Plön and Segeberg and the parishes within the nature park.

The Nature Park Information Centre is located in the so-called Uhrenhaus ("clock house") on the estate of Plön Castle.
