= Trammer See =

Lake in Germany

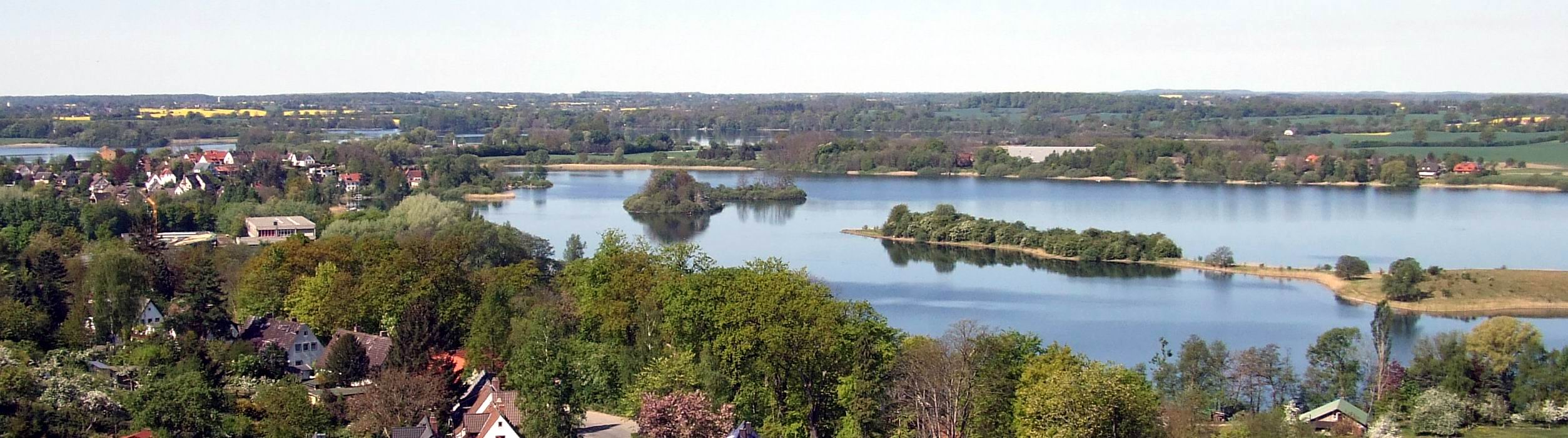

- Location within Schleswig-Holstein
- Location: Kreis Plön, Schleswig-Holstein
- Coordinates: 54.16866°N 10.40955°E
- Primary inflows: Schwentine
- Primary outflows: Schwentine
- Basin countries: Germany
- Surface area: 1.63 km^{2} (0.63 sq mi)
- Average depth: 11.1 m (36 ft)
- Max. depth: 33.4 m (110 ft)
- Surface elevation: 20.03 m (65.7 ft)
- Islands: 3 (Groter Warder)

Trammer See is a lake in Kreis Plön, Schleswig-Holstein, Germany. At an elevation of 20.03 m, its surface area is 1.63 km².
