= Schwentine Oxbow Lake =

Oxbow lake

Coordinates: 54°17′48″N 10°14′03″E

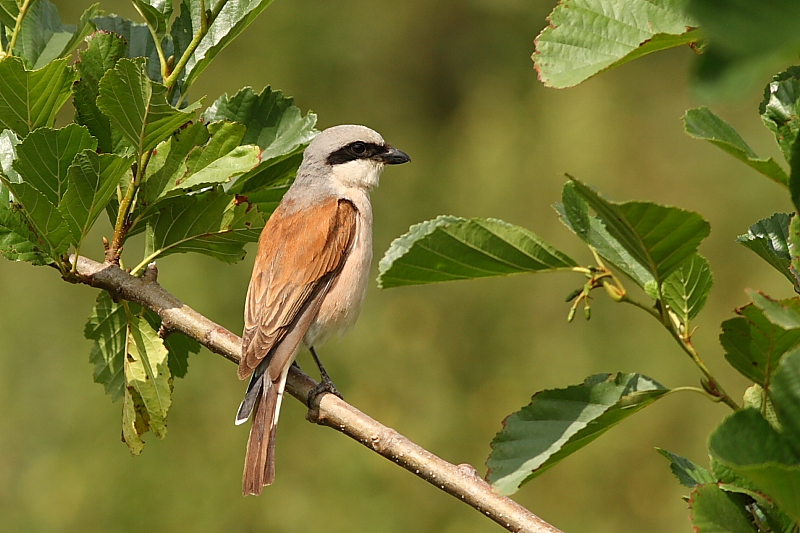
Red-backed shrike, male - one of the species that occur in the nature reserve

The Schwentine Oxbow Lake (German: Altarm der Schwentine) is an area around part of the River Schwentine between Raisdorf and Klausdorf that was designated a nature reserve in 1984. It received this conservation status because the waterbody has remained close to its natural state due to its steep river banks and is a habitat for a range of rare plants and animals. It covers an area of 19 hectares (47 acres). In addition to the section of river it includes an oxbow lake, a tributary, hedgerows, wooded river banks and slopes, rich in herbs, and small ponds.

The Schwentine valley, in which the nature reserve lies, was formed from a chain of dead-icefields that were left behind after the last ice age. After they had melted a chain of dammed-up lakes was formed and, when the water forced its way out, the present river valley of the Schwentine emerged.

== Fauna ==
Amongst the animal species occurring in the nature reserve are fish such as the trout, bleak, burbot and stickleback. It is also home to the blue-tailed damselfly and the emerald dragonfly. Native bird species include the kingfisher, grey wagtail and white-throated dipper. The first two breed in the nature reserve, whilst the dipper only rests and overwinters. In the ponds amongst the grasslands there are amphibians like the common toad, smooth newt, water frog, common frog and moor frog as well as grass snakes. The hedgerows are used by many animals including the red-backed shrike, great spotted woodpecker and tawny owl.

== Flora ==
In the near-natural riparian woods, ash and alder trees abound. In spring yellow wood anemone, bulbous corydalis and lesser celandine blossom in the woods. Opposite-leaved golden saxifrage and primrose grow on the wetter tracts of the nature reserve. There are also marsh marigold meadows which are also graced by flowers such as the western marsh orchid, water avens and goldilocks buttercup.

== Sources ==
- Landesamt für Natur und Umwelt des Landes Schleswig-Holstein (Hrsg): einzigartig – Naturführer durch Schleswig Holstein, Wachholtz Verlag, Neumünster 2008, ISBN 978-3-529-05415-0
