= Stendorfer See =

Lake in Europe

- Location within Schleswig-Holstein
- Location: Kasseedorf, Holstein Switzerland, Schleswig-Holstein, Germany
- Coordinates: 54.163°N 10.703°E
- Primary inflows: Schwentine
- Primary outflows: Schwentine
- Basin countries: Germany
- Max. length: 1.5 km (0.93 mi)
- Max. width: 0.7 km (0.43 mi)
- Surface area: 0.54 km^{2} (0.21 sq mi)
- Max. depth: 8 m (26 ft)
- Surface elevation: 32.6 m (107 ft)

The Stendorfer See is a lake west of Kasseedorf in Holstein Switzerland, Schleswig-Holstein, Germany.

The lake lies east of the Stendorf Manor House in the parish of Kasseedorf and is surrounded by a rolling moraine landscape.

The lake is oblong in shape with a maximum length of about 1,500 metres and a maximum width of about 700 metres. It has an area of some 54 hectares (130 acres) and a maximum depth of about 8 metres, the deepest point being near its northeastern shore. It lies at an elevation of around 32.6 m above sea level (NN).

The Stendorfer See is crossed by the River Schwentine from east to west. In addition several smaller lakes and ponds drain into it - including the Kolksee to the southwest and the Oberteich.

It is used as a fishing lake. In addition to pike, eel, perch, tench and stocked carp, burbot may also be caught occasionally.

== Sources ==
- Stendorfer See at www.umweltdaten.landsh.de (in German)
