= Lanker See =

Lake in Plön District, Schleswig-Holstein, Germany

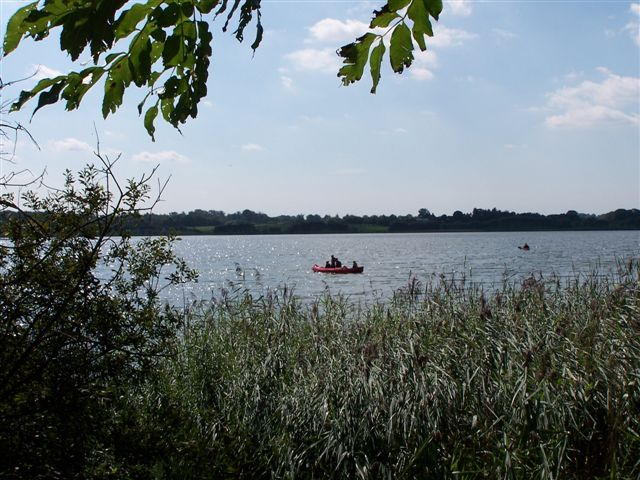
- The southern part of the Lanker See looking SW

- Location within Schleswig-Holstein
- Location: Plön district, Schleswig-Holstein, Germany
- Coordinates: 54°12′28″N 10°17′33″E
- Primary inflows: Schwentine from the Fuhlensee and other lakes
- Primary outflows: Schwentine to the Kirchsee
- Basin countries: Germany
- Surface area: 326.6 ha (807 acres)
- Average depth: 3.7 m (12 ft)
- Max. depth: 21 m (69 ft)
- Surface elevation: 19 m (62 ft)
- Settlements: Nearby: Preetz

The Lanker See is a lake in the region of Holstein Switzerland in North Germany. It lies south of the town of Preetz in the district of Plön, and is crossed from south to north by the River Schwentine.

The Lanker See has wealth of small bays. Almost the entire western area from the lakeshore to the tracks of the Preetz-Ascheberg railway line are a nature reserve.

The Lanker See has a surface area of 323.6 hectares (1.249 sq mi), is up to 21 metres deep and is about 19 m above sea level (NN). It is divided into a large northern and a smaller southern part, that are joined by a passage a little more than 1 metre deep. Without the islands its shore length is 17 km. The Lanker See lies in the borough of Preetz and the municipalities of Kühren, Wahlstorf and Schellhorn.
