= Holstein Switzerland =

Coordinates: 54.2°N 10.55°E

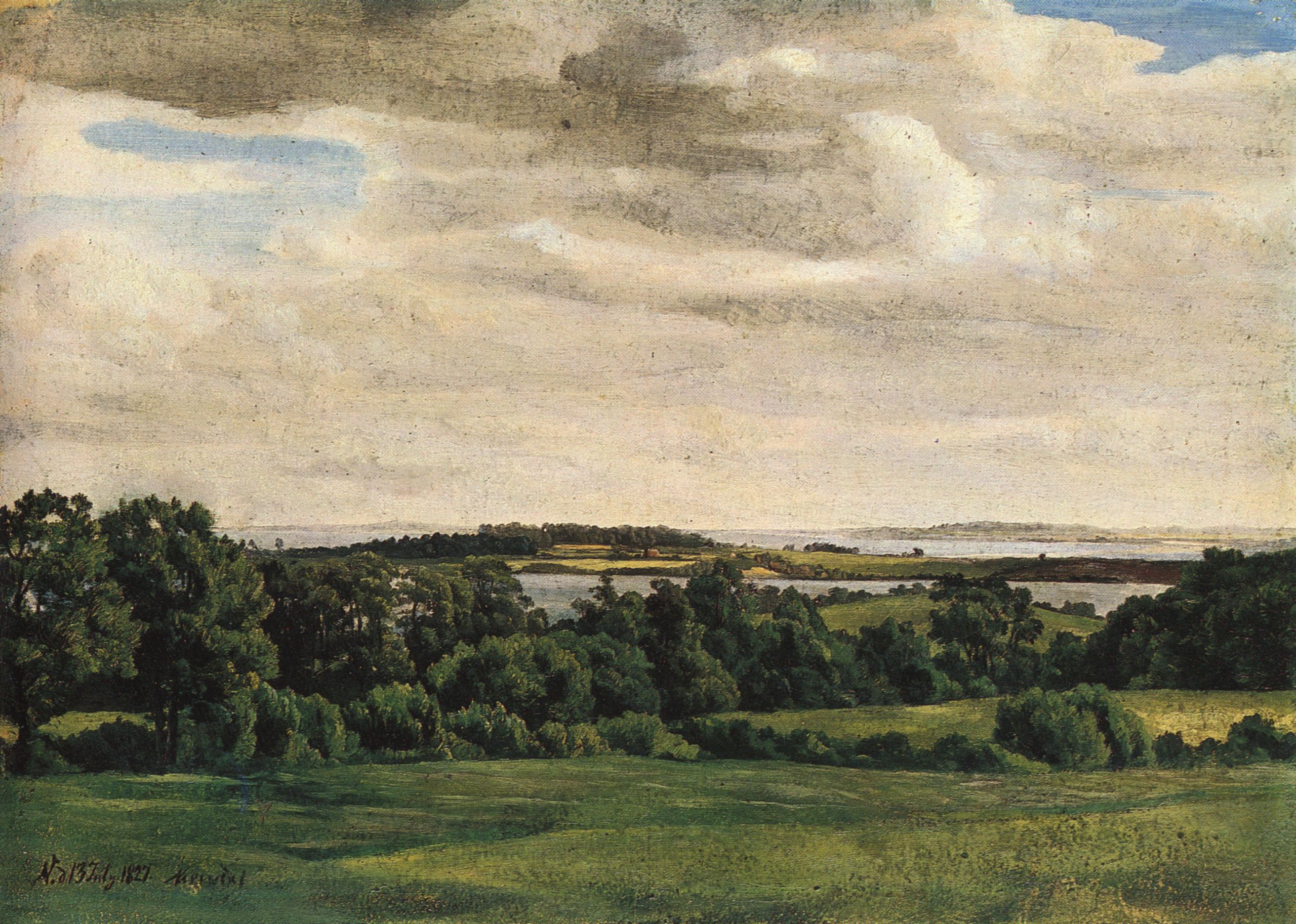
A 19th-century view: Holsteinische Landschaft, painting by Adolph Friedrich Vollmer (1827)

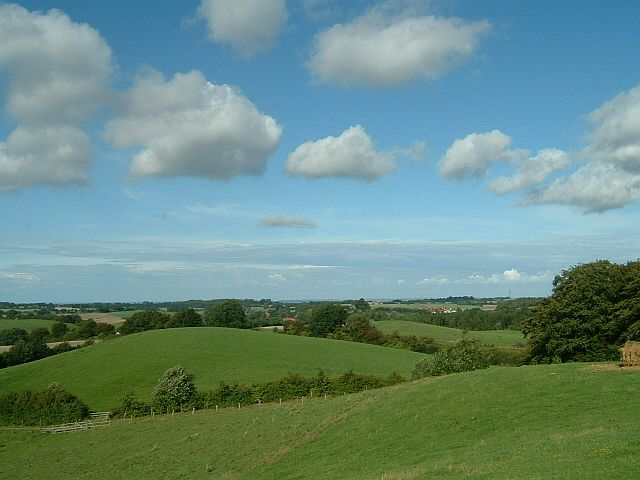
View from the Bungsberg

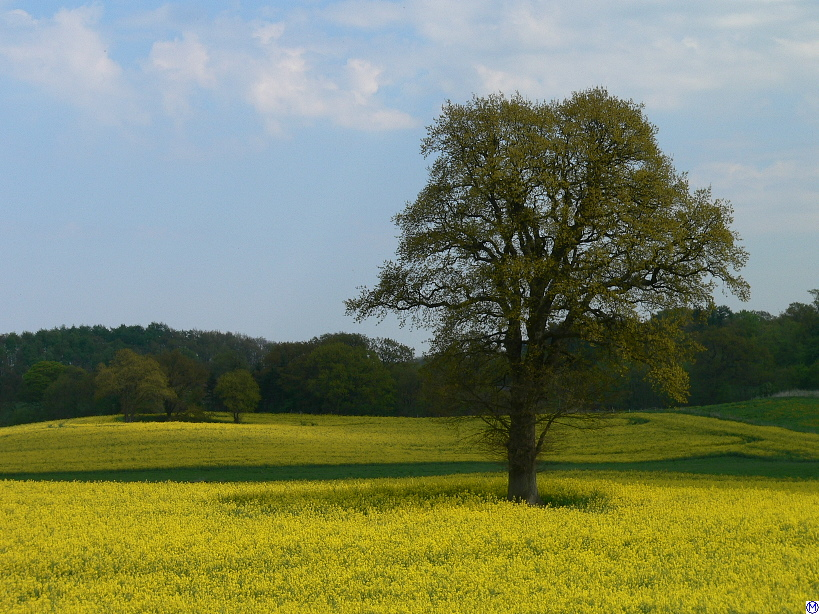
Rape field in bloom in Plön district

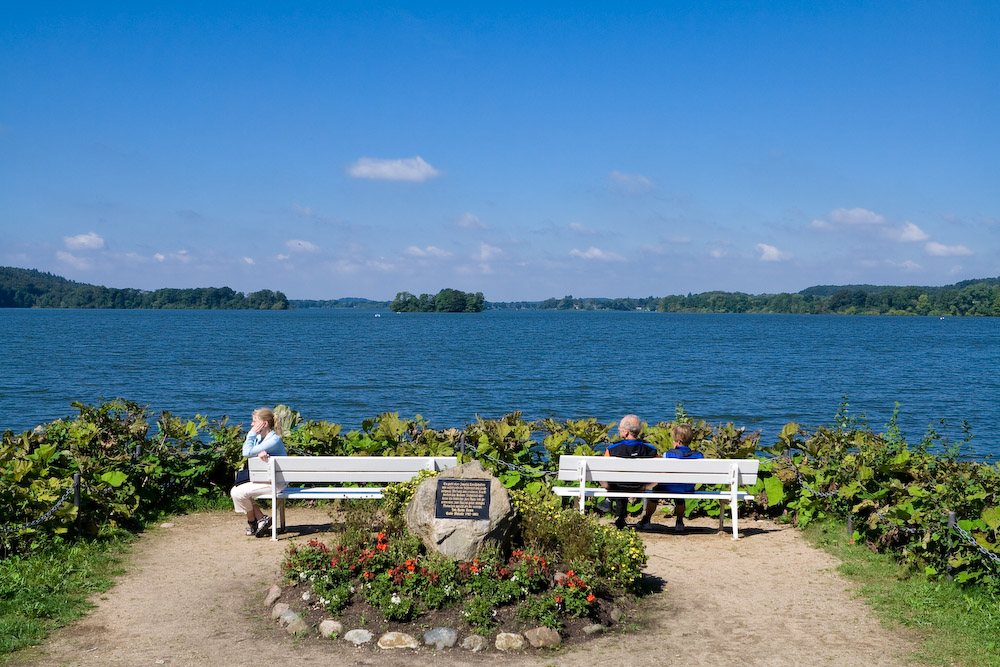
By the Dieksee

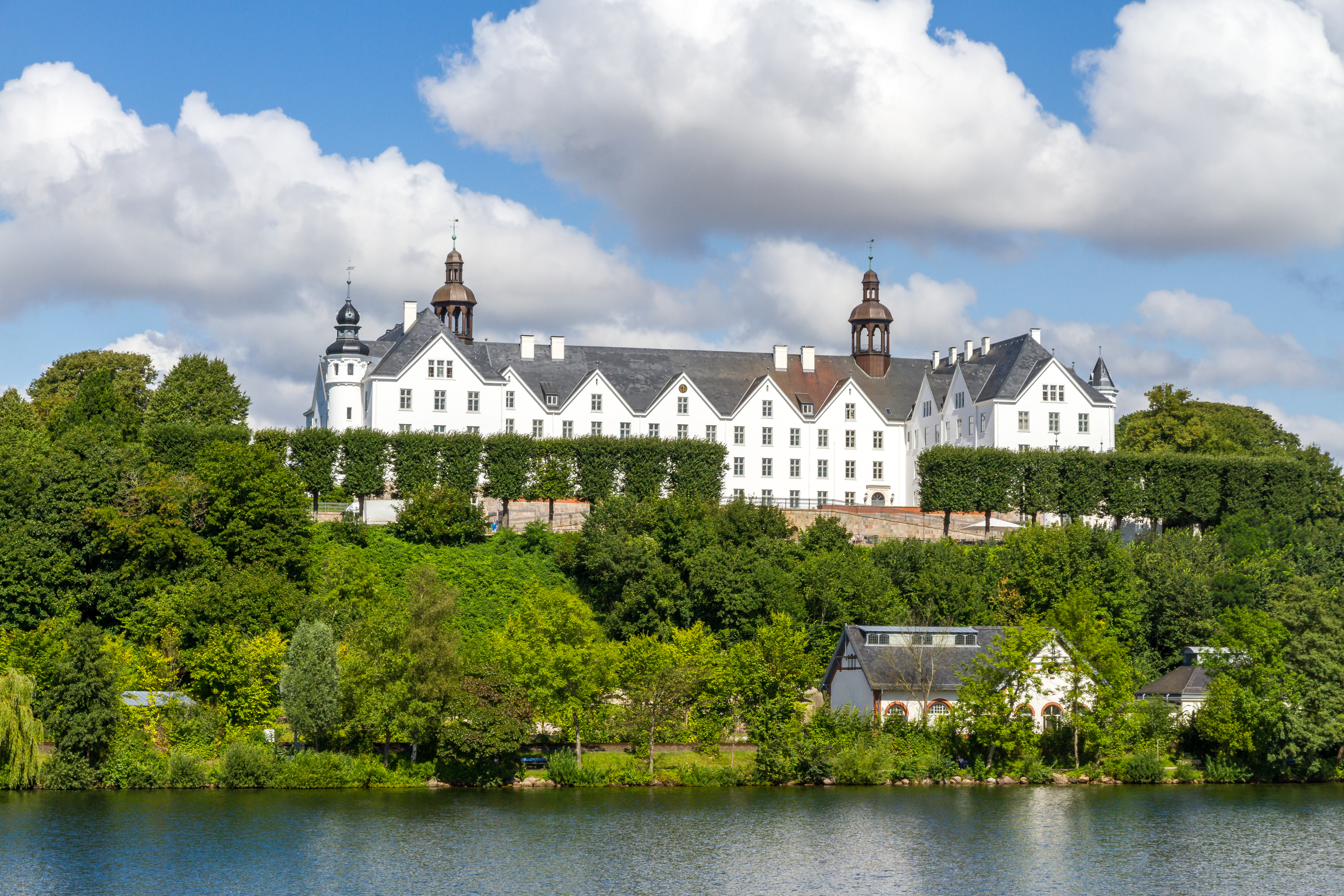
Plön Castle

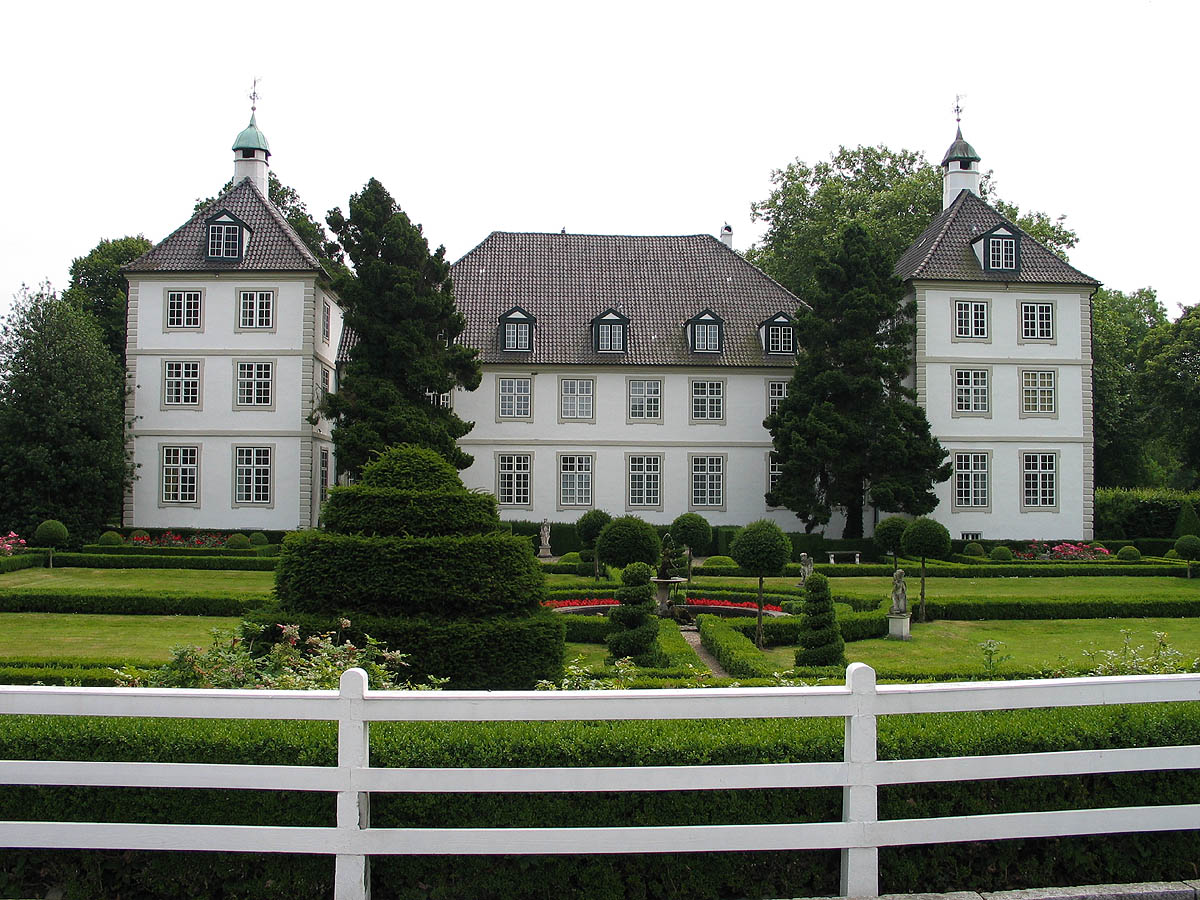
Manor house of Gut Panker

Holstein Switzerland (German: Holsteinische Schweiz) is a hilly area with a patchwork of lakes and forest in Schleswig Holstein, Germany, reminiscent of Swiss landscape. Its highest point is the Bungsberg (168 metres above sea level). It is a designated nature park as well as an important tourist destination in Northern Germany situated between the cities of Kiel and Lübeck.

== Geography ==
Holstein Switzerland lies in eastern Schleswig-Holstein. This picturesque region in the historical county of Wagria has no precise political or geographic boundaries. Most of the area falls within the districts of Ostholstein and Plön, roughly between the cities of Lübeck and Kiel and extends as far north as the Baltic coast. Its major towns include Bad Malente-Gremsmühlen, Lütjenburg, Oldenburg in Holstein, Preetz and the old Residenz seats of Eutin and Plön.

The charm of this region is its ever-changing landscape of the Young Drift moraines of the Schleswig-Holstein Uplands which were formed during the last ice age. Small woods alternate rapidly with hedged, arable fields and the terrain is characterised by its many lakes nestling amongst low hills. Amongst the more well-known lakes are the Großer Plöner See, the Dieksee and the Kellersee. Rivers and water meadows abound, such as the Schwentine, which flows into Kiel Fjord or the Kossau, which discharges into the Großer Binnensee. The highest elevation is the Bungsberg near Schönwalde. With the only ski lift in Schleswig-Holstein and a height of 168 metres (551 ft) above NN it is also the highest hill in the state.

== Origin of the name ==
The German name for the region, Holsteinische Schweiz, goes back to the 19th century when holidaying in Switzerland was particularly popular amongst the well-to-do. As a consequence, other regions strove to add the name "Switzerland" to their description. (By this time, Saxon Switzerland had already been known as such for a century). On 20 May 1885 Johannes Janus opened the Hotel Holsteinische Schweiz at Malente on the Kellersee which enjoyed enormous popularity. The name of the hotel was then transferred to Holsteinische Schweiz station and, later, to the whole region.

== History ==
Holstein Switzerland has been settled for several thousand years. In the Early Middle Ages part of the area was occupied by the Slavic Wends, whose traces may still be found, for example, in Oldenburg, and who founded the settlements of Plön and Eutin. In the Middle Ages, from the 9th century onwards, the region was colonised and controlled by the Carolingian Empire. In the late Middle Ages the towns developed into small centres of local commerce and the local feudal lords (Landadel) expanded their fortified manor houses. At the beginning of the recent era, these manorial seats formed the basis of aristocratic estates (Adliges Güter) which dominated the landscape and the economy from about 1500 until the 20th century. From the 16th century Plön and Eutin became residences of various branches of the House of Oldenburg.

These estates had a thriving cultural scene which, for example, led to Eutin being described at the turn of the 19th century as the "Weimar of the North". Until the middle of the 19th century the area was dominated by Denmark, which initially ran the region as a feoff, but eventually integrated it into the Danish nation-state. In 1867 Holstein Switzerland was transferred to Prussia as part of Holstein. After the end of the First World War some of the traditional estates were broken up. Following the Second World War, tourism has played a leading role in the economy of the region.

== Tourism ==
The rural landscape is still characterised by large, aristocratic estates and historic forms of farming that are mainly tied into large farm estates and their associated manor houses. These include Panker, Testorf, Rantzau and Hagen in Probsteierhagen. Several of the castles, such as Eutin and Plön may be visited and many of the estate farms are open to the public during the Schleswig-Holstein Musik Festival or other events.

== Lakes ==
In order of size:

- Großer Plöner See 3000 ha
- Kellersee 560 ha
- Dieksee 386 ha
- Lanker See 324 ha
- Behler See 277 ha
- Postsee 276 ha
- Kleiner Plöner See 239 ha
- Großer Eutiner See 230 ha
- Stocksee 207 ha
- Trammer See 163 ha
- Suhrer See 137 ha
- Schluensee 127 ha
- Schöhsee 78 ha
- Süseler See 77 ha
- Seedorfer See 76 ha
- Sibbersdorfer See 55 ha
- Stendorfer See 54 ha
- Seekamper See 45 ha
- Kleiner Eutiner See 37 ha
- Ukleisee 32 ha

== See also ==
- List of nature parks in Germany
- Little Switzerland (landscape)
