= Lasse Petersdotter =

German politician (born 1990)

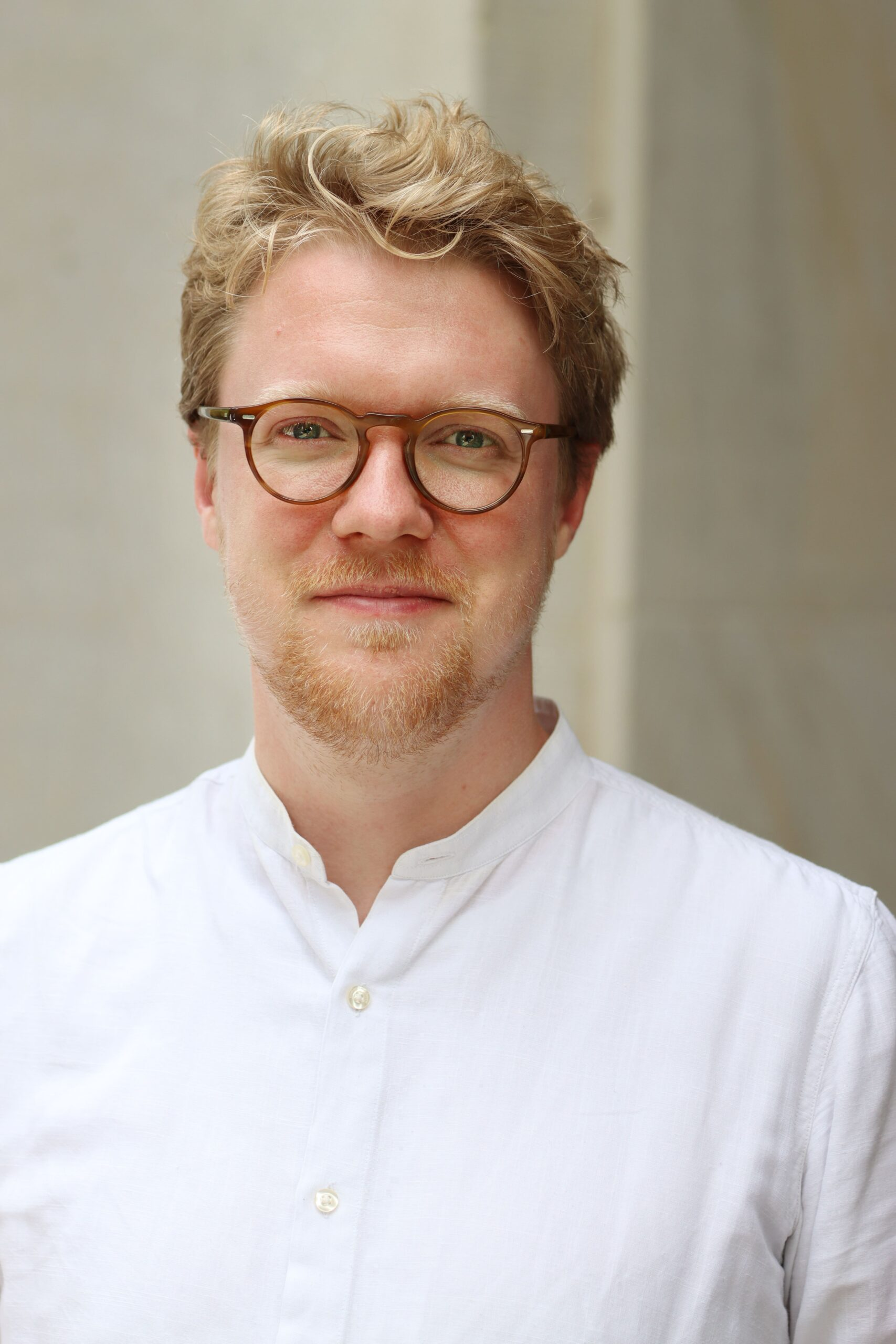
- Petersdotter in 2024

Member of the Landtag of Schleswig-Holstein
- Incumbent
- Assumed office 6 June 2017
- Constituency: Kiel-Nord (2022–present)

Personal details
- Born: 8 May 1990 (age 35) Preetz
- Party: Alliance 90/The Greens

Lasse Petersdotter (born 8 May 1990 in Preetz) is a German politician serving as a member of the Landtag of Schleswig-Holstein since 2017. He has served as group leader of Alliance 90/The Greens since 2022.
