= Postsee =

Lake in Plön District, Schleswig-Holstein, Germany

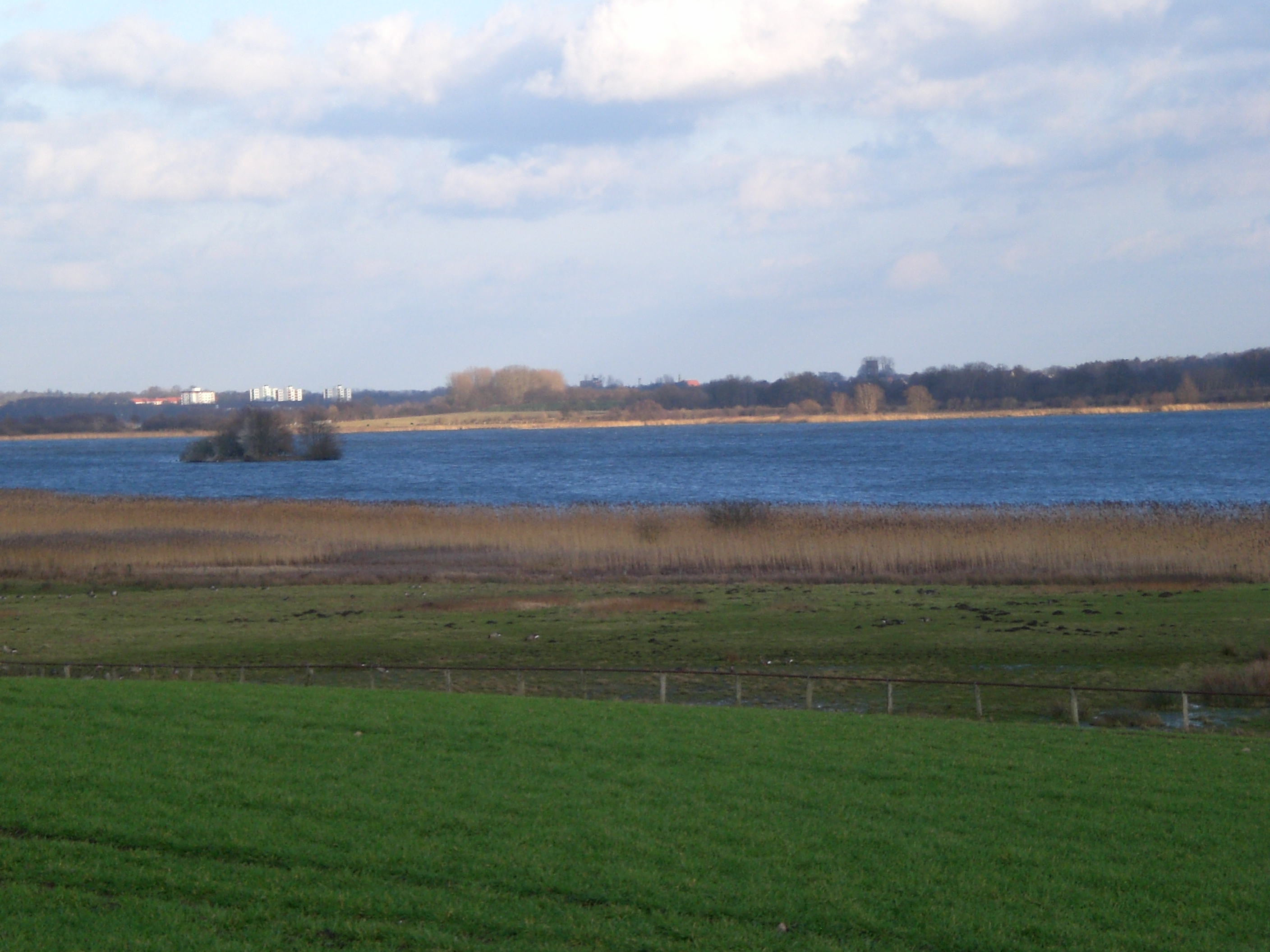

- Location within Schleswig-Holstein
- Location: Kreis Plön, Schleswig-Holstein
- Coordinates: 54°13′50″N 10°14′27″E
- Primary inflows: Alte Schwentine, Nettelau, Honigau, Neuwührener Au
- Primary outflows: Schwentine
- Basin countries: Germany
- Max. length: 4.8 km (3.0 mi)
- Max. width: 1.2 km (0.75 mi)
- Surface area: 276.4 ha (683 acres)
- Average depth: 3.9 m (13 ft)
- Max. depth: 9.1 m (30 ft)
- Shore length^{1}: 11.1 km (6.9 mi)
- Surface elevation: 20.6 m (68 ft)
- Settlements: Preetz
- ^{1} Shore length is not a well-defined measure.

Postsee is a lake in Kreis Plön, Schleswig-Holstein, Germany. It has an elevation of 20.6 metres (68 ft) above sea level and a surface area of 276.4 hectares (1.067 sq mi).
