= Grebin =

- Municipality
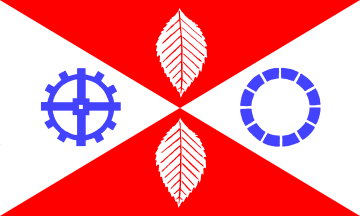
- Flag Coat of arms

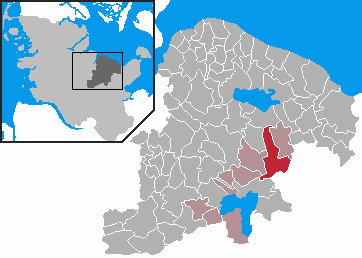
- Location of Grebin within Plön district
- Interactive map of Grebin
- Location within Germany Location within Schleswig-Holstein
- Coordinates: 54°12′11″N 10°28′33″E
- Country: Germany
- State: Schleswig-Holstein
- District: Plön
- Municipal assoc.: Großer Plöner See

Government
  - Mayor: Hans-Werner Sohn

Area
  - Total: 24.14 km^{2} (9.32 sq mi)
- Elevation: 26 m (85 ft)

Population (2025-12-31)
  - Total: 960
  - Density: 40/km^{2} (100/sq mi)
- Time zone: UTC+01:00 (CET)
  - Summer (DST): UTC+02:00 (CEST)
- Postal codes: 24329
- Dialling codes: 04383
- Vehicle registration: PLÖ
- Website: www.amt-grosser- ploener-see.de

Grebin is a municipality in the district of Plön, in Schleswig-Holstein, Germany.

The districts of Behl, Breitenstein, Kakelsberg, Görnitz, Treufeld and Schönweide, which was incorporated in 1974, belong to Grebin.
