= Schöhsee =

Lake in Germany

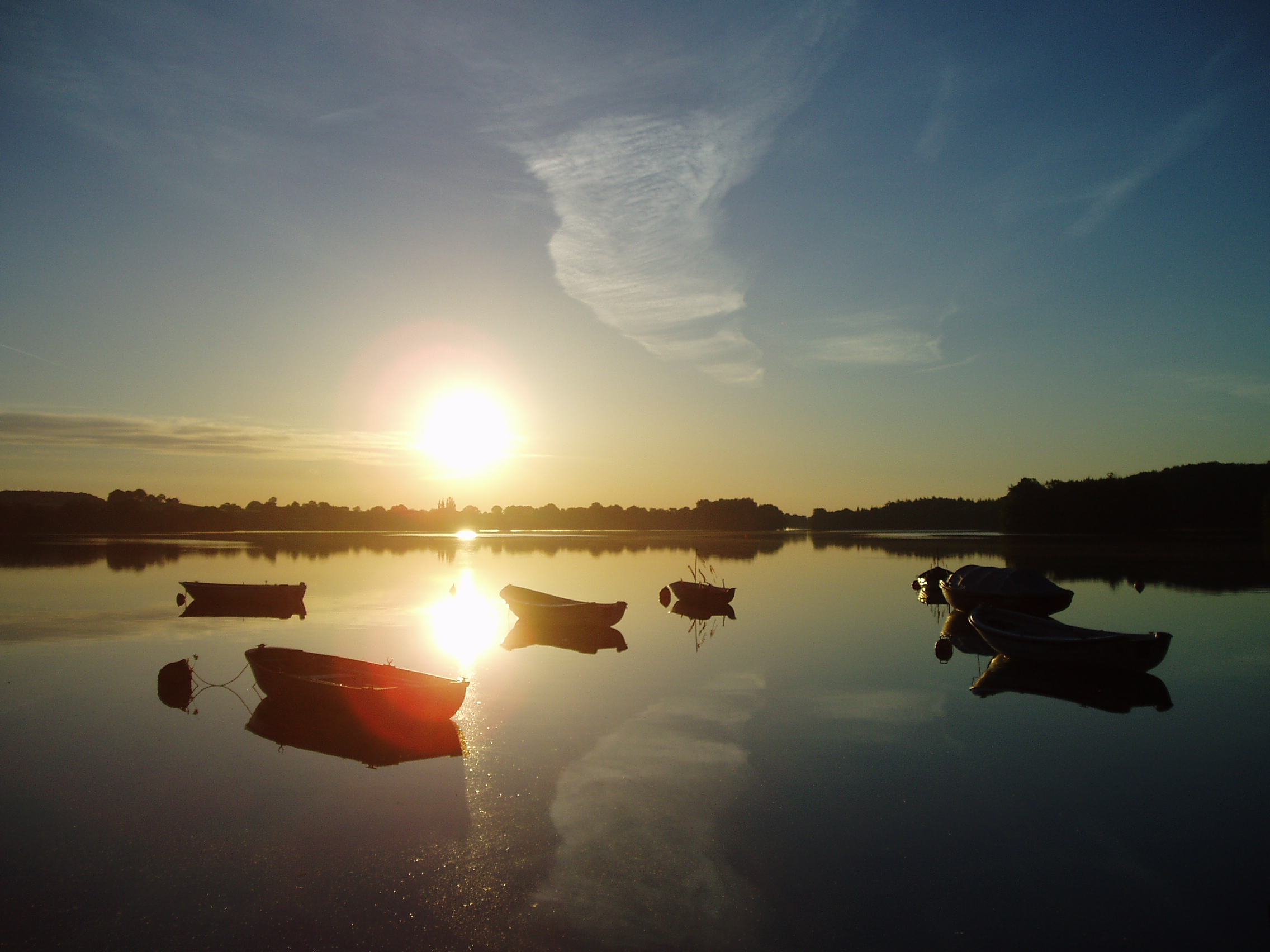
- Dawn over the Schöhsee

- Location within Schleswig-Holstein
- Location: Schleswig-Holstein
- Coordinates: 54°9′55″N 10°26′22″E
- Basin countries: Germany
- Max. length: 1.6 km (0.99 mi)
- Max. width: 0.6 km (0.37 mi)
- Surface area: 0.78 km^{2} (0.30 sq mi)
- Average depth: 10.9 m (36 ft)
- Max. depth: 29.3 m (96 ft)
- Water volume: 8,500,000 m^{3} (300,000,000 cu ft)
- Shore length^{1}: 4.8 km (3.0 mi)
- Surface elevation: 22 m (72 ft)
- ^{1} Shore length is not a well-defined measure.

Schöhsee is a lake in Schleswig-Holstein, Germany. At an elevation of 22 m, its surface area is 0.78 km².
