= Großer Plöner See =

Largest lake in Schleswig-Holstein, Germany

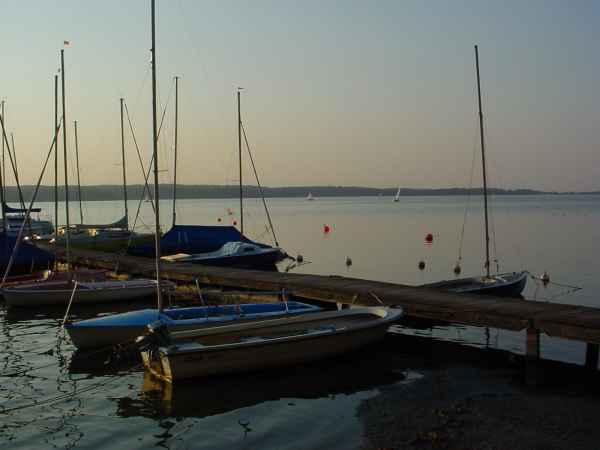
- Jetty at Bosau

- Location within Schleswig-Holstein
- Location: Eastern Schleswig-Holstein
- Coordinates: 54°7′49″N 10°24′51″E
- Primary inflows: Schwentine
- Primary outflows: Schwentine
- Catchment area: 393 km^{2} (152 sq mi)
- Basin countries: Germany
- Max. length: 8.3 km (5.2 mi)
- Max. width: 7.1 km (4.4 mi)
- Surface area: 29.97 km^{2} (11.57 sq mi)
- Average depth: 13.54 m (44.4 ft)
- Max. depth: 58 m (190 ft) (east of Nehmten)
- Water volume: 373×10^{6} m^{3} (13.2×10^{9} cu ft)
- Residence time: 3 years
- Shore length^{1}: 49.6 km (30.8 mi)
- Surface elevation: 21 m (69 ft)
- Settlements: Plön, Dersau, Bosau, Ascheberg
- References: Von Natur aus oligotrophes Gewässer, durch Umwelteinflüsse trotz eingeleiteter Gegenmaßnahmen jedoch noch immer leicht eutroph
- ^{1} Shore length is not a well-defined measure.

The Großer Plöner See ("Great Plön Lake") or Lake Plön ("Plöner See", German pronunciation: [ˈpløːnɐ zeː]) is the largest lake (30 km^{2}) in Schleswig-Holstein, Germany. It is located near the town of Plön. Its main tributary, as well as its main outflow, is the River Schwentine.

== Geography ==
=== General ===
With an area of about 30 km^{2} and a depth of up to 58 m, the Großer Plöner See is the largest and deepest lake in the state of Schleswig-Holstein. It lies wholly within the Holstein Switzerland Nature Park.
On its north shore lies the county town of Plön, whose emblem depicts the lake below Plön Castle situated on a hill. Other settlements on the shore of the Großer Plöner See are Bosau, Dersau and Ascheberg.

=== Origin ===
The Große Plöner See emerged as a consequence of the glaciation of Schleswig-Holstein after the last ice age. It is a typical Weichselian glacial lake known as a Zungenbecken, whose shape may be especially well seen on the southern shore between Bosau and Nehmten. Two glaciers were largely responsible for forming the 58 m deep Plön Basin in the east and shallower 30 m deep Ascherberger Basin in the west. The northern boundary of the lake consists of a land bridge between the Great and Little Plön Lakes, which was formed during a later advance of the ice sheet as a terminal moraine.

=== Islands ===
The eastern and the western parts of the lake are connected by an area of shallow water which was designated in 1992 as a nature reserve. This area is the largest of the islands, providing a sheltered and quiet, breeding and moulting area for bird species such as white-tailed eagle, goldeneye, goosander, and greylag goose.

The Princes' Island (Prinzeninsel), which became a peninsula in the 19th century when the water level was artificially lowered, extends from here for 2 km to the north and is a popular summer destination for tourists.
Another nature reserve that has existed since 1955, is located in the western part of the lake around the Ascheberger Warder. Overall, there are more than 20 islands scattered around the Großer Plöner See.

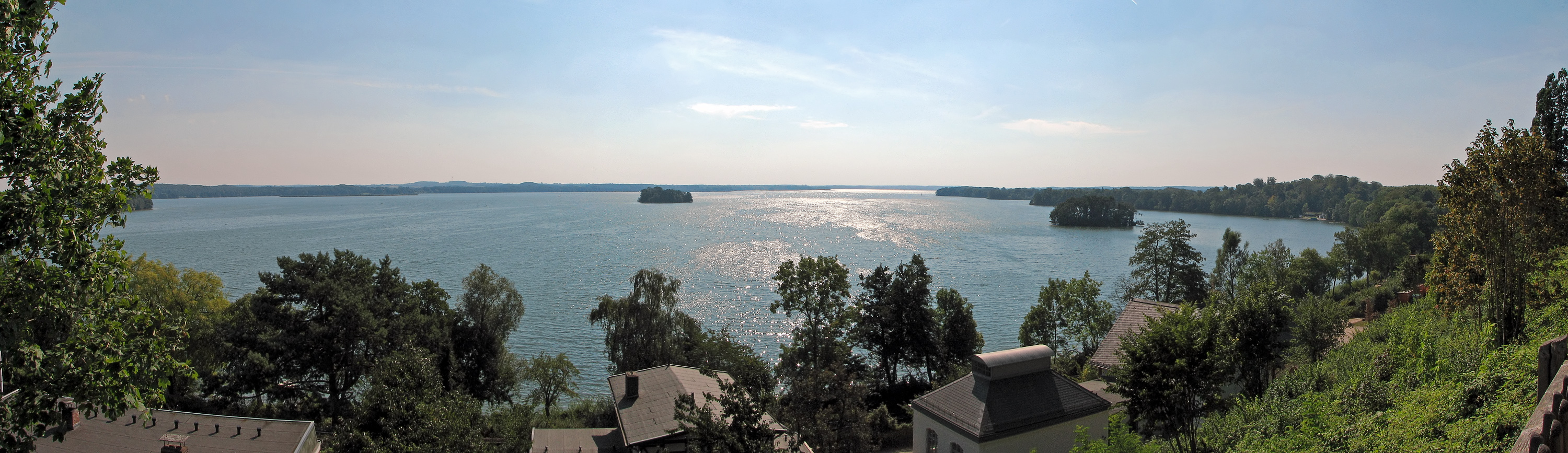
Panorama of the lake

== History ==
=== Settlement ===
The lakeshore was used during the Middle Stone Age (c. 10000–4300 BC) by hunters, gatherers, and fishers. From the New Stone Age (c. 4300–2300 BC), through the Bronze Age (c. 2300–550 BC) and into the Iron Age (c. 550 BC–400 AD) it was settled by farmers more or less continuously.
From the 8th to the 12th century the region around the Plöner See was settled by Slavs. There is still evidence of this in the Olsborg, an island south of Plön, that was heavily fortified. The Slavs called it Plune, which meant "ice-free water". In 1139 the Holstein count Adolf II of Schauenburg destroyed the fort and ended Slav rule over the Plön region.

== Economic use ==
The lake area is divided amongst several private owners as well as the state of Schleswig-Holstein. About 900 ha of the lake is rented out until 2020.

The lake is fished by several professional fishermen. Species of fish include eel, perch, bream, pike, tench, carp, whiting, and whitefish.

== Tourism and leisure facilities ==
The lake and its surroundings are a popular recreational area for residents of the metropolitan areas of Kiel, Lübeck, and Hamburg as well as a centre of tourism within Holstein Switzerland. There are a total of 15 bathing sites. Some campsites (including Bosau and Ruhleben) are located directly on the lakeshore. There is a wide range of recreational activities such as boating, sailing, diving, and fishing. During the summer pleasure boats ply the lake.

== Fishing ==
In order to make the Holsteinische Schweiz fishing area more attractive to tourists, the fishing licensees have decided to combine their leases into a single guest fishing permit allowing fishing over the entire lake area. The responsible authority is the Landessportfischerverband Schleswig-Holstein e.V. In summer, fishing at night is permitted for an additional fee. Boat rentals can be found in Plön. There are also plenty of slipways on the shores for those who want to use their own boat for fishing at Großer Plöner See.

== See also ==
- List of lakes in Schleswig-Holstein
- List of lakes in Germany

== Sources ==
- Muuß, Uwe; Petersen, Marcus; König, Dietrich (1973). Die Binnengewässer Schleswig-Holsteins. 162 pp., numerous photos, Wachholtz-Verlag Neumünster. ISBN 3-529-05302-3
