= Schwentine =

River in Schleswig-Holstein, Germany

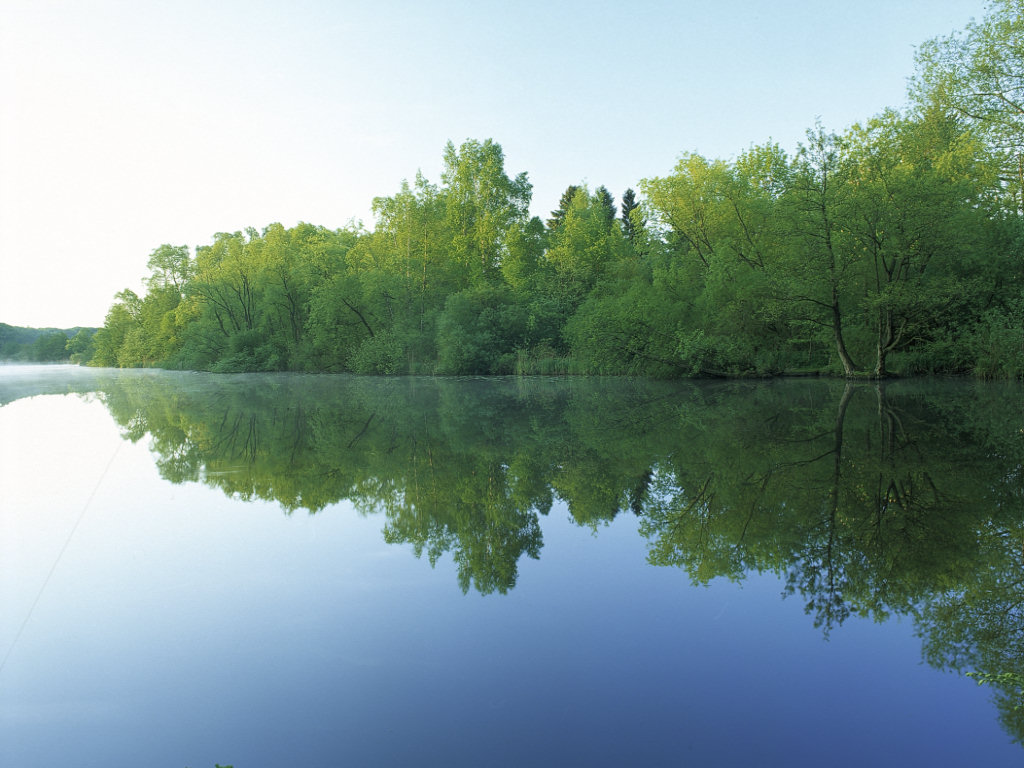
- The Schwentine near Kiel

Location
- Country: Germany
- State: Schleswig-Holstein
- Reference no.: DE: 9614

Physical characteristics
- Source
  - location: Bungsberg
- Mouth
  - location: between the Kiel districts of Neumühlen-Dietrichsdorf and Wellingdorf into the Kiel Fjord
  - coordinates: 54°19′39″N 10°11′10″E
- Length: 62 km

Basin features
- Landmarks: Cities: Kiel; Small towns: Eutin, Plön, Preetz, Schwentinental; Villages: Malente
- Tributaries
  - left: Alte Schwentine
  - right: Spolsau
- Waterbodies: Lakes: Stendorfer See, Sibbersdorfer See, Großer Eutiner See, Kellersee, Dieksee, Langensee, Behler See, Höftsee, Großer Plöner See, Stadtsee, Schwanensee, Kleiner Plöner See, Kronsee, Fuhlensee, Lanker See, Kirchsee; Reservoirs: Rosensee

The Schwentine (German pronunciation: [ʃvɛnˈtiːnə]) is a river in the North German state of Schleswig-Holstein. It is approximately 62 kilometres (39 mi) long and rises on the hill of Bungsberg, the highest point in the state, near the village of Kasseedorf in Ostholstein. It then runs from its source to Kiel where it flows into the Kiel Fjord, a bay of the Baltic Sea. It passes through several lakes, including the Großer Plöner See, the largest lake in Schleswig-Holstein, as well as the towns Eutin, Malente, Plön, Preetz and Kiel.

== Water management ==
The Schwentine is of great importance in the supply of drinking water managed by the Kiel Utilities Company. The Schwentine Valley Waterworks (Wasserwerk Schwentinetal) has been located near Klausdorf since about 1900.

Although the Schwentine valley gives an exceptionally natural impression along virtually its entire length, it is closely linked to the industrialisation of the city of Kiel. Two hydroelectric plants, now classed as cultural monuments, (one on the Rosensee) were laid out by the shipyard founder, Bernhard Howaldt, and are still in operation today.

The once great mill industry no longer exists today. The old Howaldt Shipyard (that was merged into the firm of HDW), of which only the old metal foundry remains, was given a new lease of life as an industrial museum. Thanks to various sponsor programmes (e. g. the EU's URBAN II programme) the region around the Schwentine estuary has gradually lost its character as an industrial wasteland.

Apart from the immediate area of the estuary, no cargo boats use the Schwentine. Instead there are excursion boats (5-Seen-Fahrt, Schwentinetalfahrt) and rowing boats.

== Nature conservation ==
The Schwentine Oxbow Lake (Altarm der Schwentine) is a part of the Schwentine that has been designated as nature reserve since 1984. It received this conservation status because the waterbody has remained close to its natural state due to its steep river banks and is a habitat for a range of rare plants and animals. It covers an area of 19 hectares (47 acres). In addition to the section of river it includes an ox bow lake, a tributary, hedgerows, wooded river banks and slopes, rich in herbs, and small ponds.

== History ==
The name Schwentine comes from the Baltic Šventinė (meaning 'The holy one'; in German, die Heilige); or from the Slavic word Sventana, of similar meaning.

The original source of the Schwentine was not on the Bungsberg, but in the vicinity of Bornhöved. The source of the present-day Alte Schwentine is viewed by historians, natural scientists and linguistic researchers as the original source of the Schwentine. During the Early and High Middle Ages the little river marked the border between the German or Saxon region, which extended to the Baltic Sea near Kiel, and the Slav-settled regions in the present-day Ostholstein.

In the Battle of Bornhöved on the field of Sventanafeld (Sventanapolje or "Schwentine field") near the village of Bornhöved near Neumünster in 798 the Obodrites, led by Drożko, allied with the Franks, defeated the Nordalbingian Saxons.

See also: Wagria, Limes Saxoniae.

== Photos ==
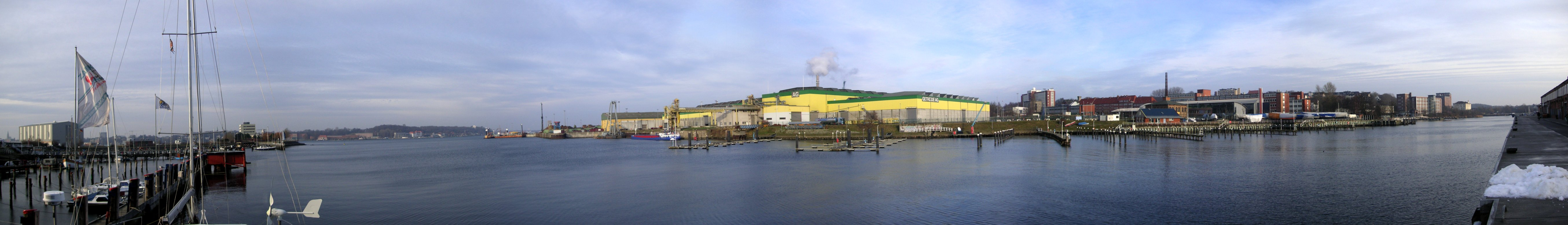
The mouth of the River Schwentine at Kiel Fischmarkt

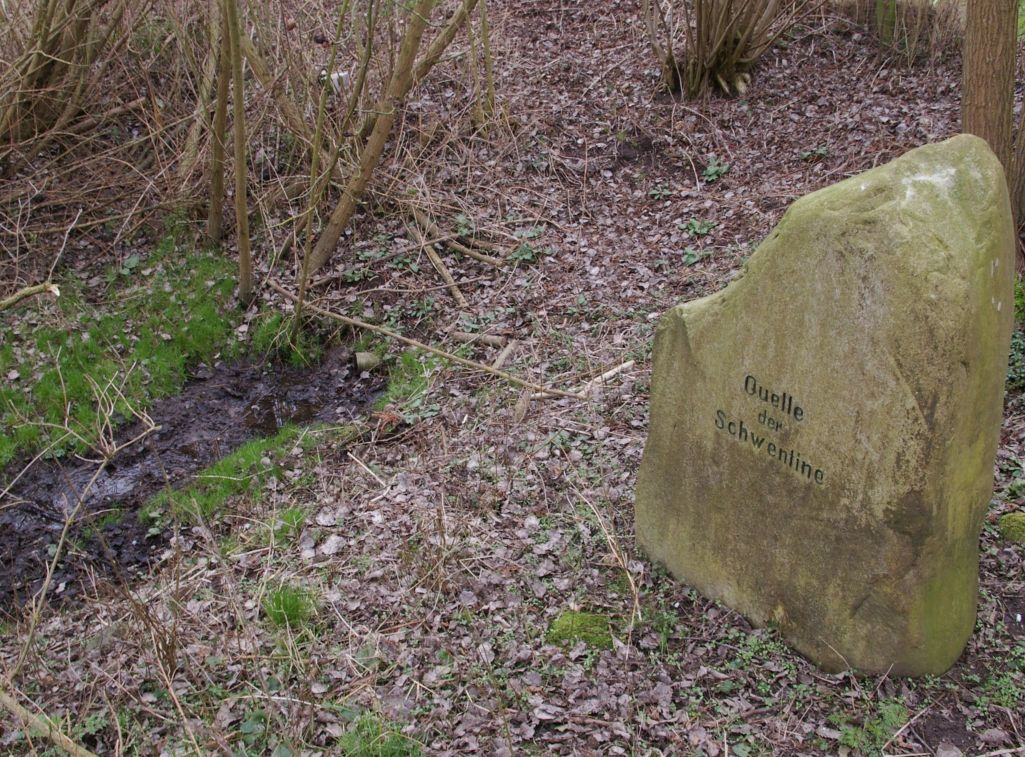
Source of the Alte Schwentine near Bornhöved

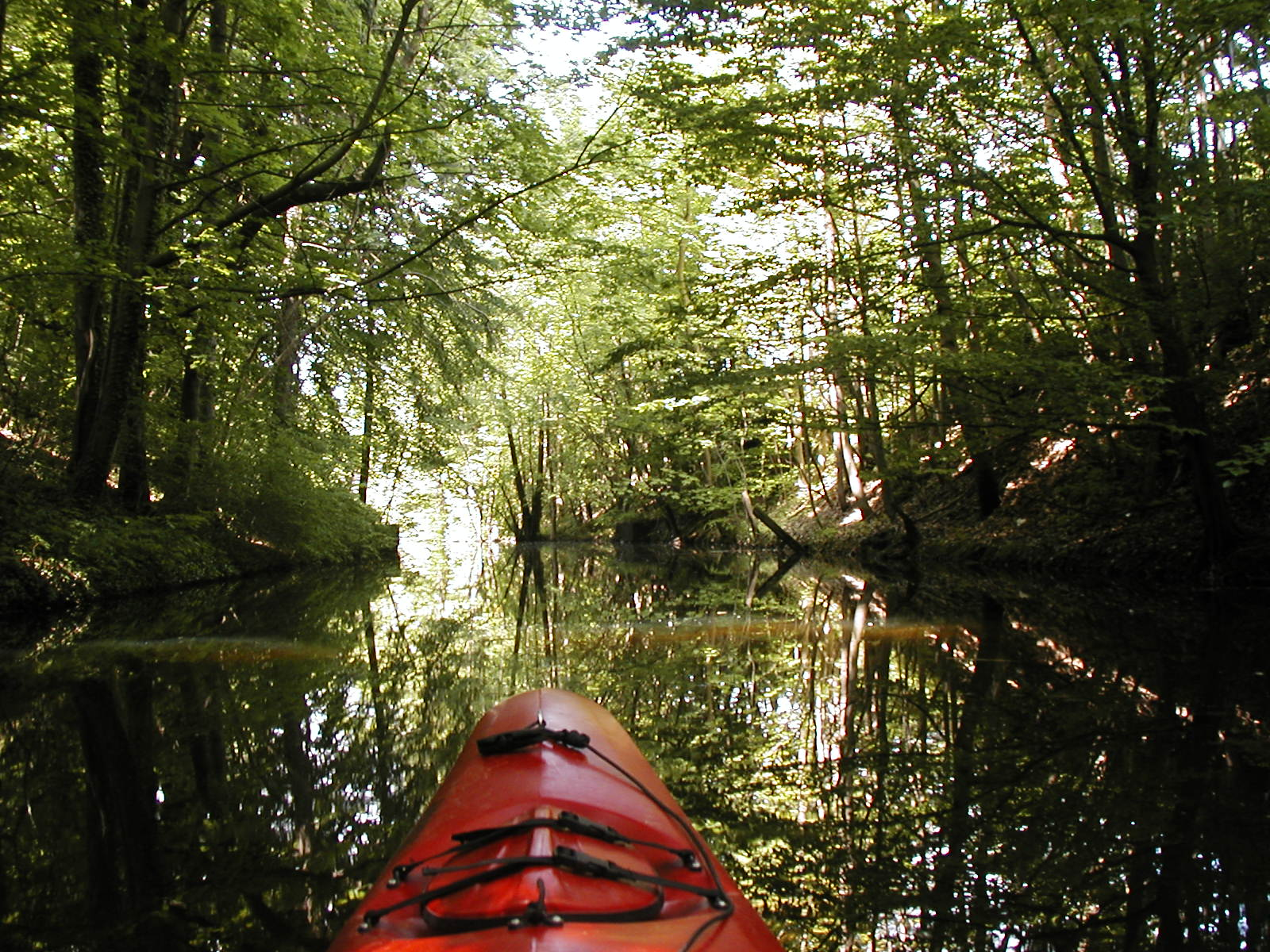
The Schwentine near Bad Malente

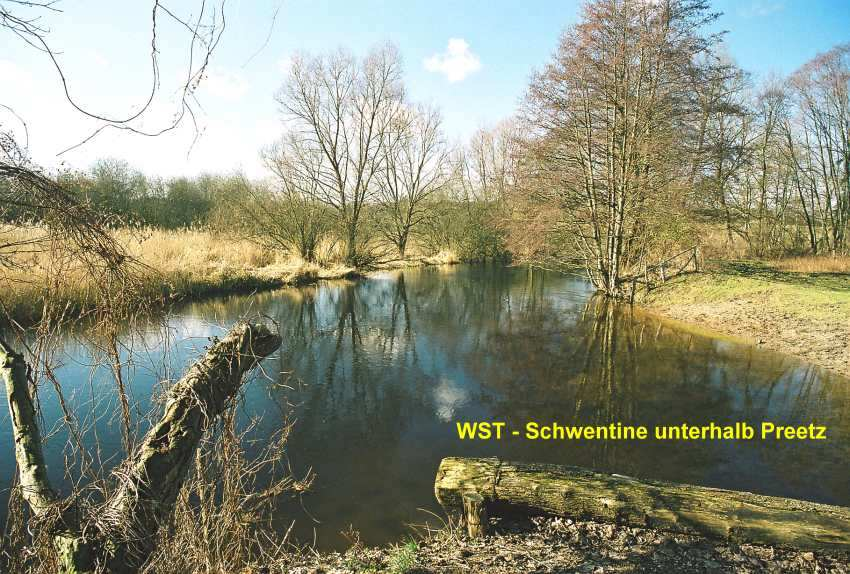
The Schwentine in the area between Preetz and the Rosensee near Raisdorf

== Course ==
List of lakes through which the Schwentine flows (in downstream order):

- Stendorfer See
- Sibbersdorfer See
- Großer Eutiner See
- Kellersee
- Dieksee
- Langensee
- Behler See
- Höftsee
- Großer Plöner See
- Stadtsee
- Schwanensee
- Kleiner Plöner See
- Kronsee
- Fuhlensee
- Lanker See
- Kirchsee
- Rosensee, a reservoir

== See also ==
- List of rivers of Schleswig-Holstein
