= Kasseedorf =

- Municipality
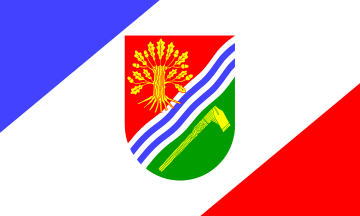
- Flag Coat of arms

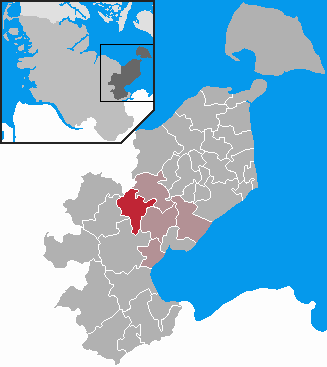
- Location of Kasseedorf within Ostholstein district
- Interactive map of Kasseedorf
- Location within Germany Location within Schleswig-Holstein
- Coordinates: 54°10′N 10°43′E
- Country: Germany
- State: Schleswig-Holstein
- District: Ostholstein
- Municipal assoc.: Ostholstein-Mitte

Government
  - Mayor: Niels Schwarz

Area
  - Total: 33.77 km^{2} (13.04 sq mi)
- Elevation: 37 m (121 ft)

Population (2025-12-31)
  - Total: 1,363
  - Density: 40.36/km^{2} (104.5/sq mi)
- Time zone: UTC+01:00 (CET)
  - Summer (DST): UTC+02:00 (CEST)
- Postal codes: 23717
- Dialling codes: 04521, 04528, 04529
- Vehicle registration: OH
- Website: www.amt-ostholstein- mitte.de

Kasseedorf is a municipality in the district of Ostholstein, in Schleswig-Holstein, Germany. West of the village is the lake of the Stendorfer See.
