= Kleiner Plöner See =

Lake in Germany

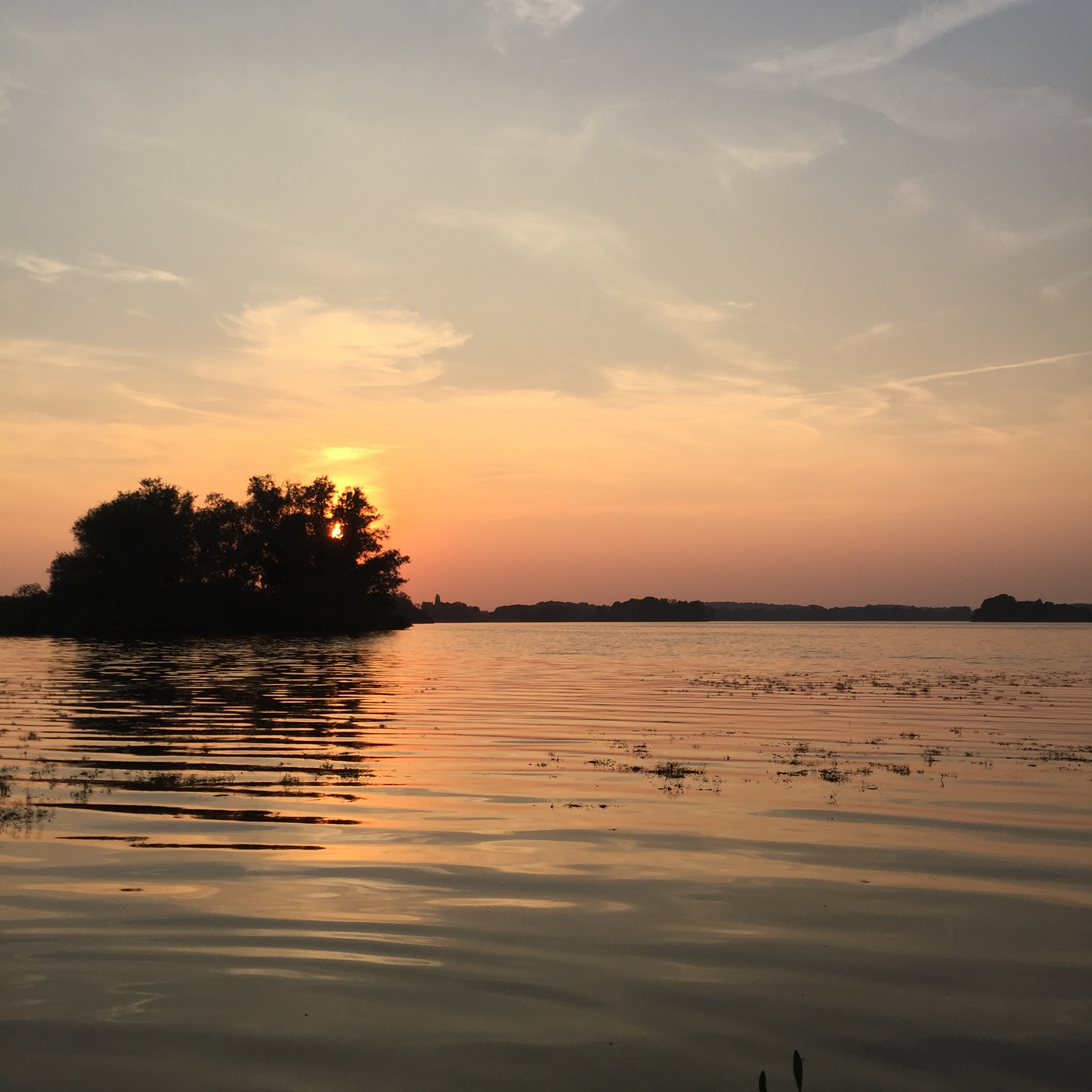
- Sunset at the Little Plön Lake

- Location within Schleswig-Holstein
- Location: Kreis Plön, Schleswig-Holstein
- Coordinates: 54°9′37″N 10°23′28″E
- Primary inflows: Schwentine
- Primary outflows: Schwentine
- Basin countries: Germany
- Surface area: 239 ha (590 acres)
- Average depth: 9 m (30 ft)
- Max. depth: 31.4 m (103 ft)
- Shore length^{1}: 112 km (70 mi)
- Surface elevation: 20 m (66 ft)
- Settlements: Plön
- ^{1} Shore length is not a well-defined measure.

The Kleine Plöner See is a lake in Holstein Switzerland in North Germany.

== Geography ==
It lies west of the town of the Plön, has an area of 239 hectares (590 acres), is up to about 31 metres deep and has a surface elevation of around 20 m above sea level (NN). The lake is owned both by the state of Schleswig-Holstein as well as various private individuals.

The weakly eutrophic lake lies on the River Schwentine, which enters in two places from the Großer Plöner See

- West of the Prinzeninsel, through the Rohrdommelbucht and the Mühlensee.
- Through the centre of Plöner, the Schwanensee and the Stadtsee.

== See also ==
- List of lakes in Schleswig-Holstein

== Sources ==
- Muuß, Uwe; Petersen, Marcus and König, Dietrich (1973). Die Binnengewässer Schleswig-Holsteins. 162 pp., numerous photos., Wachholtz-Verlag Neumünster. ISBN 3-529-05302-3
