= Ukleisee =

Lake in Germany

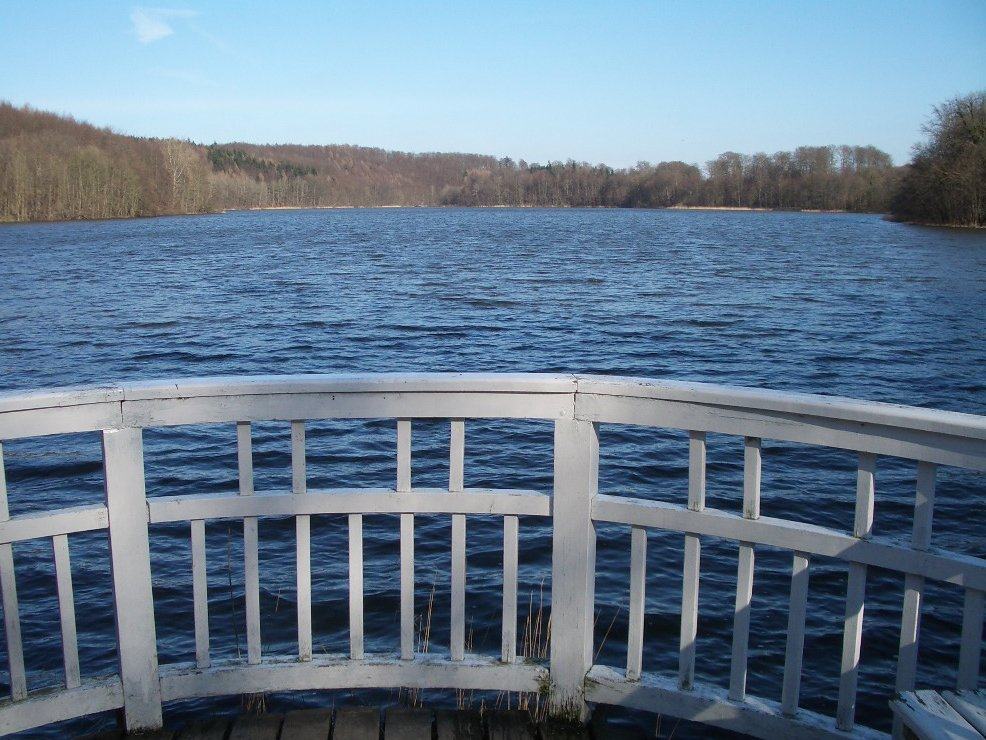

- Location within Schleswig-Holstein
- Location: Kreis Ostholstein, Schleswig-Holstein
- Coordinates: 54.18444°N 10.63717°E
- Primary inflows: Riekenbeke
- Primary outflows: Aue
- Basin countries: Germany
- Surface area: 0.32 km^{2} (0.12 sq mi)
- Average depth: 7.5 m (25 ft)
- Max. depth: 17.0 m (55.8 ft)
- Shore length^{1}: 3.0 km (1.9 mi)
- Surface elevation: 26.5 m (87 ft)
- ^{1} Shore length is not a well-defined measure.

Ukleisee is a lake in Kreis Ostholstein, Schleswig-Holstein, Germany. At an elevation of 26.5 m, its surface area is 0.32 km^{2}. This lake is (as numerous other lakes in this area) a kettle hole, remaining from Weichselian glaciation.
