= Preetz =

- Town
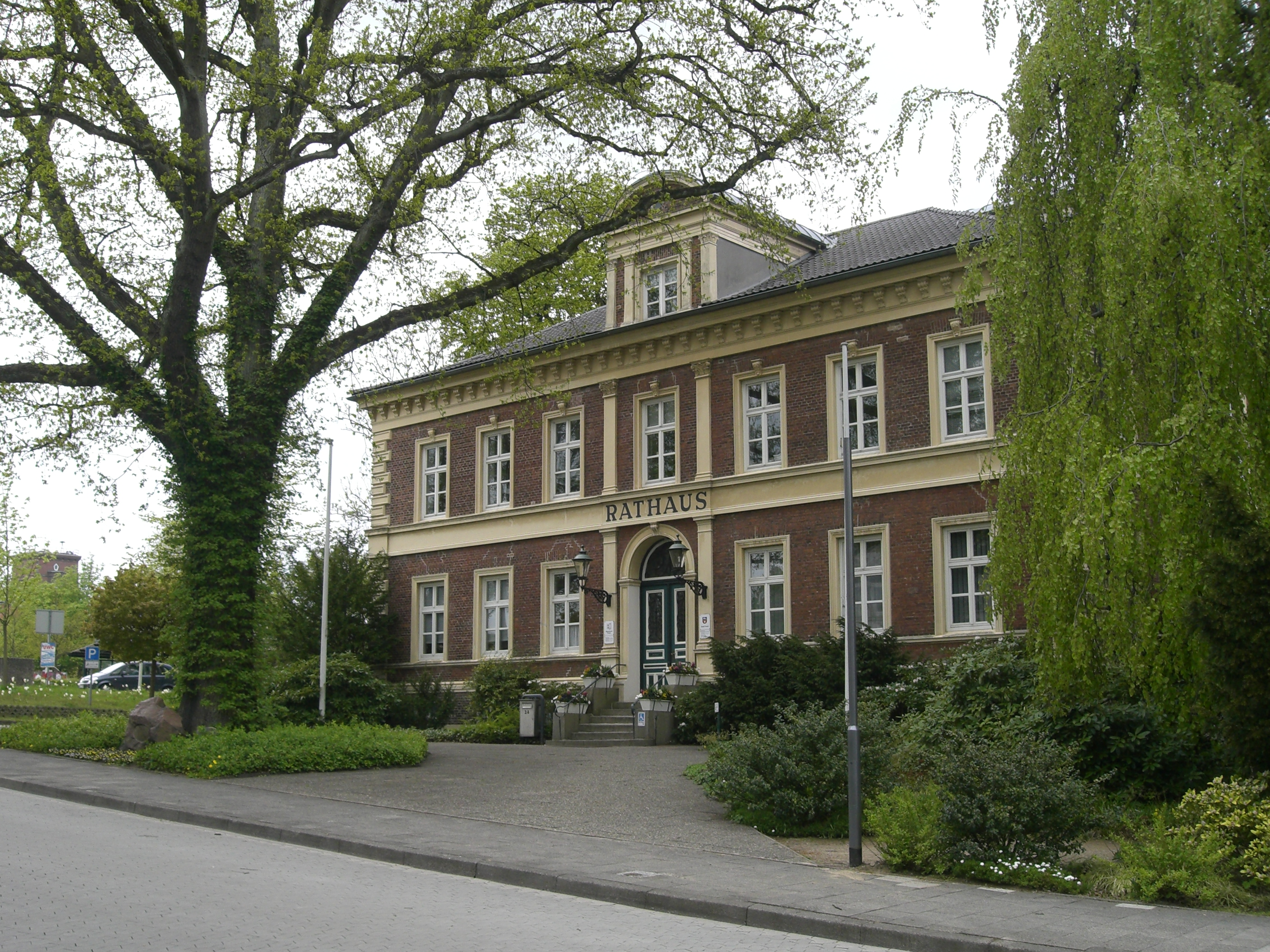
- Town hall

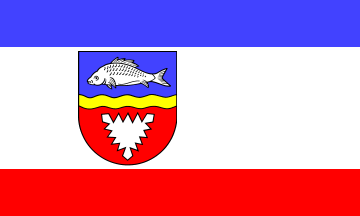
- Flag Coat of arms

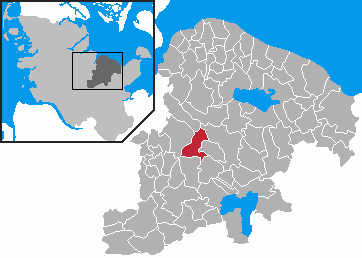
- Location of Preetz within Plön district
- Interactive map of Preetz
- Location within Germany Location within Schleswig-Holstein
- Coordinates: 54°14′12″N 10°16′56″E
- Country: Germany
- State: Schleswig-Holstein
- District: Plön

Government
  - Mayor: Björn Demmin (Ind.)

Area
  - Total: 14.4 km^{2} (5.6 sq mi)
- Elevation: 24 m (79 ft)

Population (2025-12-31)
  - Total: 16,464
  - Density: 1,140/km^{2} (2,960/sq mi)
- Time zone: UTC+01:00 (CET)
  - Summer (DST): UTC+02:00 (CEST)
- Postal codes: 24211
- Dialling codes: 04342
- Vehicle registration: PLÖ
- Website: preetz.de

Preetz (German pronunciation: [ˈpʁeːts]) is a town southeast of Kiel in the district of Plön, in Schleswig-Holstein, Northern Germany. Preetz is also known as "Schusterstadt" (English: 'shoemaker town') named after shoemakers who used to live and work in this town. Preetz has a population of about 16,000 and is the largest city in the district of Plön.

== Geography ==
Preetz is located in a hilly area referred to as the Holsteinische Schweiz (Holstein Switzerland) with a number of lakes and forests surrounding the town.

Lakes include the Postsee, Lanker See and the smaller Kirchsee in the centre of town, which forms part of the river Schwentine. There are multiple nature reserves around Preetz that attract tourists and locals alike for biking and hiking, especially in the summer months.

== History ==
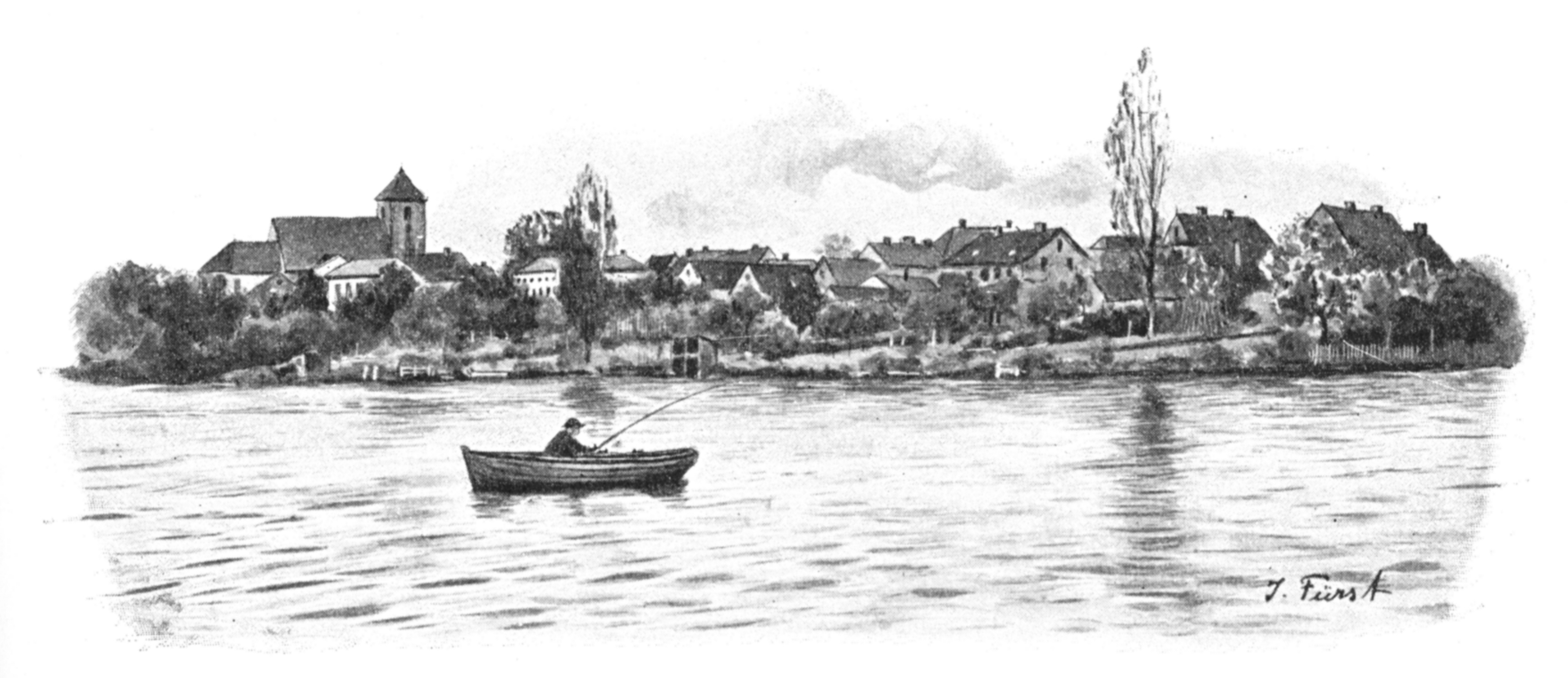
Preetz around 1895

The first mention of Preetz dates from the year 1185, when Ecbrecht Procensis writes about the location Poretz in the Versus de Vicelino. The origins of the name Preetz are said to be found in the Slavic term "po rece" (i.e., on the river). In 1221, the term "Poretzie" appeared, and in 1442 "Pretze".

A first town church was built in 1210. In 1211, Count Albrecht von Orlamünde established a Benedictine monastery: Preetz Priory. The foundation of the abbey was renewed by Adolf IV von Schauenburg in 1226, and it was given to nuns. In 1268, the nunnery church was built. The nunnery formed the highest administrative authority until 1867 and exercised jurisdiction as well.

Preetz obtained street lighting in 1852. The station was built in 1864, the Town Hall in 1871. An oak tree in front of the Town Hall, which was planted in 1871, still exists.

Limited town rights were awarded to Preetz on 17 May 1870, full town rights in 1901.

== Politics ==
=== Mayors ===
- 1946–1946: Paul Schön
- 1946–1959: Max Grothe
- 1959–1971: Heinrich Niendorf
- 1971–1982: Bendix Herrmann
- 1982–1991: Claus Feddersen
- 1992–1999: Walter Riecken
- 1999–2015: Wolfgang Schneider
- since 2015: Björn Demmin

=== Coat of arms ===
The fish in the top part is meant to show the past's principal source of food. Displayed is a Percidae. This kind of fish is known for its defensive traits and is meant to show the defensive traits the population of Preetz has.

=== Twin towns ===
Preetz is twinned with:

- Blandford Forum, United Kingdom
- Stavenhagen, Germany
- Tapa, Estonia
- Neman, Russia

== Notable people ==
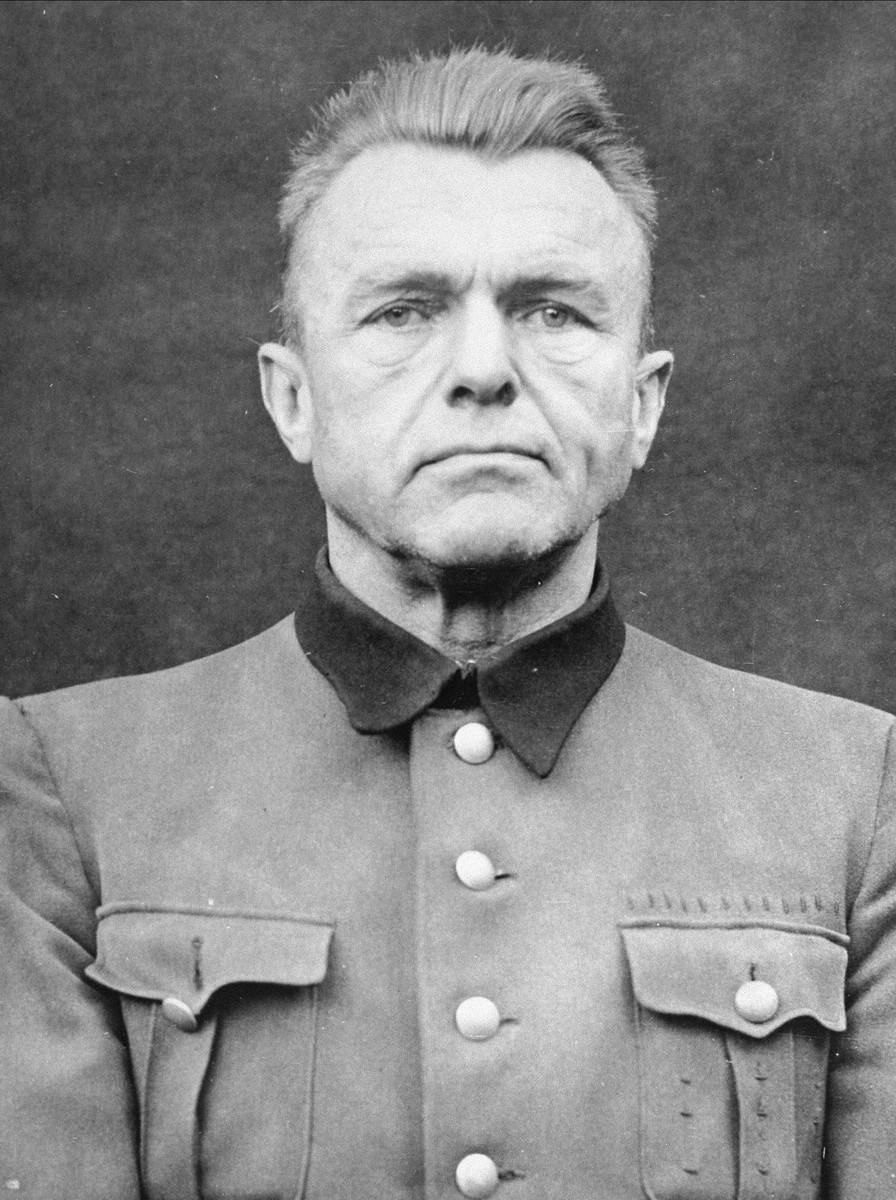
Karl August Genzken (1946/1947)

- Karl Genzken (1885-1957), physician, SS group leader and chief of the medical office of the Waffen-SS
- Otto Armster (1891-1957), intelligence service officer and resistance fighter (Personalities of 20 July 1944 plot)
- Hans Hermann Junge (1914-1944), SS-officer, valet to Adolf Hitler, husband of Traudl Junge
- Rolf Rendtorff (1925-2014), Protestant theologian and university lecturer
- Thilo von Westernhagen (1950–2014), composer and pianist.
- Sabine Christiansen (born 1957), journalist
- Allison Mack (born 1982), American actress, known from the cult NXIVM
- Steffen Uliczka (born 1984), 3000 meter obstacle runner
- Carola Rackete (born 1988), ship captain, working for Sea-Watch, arrested in Italy in 2019
- Ole Werner (born 1988) football coach and manager of Bundesliga side RB Leipzig
- Lasse Petersdotter (born 1990), politician (The Greens)
