= Malente =

- Municipality
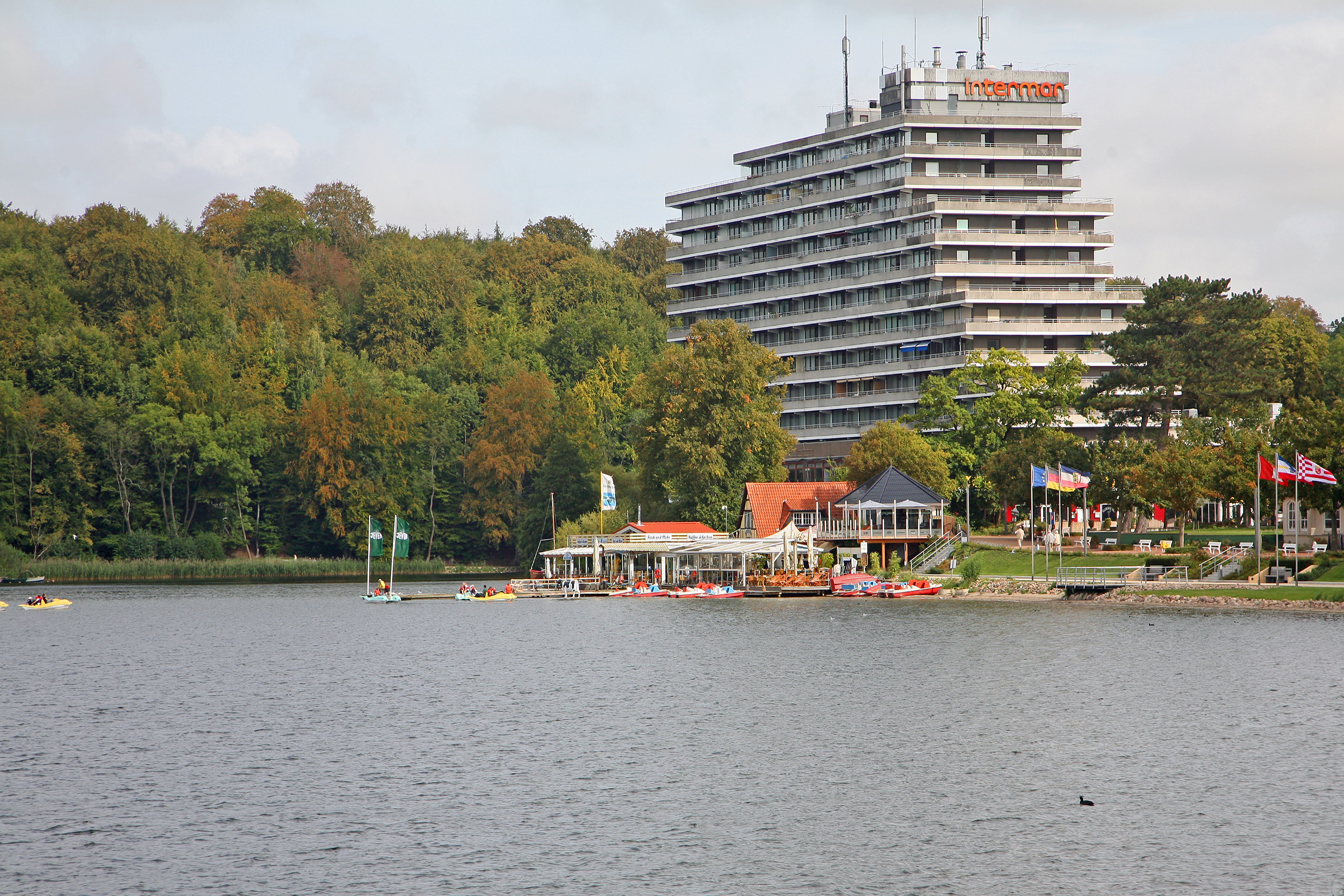
- Dieksee-Promenade in Malente

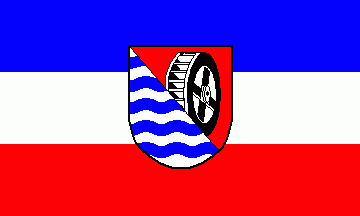
- Flag Coat of arms

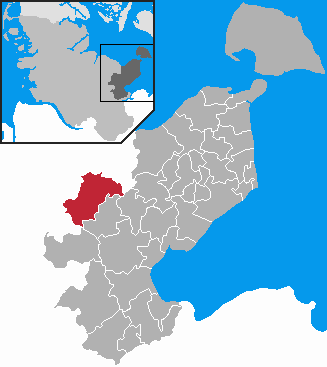
- Location of Malente within Ostholstein district
- Interactive map of Malente
- Location within Germany Location within Schleswig-Holstein
- Coordinates: 54°10′N 10°33′E
- Country: Germany
- State: Schleswig-Holstein
- District: Ostholstein
- Subdivisions: 12

Government
  - Mayor: Heiko Godow (CDU)

Area
  - Total: 69.06 km^{2} (26.66 sq mi)
- Elevation: 32 m (105 ft)

Population (2025-12-31)
  - Total: 10,842
  - Density: 157.0/km^{2} (406.6/sq mi)
- Time zone: UTC+01:00 (CET)
  - Summer (DST): UTC+02:00 (CEST)
- Postal codes: 23714
- Dialling codes: 04523
- Vehicle registration: OH
- Website: www.malente.de

Malente is a municipality in the district of Ostholstein, in Schleswig-Holstein, Germany. It is about 5 km northwest of Eutin and 35 km north of Lübeck.

The cities belonging to this municipality are Timmdorf, Kreuzfeld, Neukirchen, Sieversdorf, Krummsee, Malkwitz, Nüchel, Benz, Rachut, Neversfelde and Söhren.

== Geography ==
Malente, or Bad Malente Gremsmühlen is a Municipality in Ostholstein, Germany, consisting of Bad Malente, Gremsmühlen, Rachut and Neversfelde.

However, the municipality/community itself has Timmdorf, Kreuzfeld, Neukirchen, Sieversdorf, Krummsee, Malkwitz, Nüchel, Benz and Söhren partaking in it as well.

== Notable people born in Malente ==
- Sigrid Jahns, professor of history at LMU Munich.
- Holger B. Deising (* 1956), agricultural scientist
- Carl Jacobsen (1910–1985), last district administrator of Rendsburg district and first district administrator of Rendsburg-Eckernförde district
- Malente, DJ and music producer
