= Utin =

Utin may refer to:

- Utin (castle), a former Wendish castle in north Germany
- Saint-Utin, a commune in north-eastern France
- Ikouwem Udo Utin (born 1999), Nigerian football player

== See also ==
- Utina (disambiguation)
