= Monopteros =

Type of structure

Schematic plan of a monopteros

A monopteros (Ancient Greek: ὁ μονόπτερος, from: μόνος, 'only, single, alone', and τὸ πτερόν, 'wing'), also called a monopteron or cyclostyle, is a circular colonnade supporting a roof but without any walls. Unlike a tholos (in its wider sense as a circular building), it does not have walls making a cella or room inside. In Greek and especially Roman antiquity, the term could also be used for a tholos. In ancient times, monopteroi (Ancient Greek: οἱ μονόπτεροι) served among other things as a form of baldachin for a cult image. An example of this is the Monument of Lysicrates in Athens, albeit with the spaces between the columns being walled in, even in ancient times. The Temple of Roma and Augustus on the Athenian Acropolis is a monopteros from Roman times, with open spaces between the columns.

Monopteroi were popular garden features in English- and French-style gardens, often given classical names such as "muses' temple". Many wells in parks and spa centres are covered by a monopteros. Many monopteroi have staffage structures like a porticus placed in front of the monopteros. These also have only a decorative function, because they are not needed in order to provide an entrance to a temple that is open on all sides.

Many monopteroi are described as rotundas due to their circular floor plan. The tholos also goes by that name. However, many monopteroi have square or polygonal plans, and these would not be described as rotundas. An example is the Muses' Temple with the muse, Polyhymnia, in the grounds of Tiefurt House, that has a hexagonal floor plan.

== Examples ==
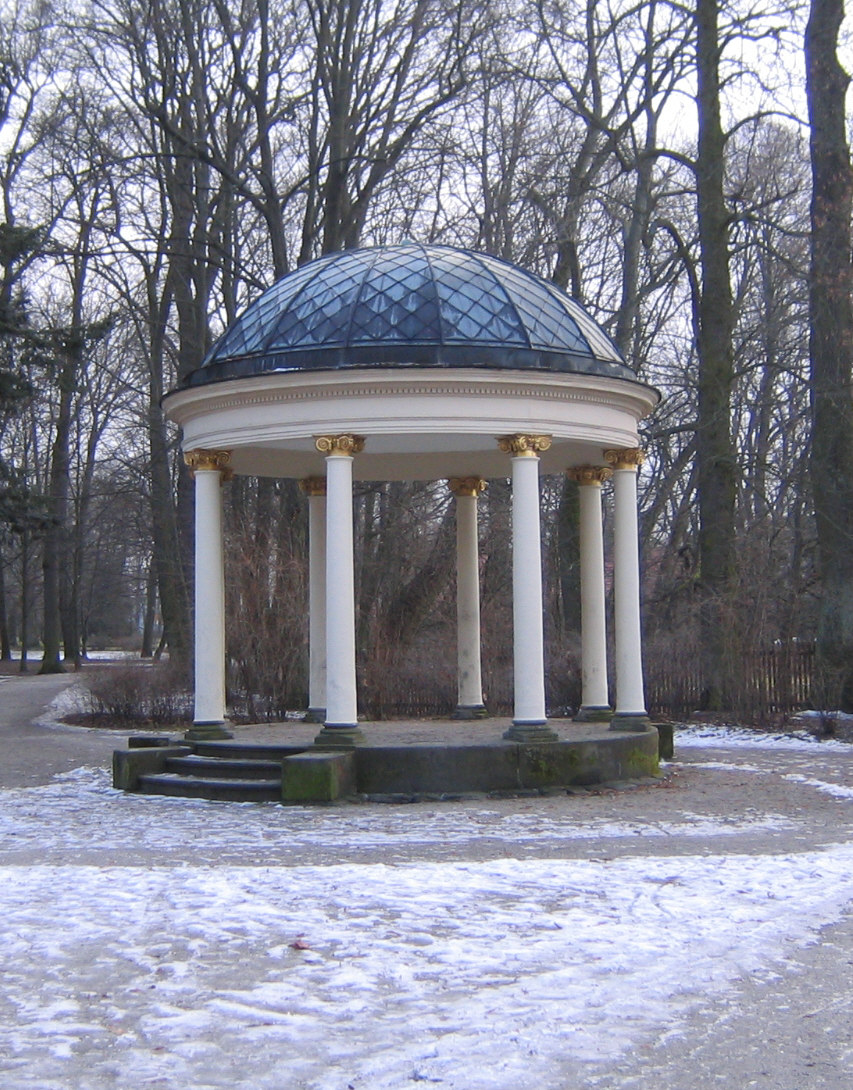
The pavilion in the Court Garden of the New Palace, Bayreuth, Bavaria, Germany

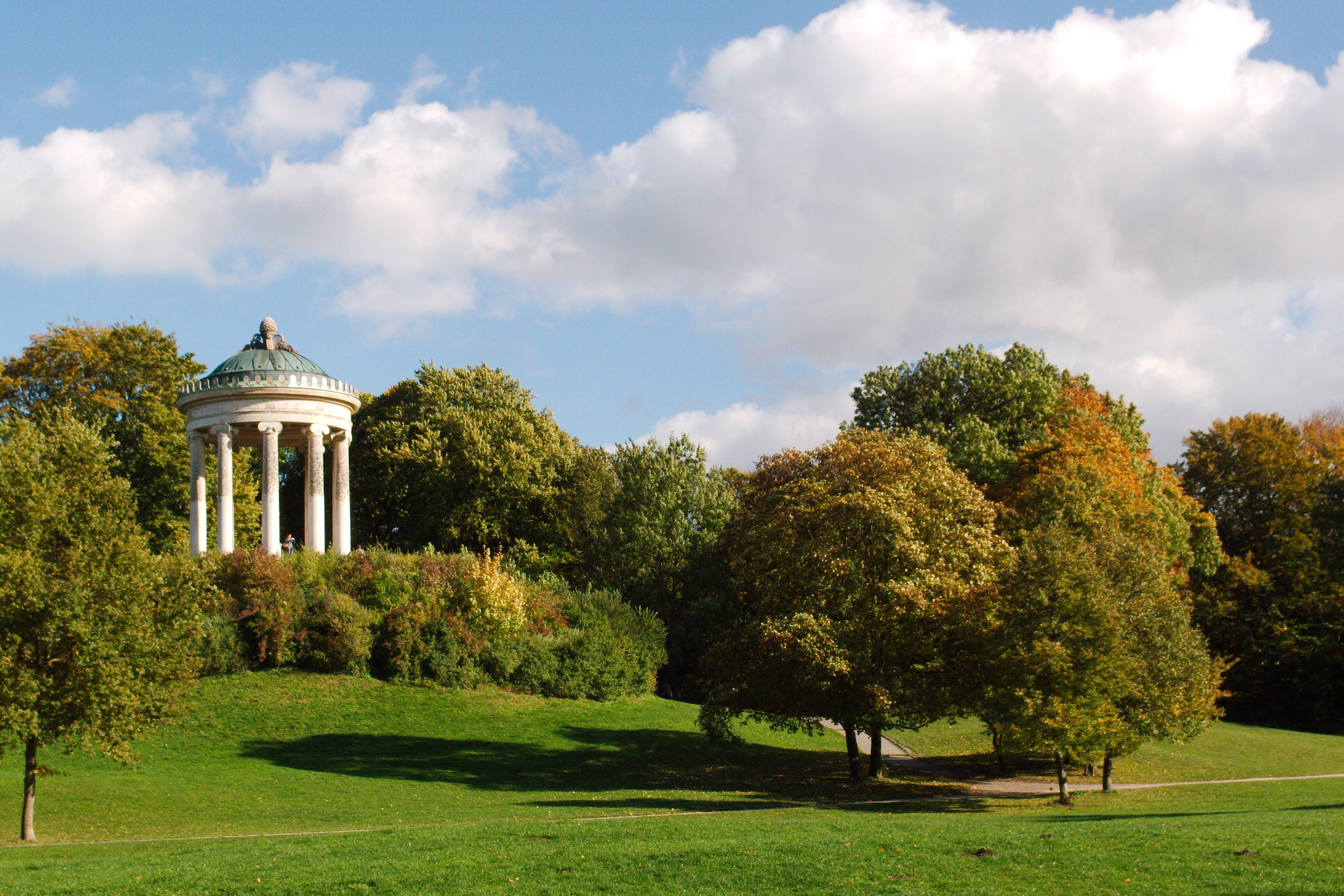
The monopteros in the English Garden, Munich, Germany

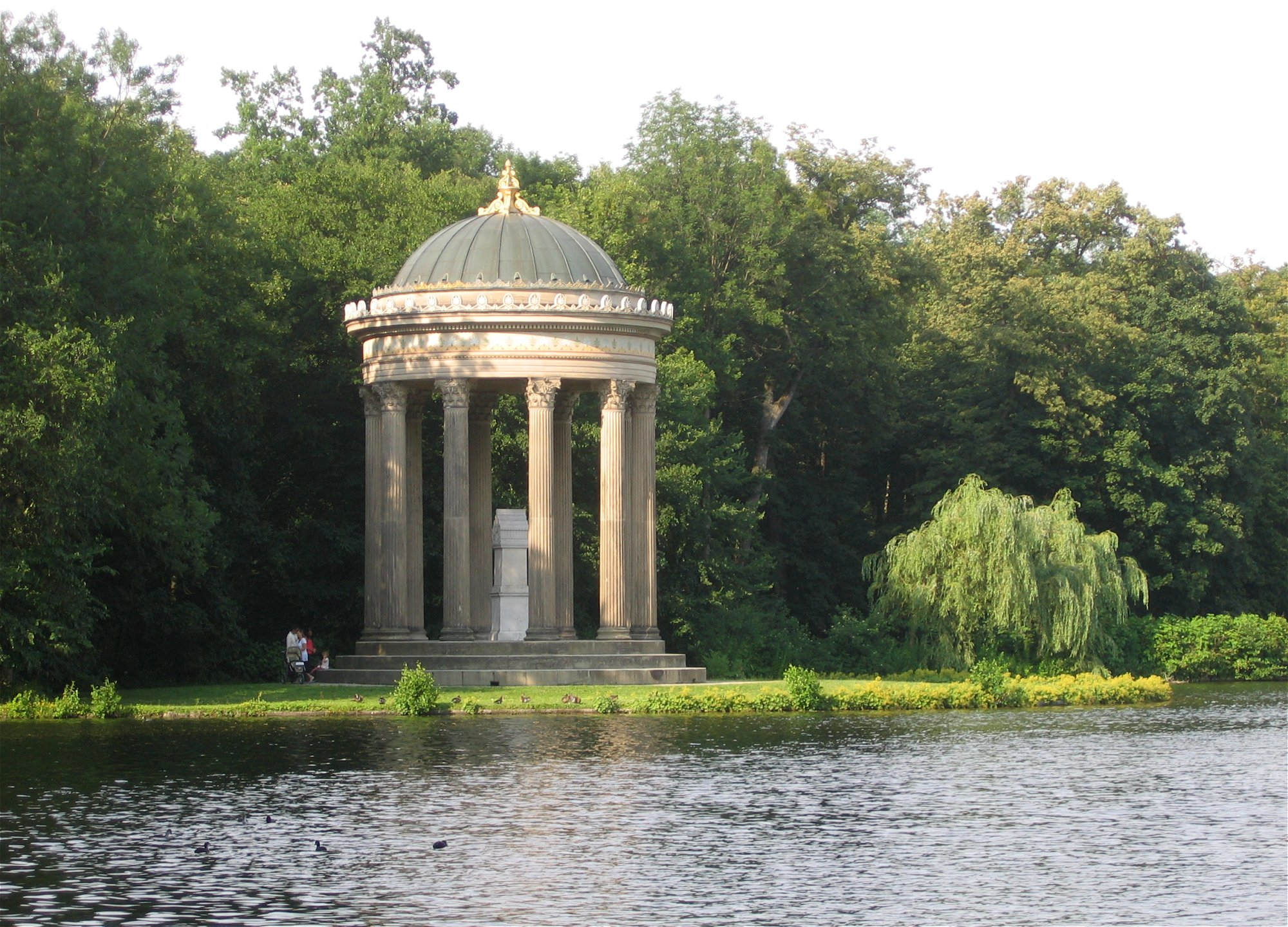
The Apollo Temple in the Nymphenburg Castle Park, Munich, Germany

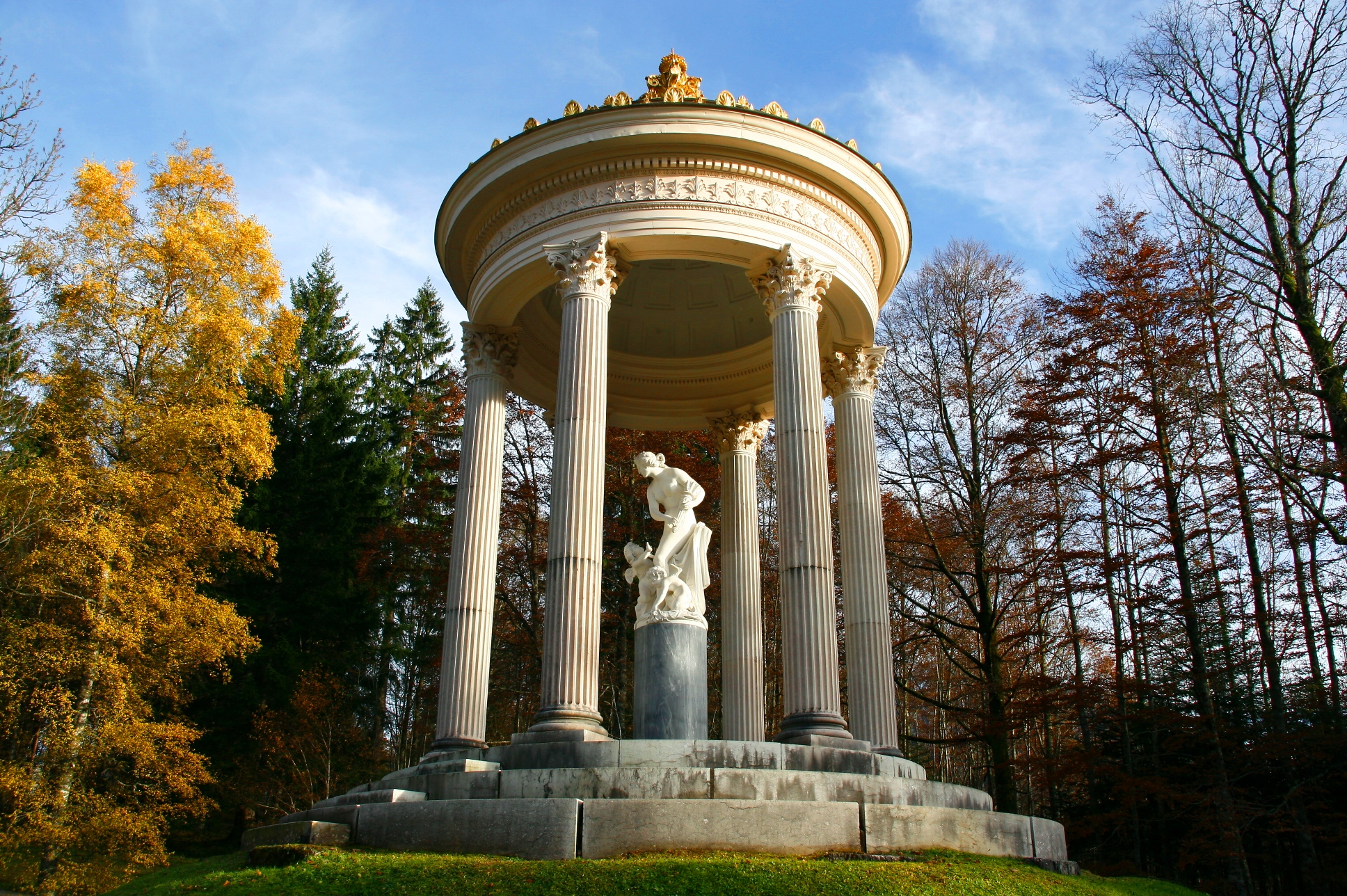
The Venus Temple at the Linderhof Palace, Bavaria, Germany

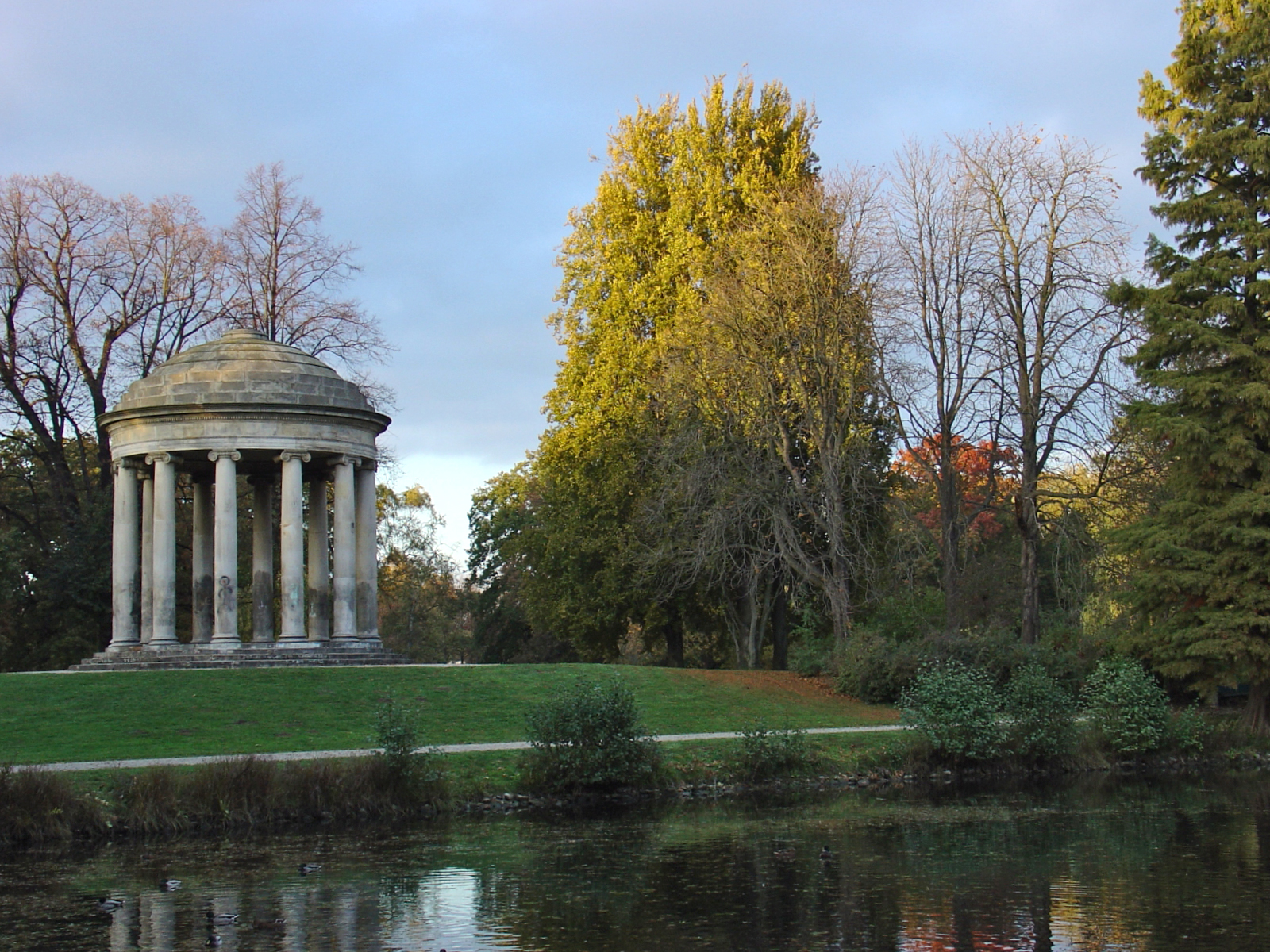
The Leibniz Temple in the Georgengarten, Hanover, Germany

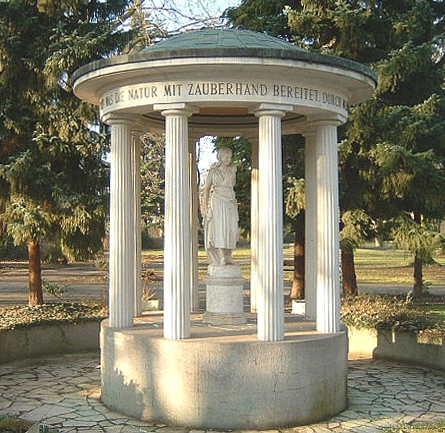
Well temple in the spa park at Bad Vilbel, Germany

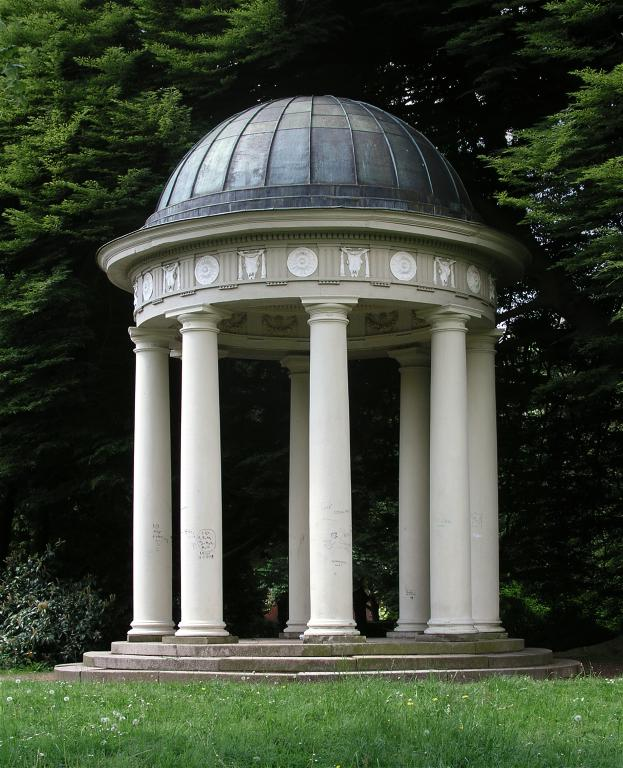
Monopteros in the castle park at Eutin Castle (by C. F. Hansen, 1796)

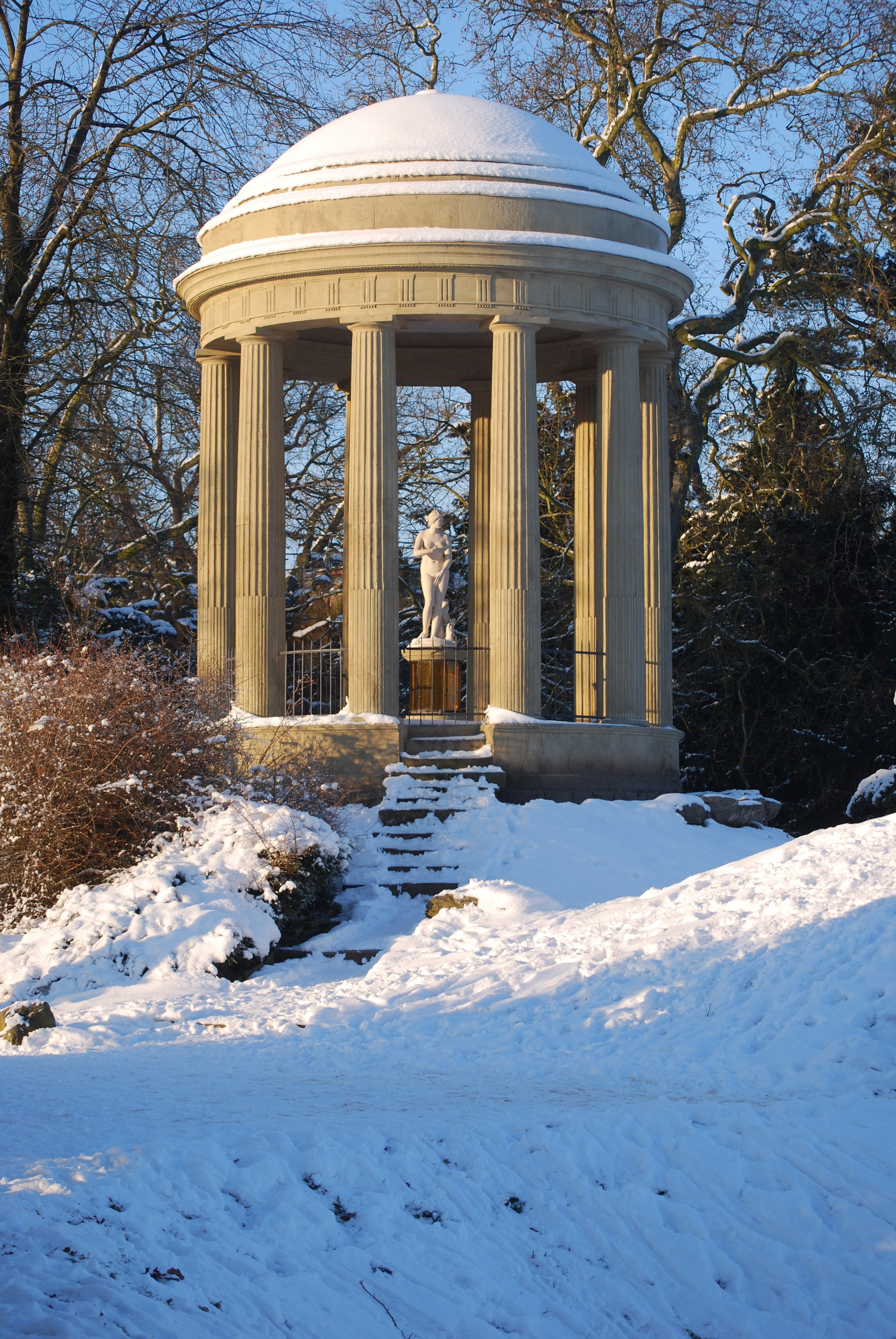
Venus Temple in the Wörlitzer Park, Germany

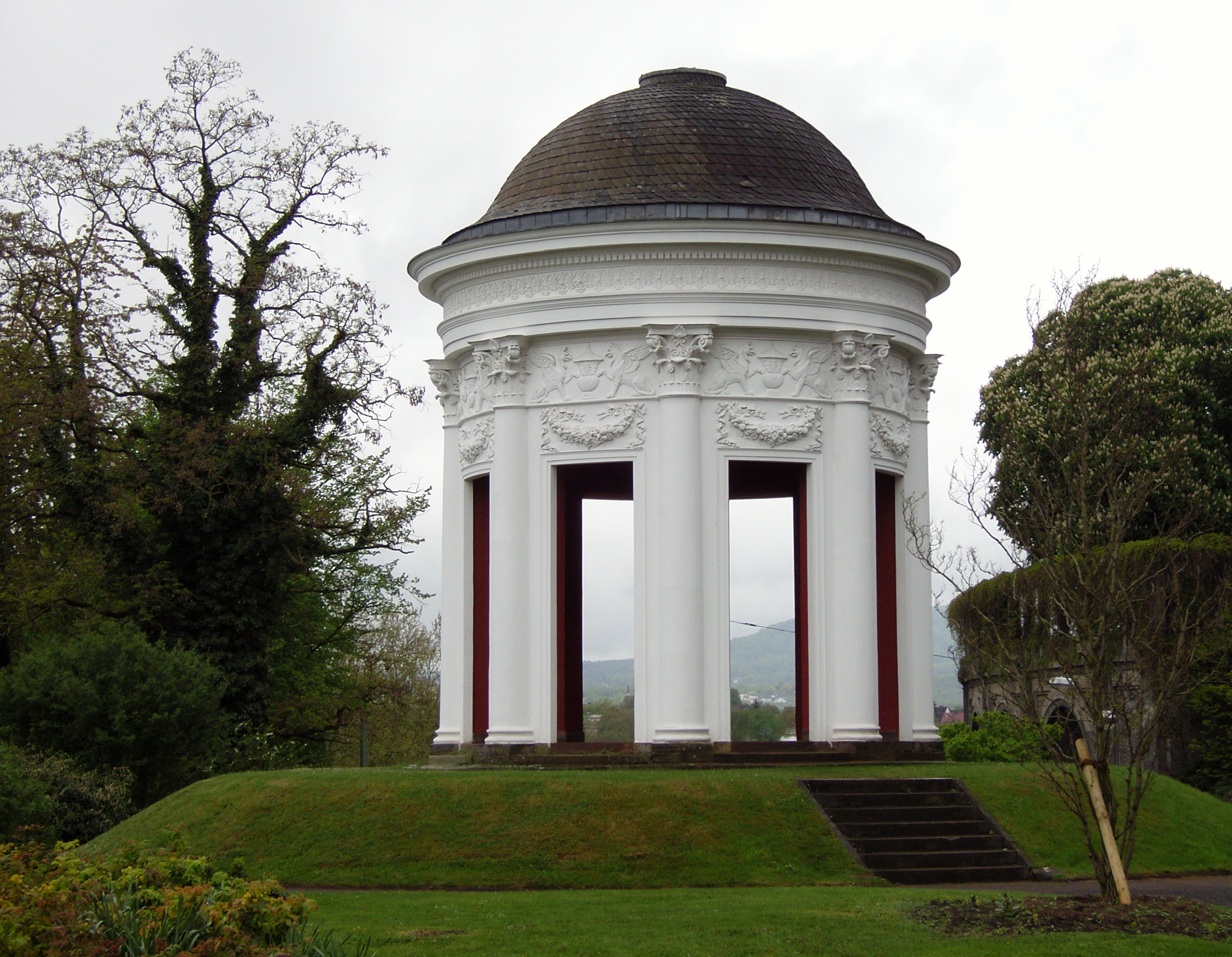
The Breakfast Pavilion (Frühstückspavillon) in Kassel, Germany

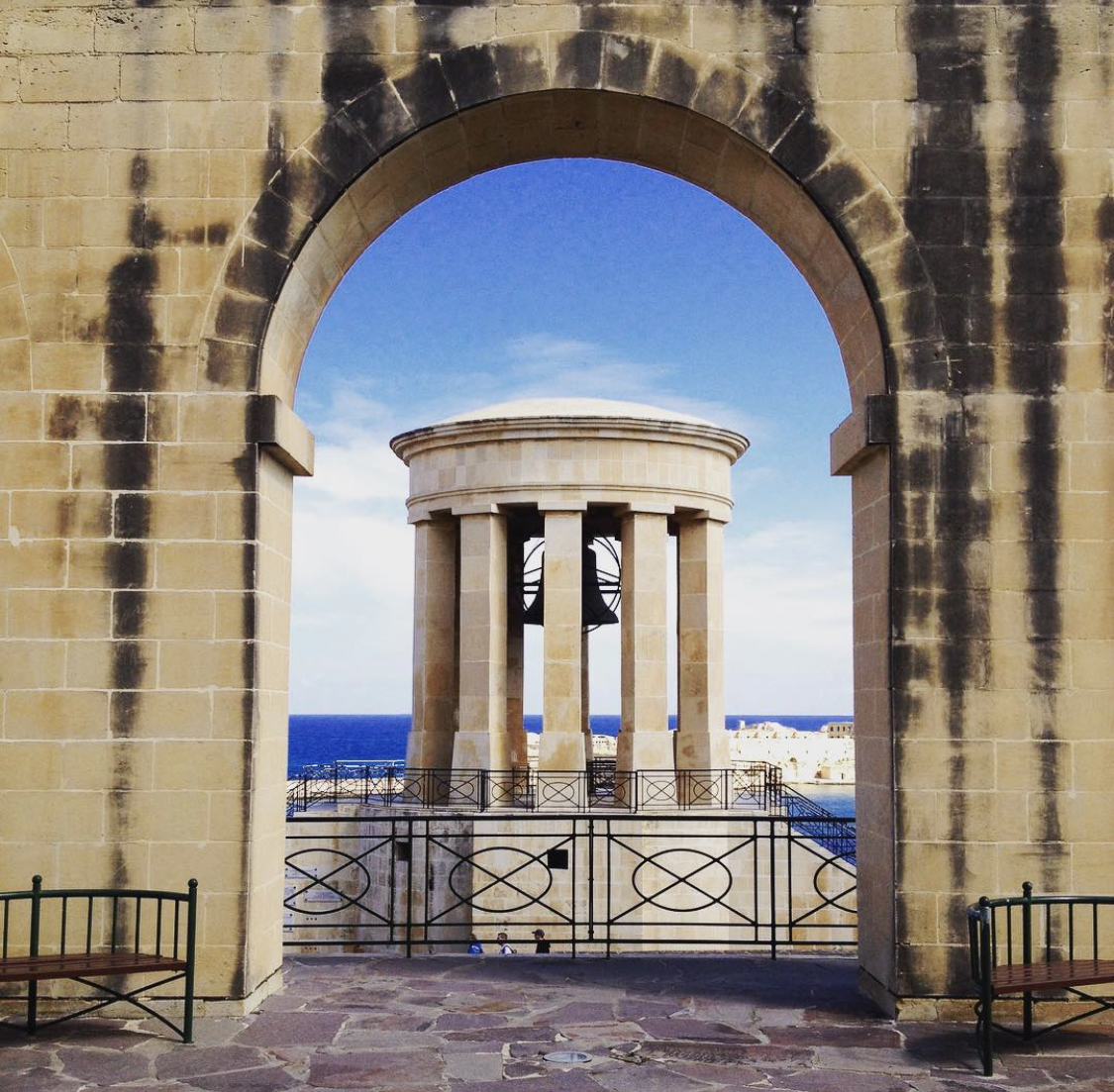
The Siege Bell Memorial in Valletta, Malta

Wilhelm Eugen Temple, palace park in Pokój, Poland

== See also ==
- Belvedere (structure)
- Eyecatchers
- Gazebo
- Aedicule, often not free-standing
- Baldachin (canopy)
- Ciborium (canopy)
- Cupola, on top of a dome

== Literature ==
- Wolfgang Binder: Der Roma-Augustus Monopteros auf der Akropolis in Athen und sein typologischer Ort. Karlsruhe 1969.
- Ingrid Weibezahn: Geschichte und Funktion des Monopteros. Untersuchungen zu einem Gebäudetyp des Spätbarock und des Klassizismus. Hildesheim 1975. ISBN 3-487-05764-6. Online: (Google Books).
