= Eutin =

- Town
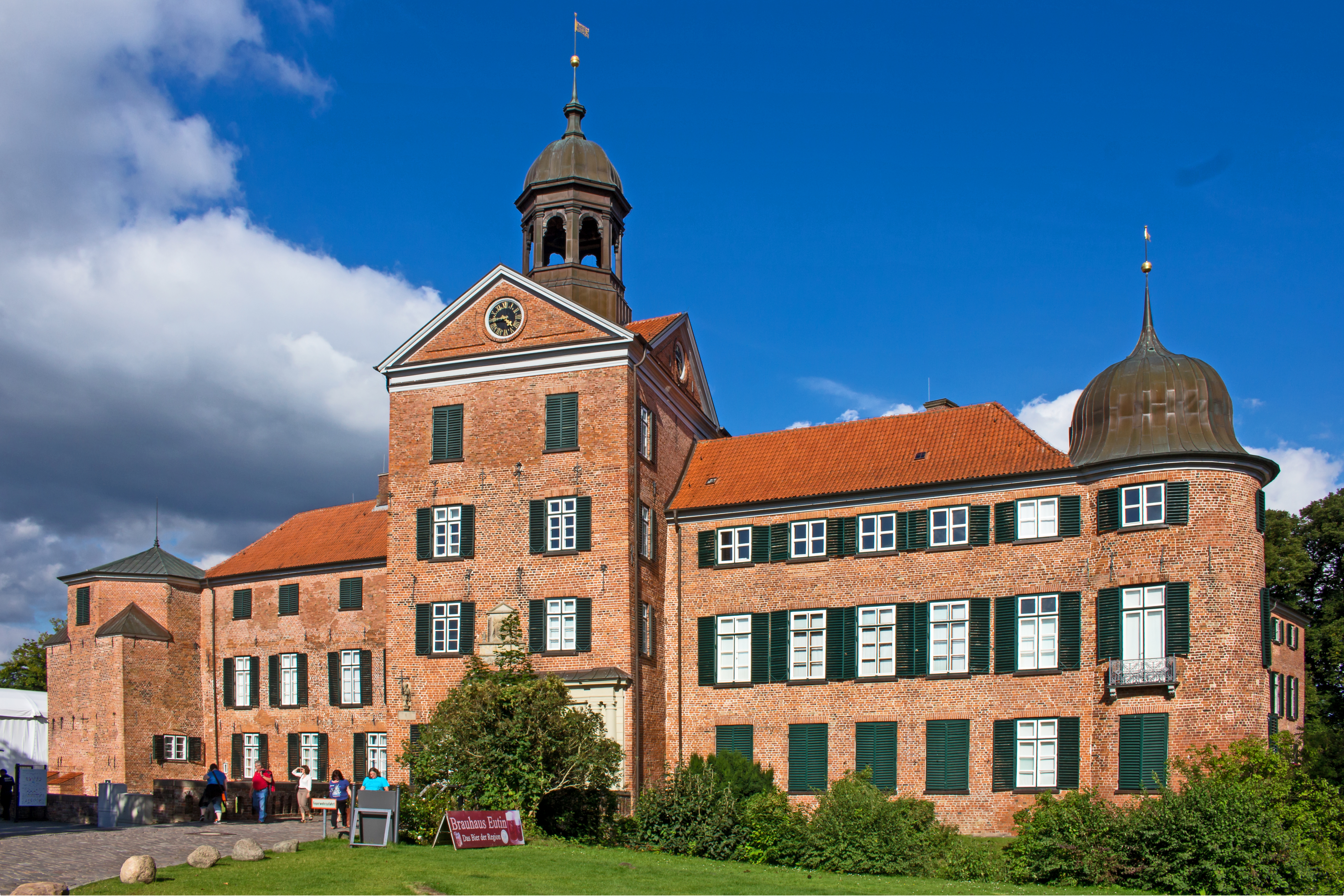
- Eutin Castle

- Flag Coat of arms

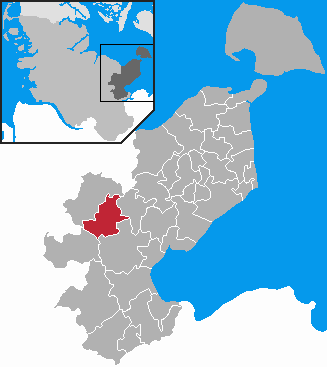
- Location of Eutin within Ostholstein district
- Interactive map of Eutin
- Location within Germany Location within Schleswig-Holstein
- Coordinates: 54°8′16″N 10°37′5″E
- Country: Germany
- State: Schleswig-Holstein
- District: Ostholstein

Government
  - Mayor: Carsten Behnk (Ind.)

Area
  - Total: 41.39 km^{2} (15.98 sq mi)
- Elevation: 33 m (108 ft)

Population (2025-12-31)
  - Total: 17,177
  - Density: 415.0/km^{2} (1,075/sq mi)
- Time zone: UTC+01:00 (CET)
  - Summer (DST): UTC+02:00 (CEST)
- Postal codes: 23701
- Dialling codes: 04521
- Vehicle registration: OH
- Website: www.eutin.de

Eutin (German pronunciation: [ɔʏˈtiːn]) is the district capital of Eastern Holstein county located in the northern German state of Schleswig-Holstein. As of December 2022, the town had some 17,000 inhabitants.

== History ==
The name Eutin (originally Utin) is of Slavic origin. Its meaning is not quite clear; it is probably derived from the personal name "Uta". The Slavic Obotrites tribe settled eastern Holstein in the 7th/8th centuries A.D. and built a castle on Pheasant Island in the lake now called the Großer Eutiner See.

The originally Slavonic settlement of Utin was populated in the twelfth century by Dutch settlers. In 1156 Eutin became a market town. Town rights were granted in the year 1257. It later became the seat of the Prince-Bishopric of Lübeck, as Lübeck itself was an imperial free city. When the bishopric was secularized in 1803, Eutin became part of the Duchy of Oldenburg. As a result of the Greater Hamburg Act of 1937, Eutin passed from the Free State of Oldenburg to the Prussian Province of Schleswig-Holstein. After World War II, it became part of the modern Bundesland of Schleswig-Holstein.

== Culture ==
Eutin is birthplace of composer Carl Maria von Weber. To honor him, an open-air theater (Freilichtbühne) was built in the park of Eutin Castle in 1951, and operas are performed there in July and August during the Eutin Opera Summer Festival (Eutiner Festspiele). The seating capacity of this open-air venue is about 2000. The festival includes music students in Eutin as well as students from the University of Kansas in Lawrence, Kansas, US, which is the twin city of Eutin.

Eutin hosts an annual Blues Festival (Bluesfest Eutin) at the beginning of summer. Local musicians, as well as up and coming blues artists from around the world, come to play at this three-day outdoor blues festival, which takes place in the market place in the center of town. As the costs are covered by sponsoring, public funding and volunteer helpers, admission is free.

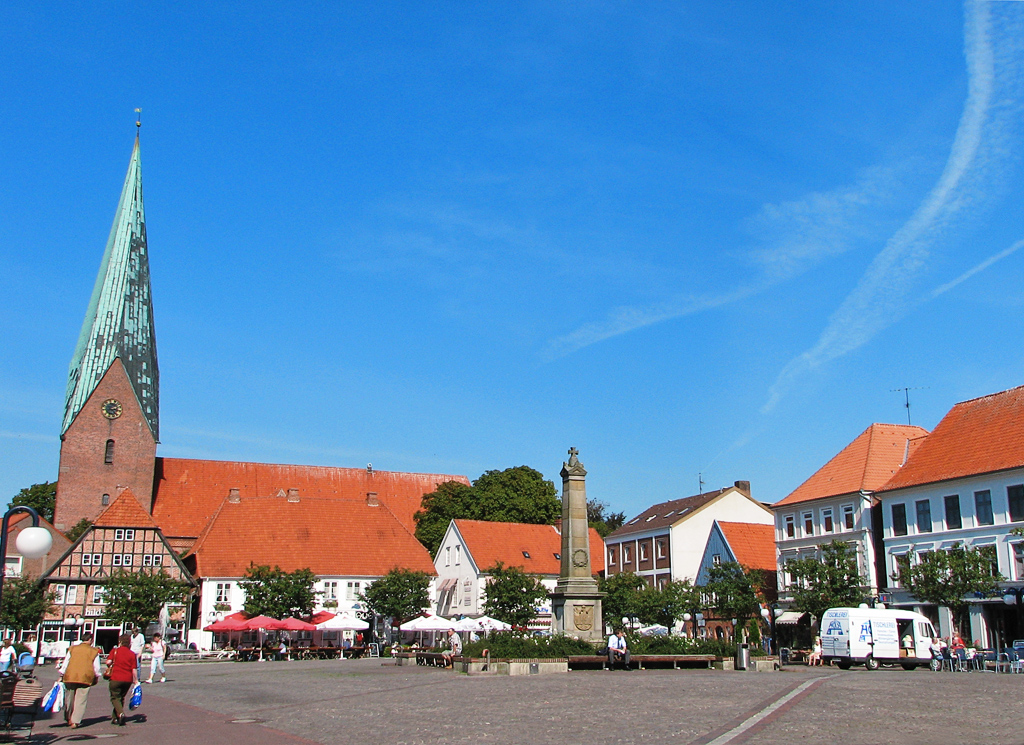
Eutin central market place 'Marktplatz'

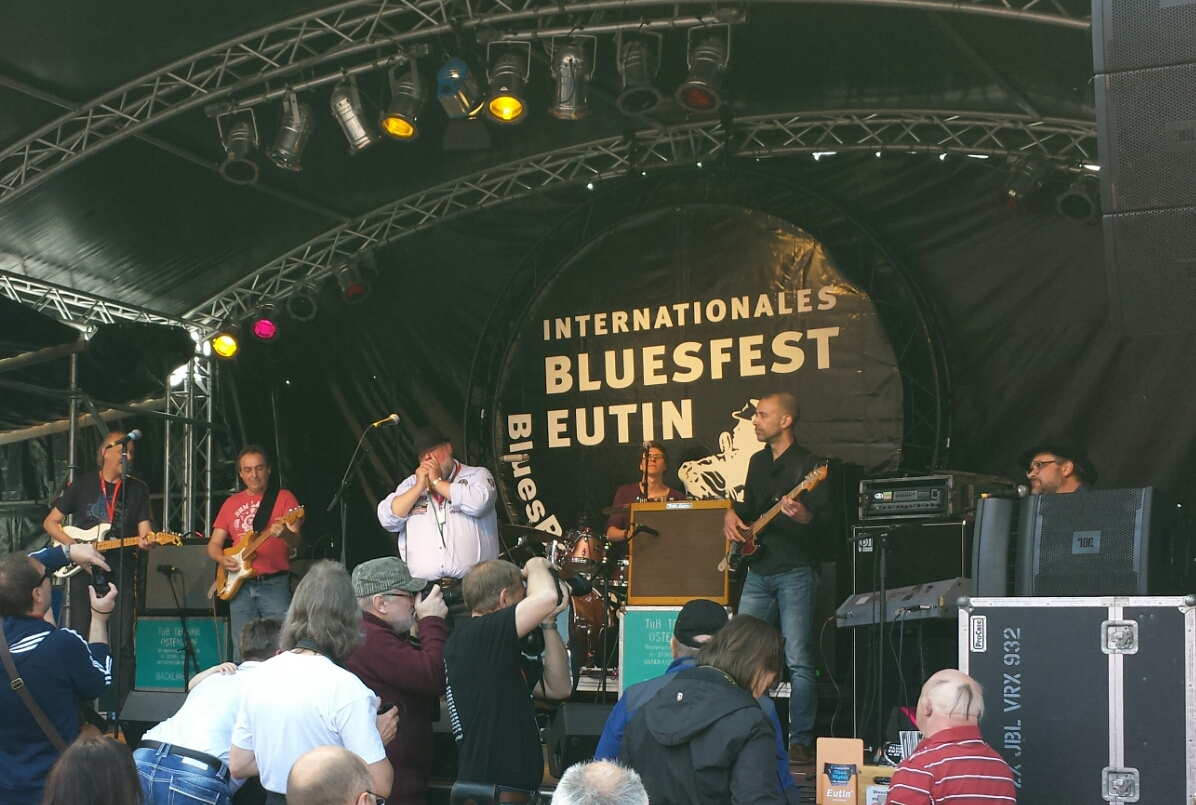
Eutin All Time Stars, BluesBaltica/Bluesfest 2014

== Geography and economy ==
Eutin is surrounded by a number of lakes of the Holsteinische Schweiz, including the Großer Eutiner See, Kleiner Eutiner See, Kellersee and Ukleisee. Many of the lakes are surrounded by forests. Popular activities on these lakes include boating, canoeing, rowing, swimming, and fishing.

Schleswig-Holstein, particularly Eutin, is known for its numerous rapeseed fields, which are used for biofuel production. Wind turbines are also a common sight in this rural region.

== Historic buildings ==
Originally constructed as a fully functioning windmill in 1850 by Carl Friedrich Trahn, Die alte Mühle (the old mill) now serves as a bar and restaurant.

== Notable People from Eutin ==
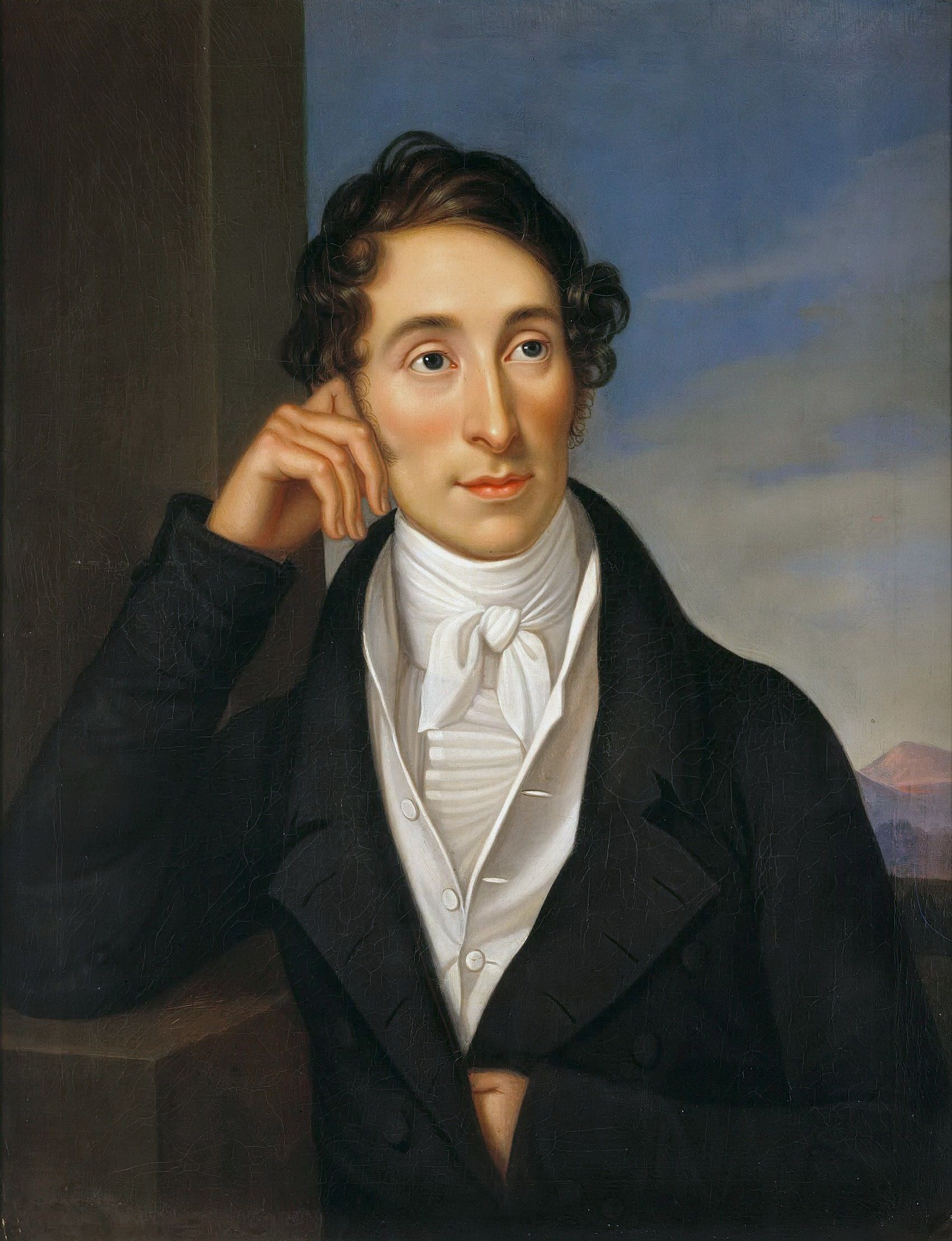
Carl Maria von Weber, 1821

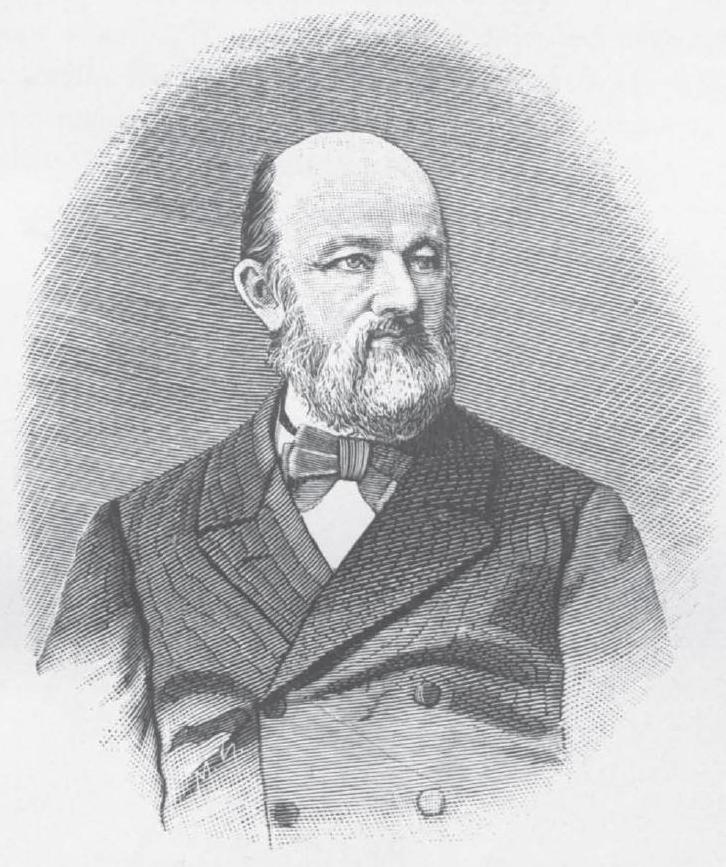
Johann Friedrich Julius Schmidt, 1884

- Nicholas Mercator, (1620–1697), mathematician, born in Eutin or near Cismar.
- Wilhelm, Duke of Oldenburg (1754 in Eutin Castle – 1823), a ruling Duke of Oldenburg from 1784
- Hedvig Elisabeth Charlotte of Holstein-Gottorp (1759 – 1818), Queen of Sweden and Norway
- Friedrich August Ukert (1780–1851), historian, geographer, librarian
- Carl Maria von Weber (1786–1826), composer.
- Friedrich Adolf Trendelenburg (1802–1872), philosopher.
- Peter Friedrich Ludwig Tischbein (1813–1883), German chief forester, entomologist and paleontologist
- Johann Friedrich Julius Schmidt (1825–1884), astronomer and geologist.
- Heinrich Limpricht (1827–1909), chemist
- Adolf Pansch (1841–1887), anatomist, anthropologist and polar explorer
- Wilhelm Dittmann (1874–1954), politician (USPD / SPD)
- Friedrich Kühn (1889–1944), officer, most recently General of the Panzertruppe
- Peter Thoms (born 1940), actor and jazz musician
- Vadim Glowna (1941–2012), actor and film director.
- Axel Prahl (born 1960), film actor and musician.
- Daniel Richter (born 1962), artist of large-scale oil paintings.
- Ralph Schumacher (born 1964), philosopher and behavioral scientist
- Tom Buk-Swienty (born 1966) historian, journalist, writer and author,
- Ulf Kämpfer (born 1972), politician (SPD), Lord Mayor in Kiel
- Jonathan Stock (born 1983), journalist and staff writer for Der Spiegel magazine
- Wincent Weiss (born 1993), singer

=== Sport ===
- Christian Klees (born 1968), 1996 Summer Olympics gold medallist in sport shooting
- Dirk von Zitzewitz (born 1968), racing driver
- Lars Unger (born 1972), former footballer, played 252 pro games

== Other people who worked in Eutin ==
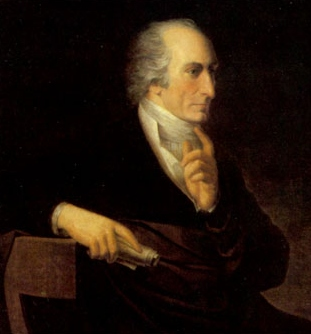
Friedrich Heinrich Jacobi 1801

- Matthias Claudius (1740–1815), poet
- Emanuel Geibel (1815–1884), lyricist
- Lotte Herrlich (1883–1956), (nude) photographer
- Friedrich Heinrich Jacobi (1743–1819), philosopher and writer
- Johann Heinrich Voss (1751–1826), classicist and poet.
- Johann Wilhelm Petersen (1649–1727), theologian
- Hans-Heinrich Sievert (1909–1963), athlete and Olympic athlete
- Johann Heinrich Wilhelm Tischbein (1751–1829), painter
- Ferdinand Tönnies (1855–1936), sociologist, lived from 1901 to 1921 in the Auguststraße 8 (now Albert-Mahlstedt-Straße)
- Wilhelm Wisser (1843–1935), high school professor and oral researcher

== Twin towns – sister cities ==
Eutin is twinned with:

- Guldborgsund, Denmark
- Lawrence, United States
- Putbus, Germany

Each summer, Lawrence and Eutin take part in an exchange program, where high-school students from Lawrence and college students from the University of Kansas have some weeks in Eutin, while German students from Eutin come to Lawrence to study. The University of Kansas also has established an internship exchange program with Eutin.

== Language ==
In addition to Standard German (Hochdeutsch), Low German (Plattdeutsch) is very commonly used in Eutin. A common greeting among the citizens is "moin", to which one replies with "moin moin".

== See also ==
- Utin (castle)
- Bridegroom's Oak
