= Pammenes =

Pammenes may refer to:

- Pammenes of Thebes (fl. fourth century BC), Theban general
- Pammenes of Marathon (fl. first century BC), Athenian statesman
- Pammenes (astrologer) (fl. first century AD), Greek astrologer associated with the Roman politician Publius Anteius Rufus
