= Temple of Roma and Augustus =

Greek monopteral circular Ionic temple

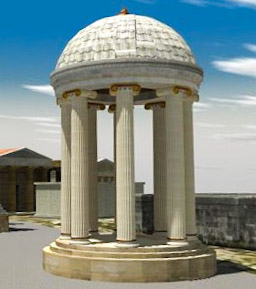
Digital reconstruction of the Temple of Roma and Augustus on the Acropolis.

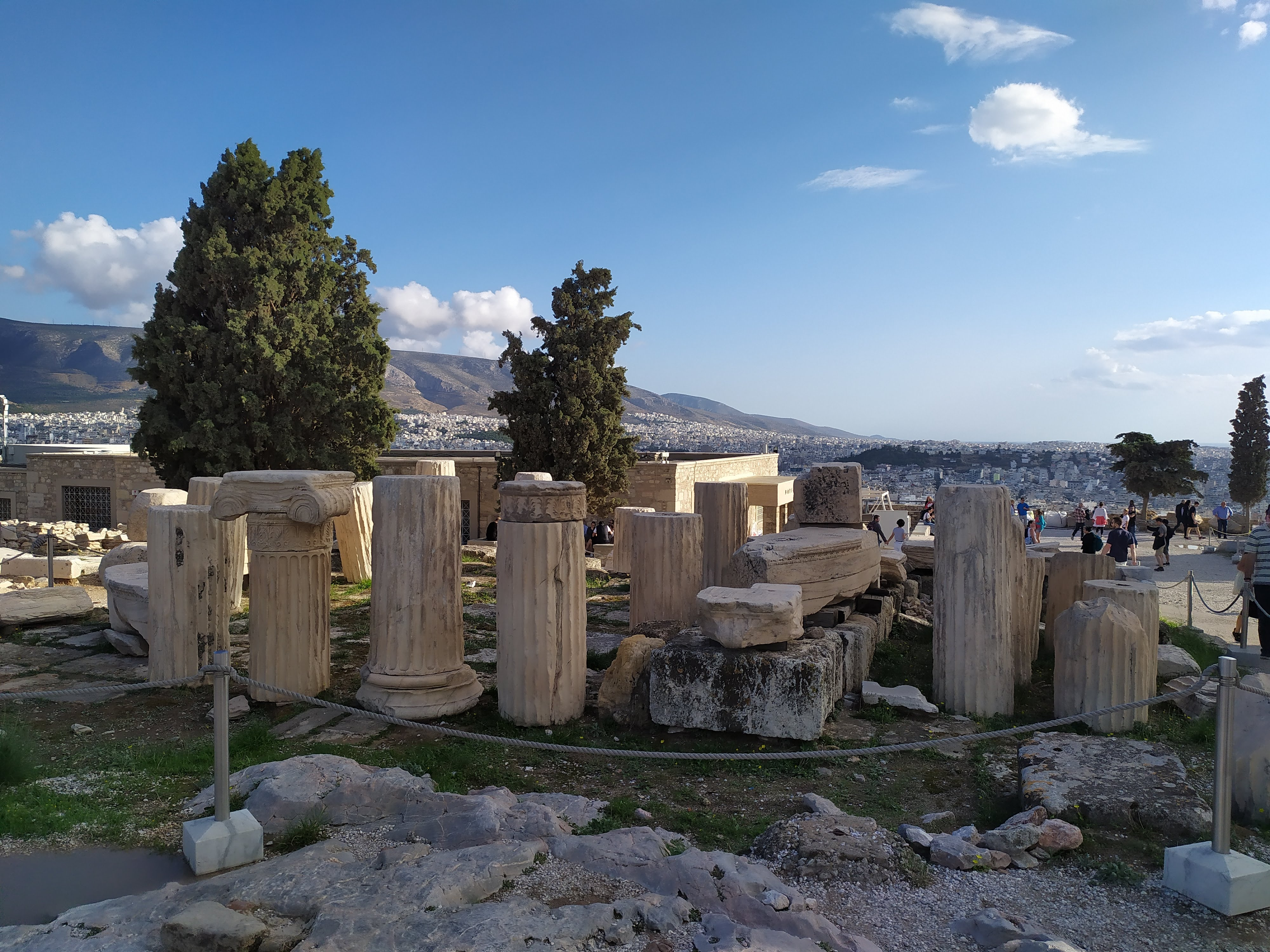
Remains of the temple on the Acropolis

The Temple of Roma and Augustus was a monopteral circular Ionic temple built on the Acropolis of Athens c. 19 BCE, likely coincident with Augustus' second visit to Athens. The structure was axially aligned with the eastern entrance of the Parthenon, placed 23 m (75 ft) eastward. The temple, which asserted the divinity of Rome and the Imperial cult in the context of the religious centre of the Acropolis, was a propaganda monument erected at a time of tension between Rome and Athens. Its ruins remain on the Acropolis.

== Description ==
The Pentelic marble temple was at its greatest diameter 8.6 m (28 ft), and likely measured 7.36 m (24.1 ft) in height. The building had one step and a stylobate on which its nine columns stood. It had no interior wall, making it a monopteros, and might have been the frame or setting for a statue or other cult object. In style it recalls the columns of the Erechtheion with elaborately carved floral motifs at the top of the shaft, making it an early example of the Roman classicizing Neo-Attic style. The inscribed epistyle was over the central intercolumniation which was slightly wider than the others and evidently faced east. The building had a sloping conical marble roof. A large square foundation, with sides of 11–12 m (36–39 ft), has been preserved and it was investigated by Kavadias and Kawerau in the course of the excavations of 1885–1890. From then on it has been the consensus view that this was the foundation for the temple. The foundation consists of two courses of large tuff blocks deriving from another, older building. The construction apparently coincided with the repair of the west side of the Erechtheion, since a geison block from there was found built into the foundations of the circular temple. An inscription in an archaizing pseudo-stoichedon style on the architrave reads:

The People (dedicated this temple) to the Goddess Roma and [[Augustus Caesar]], when the hoplite general was Pammenes, son of Zenon, of Marathon, priest of the Goddess Roma and Augustus Soter on the Acropolis, when the priestess of Athena Polias was Megiste, daughter of Asklepiades of Halai, in the archonship of Areios, son of Dorion, of Paiania.

— IG II^{3} 4, 10

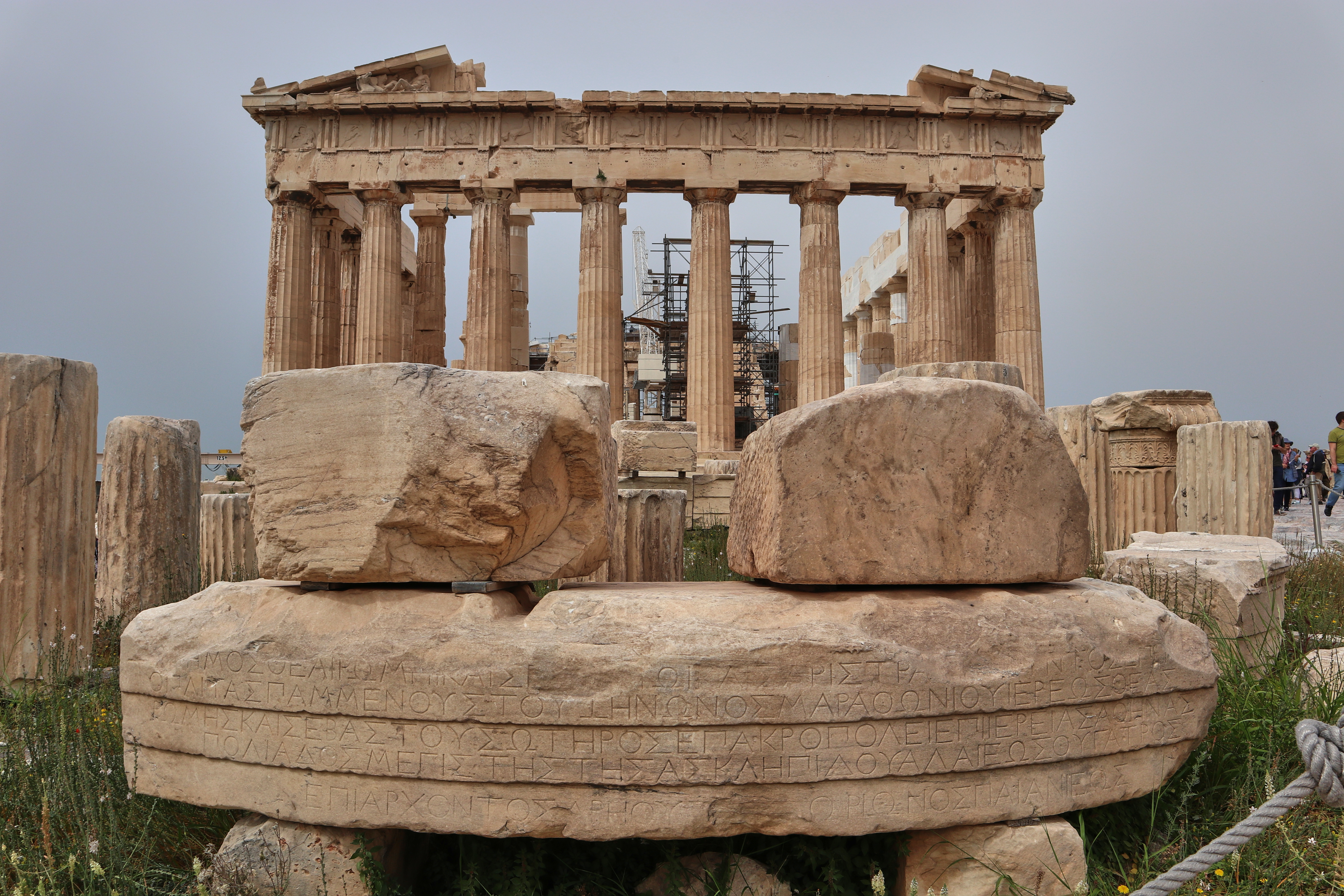
Inscribed architrave of the Temple of Roma and Augustus, in front of the Parthenon.

Dio Cassius states that in the winter of 22–21 BCE, Augustus visited Athens, at which time the statue of Athena in the Parthenon, which usually faced eastward, turned west, and spat blood in Rome's direction. This implies an evident hostility on the part of Athens toward Augustus, when the city had previously sided with Antony in the Civil War. It was not until Augustus’ second visit, after his diplomatic victory over Parthia, when he participated in the Eleusinian rites, that relations must have sufficiently thawed for the exchange of honours.

Placing the monument on the Acropolis, then, signalled Athenian willingness to embrace the Imperial cult and the Augustan regime. The meaning of the location of the temple may have further significance, however. Either its placement in the "field of victory" could signify the Athenian attempt to contextualise Roman power in the long span of Greek martial achievement, and thereby subtly subordinate it. Or its creation along with a programme of contemporary public works represented evidence of the enthusiastic romanisation of the city.

== Bibliography ==
- Arafat, K.W. (1996). Pausanias' Greece, Ancient artists and Roman rulers. Cambridge University Press.
- Camp, J. (2001). The Archaeology of Athens. Yale University Press.
- Hoff, M. (1996). "The politics and architecture of the Athenian imperial cult". In Foss, P.; Humphrey, J.H. (eds.). Subject and Ruler: The Cult of the Ruling Power in Classical Antiquity. Journal of Roman Archaeology Supplement. 17. pp. 185–200.
- Spawforth, T. (1997). "The Early Reception of the Imperial Cult in Athens: Problems and Ambiguities". In Hoff, M. C.; Rotroff, S. I. (eds.). The Romanization of Athens: Proceedings of an International Conference held at Lincoln, Nebraska (April 1996). Oxbow Monograph 94. pp. 183–202.
- Spawforth, A. (2012). Greece and the Augustan cultural revolution. Cambridge University Press.
- Whittaker, H. (2002). "Some Reflections on the Temple to the Goddess Roma and Augustus on the Acropolis at Athens". In Ostenfeld, E.N. (ed.). Greek Romans and Roman Greeks: Studies in Cultural Interaction. Aarhus University Press. pp. 25–39.
