= Bridegroom's Oak =

Oak tree in Schleswig-Holstein, Germany

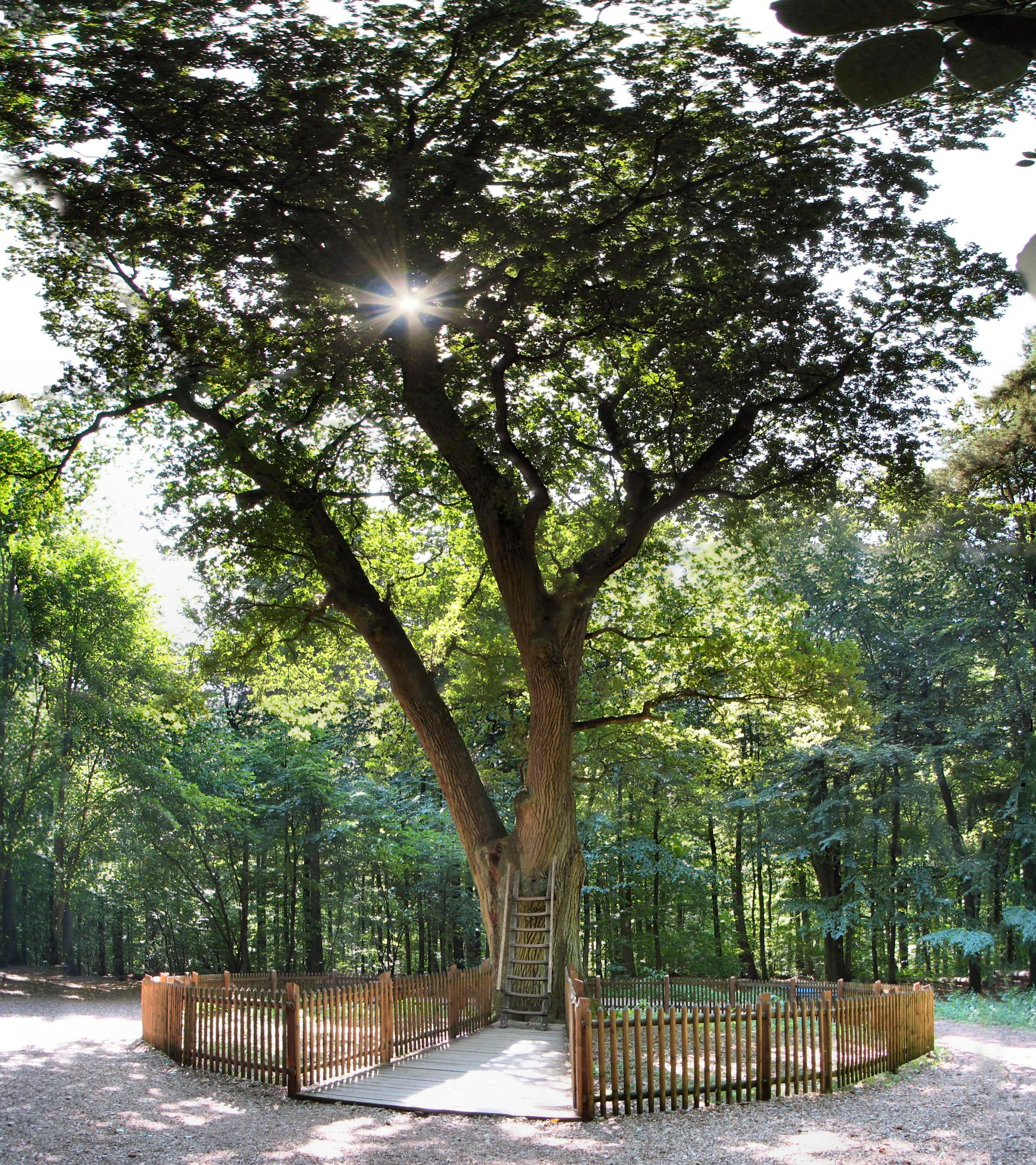
- Bridegroom's Oak, photographed in 2006

- Location within Germany
- Species: English oak (Quercus robur)
- Location: Eutin, Schleswig-Holstein, Germany.
- Coordinates: 54.1363°N 10.5557°E

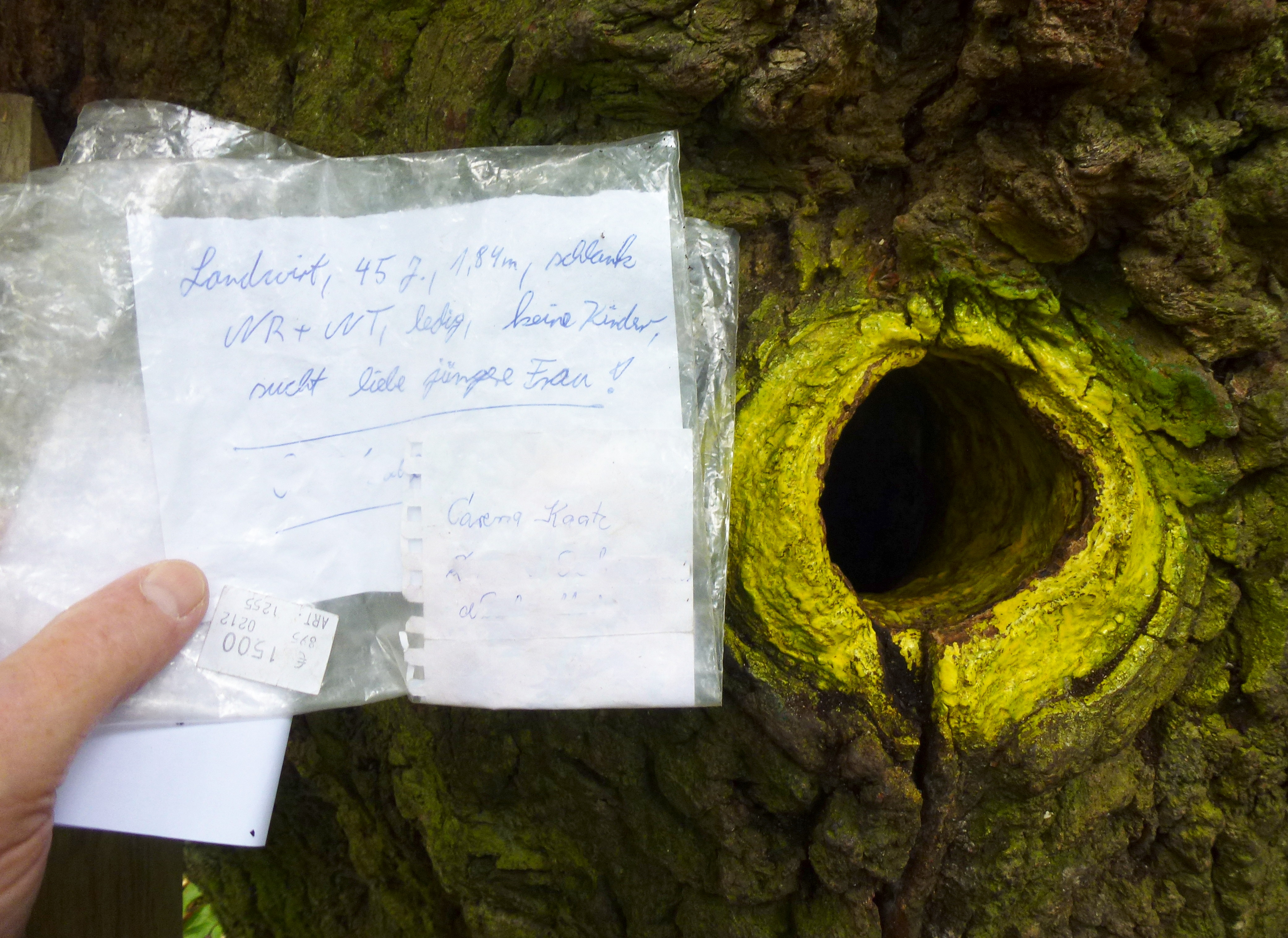
Hole in trunk with a letter seeking a partner

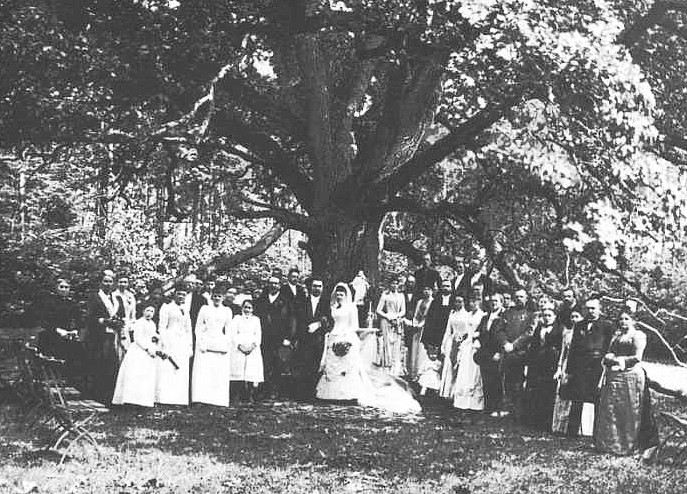
Wedding party under the tree, c. 1900

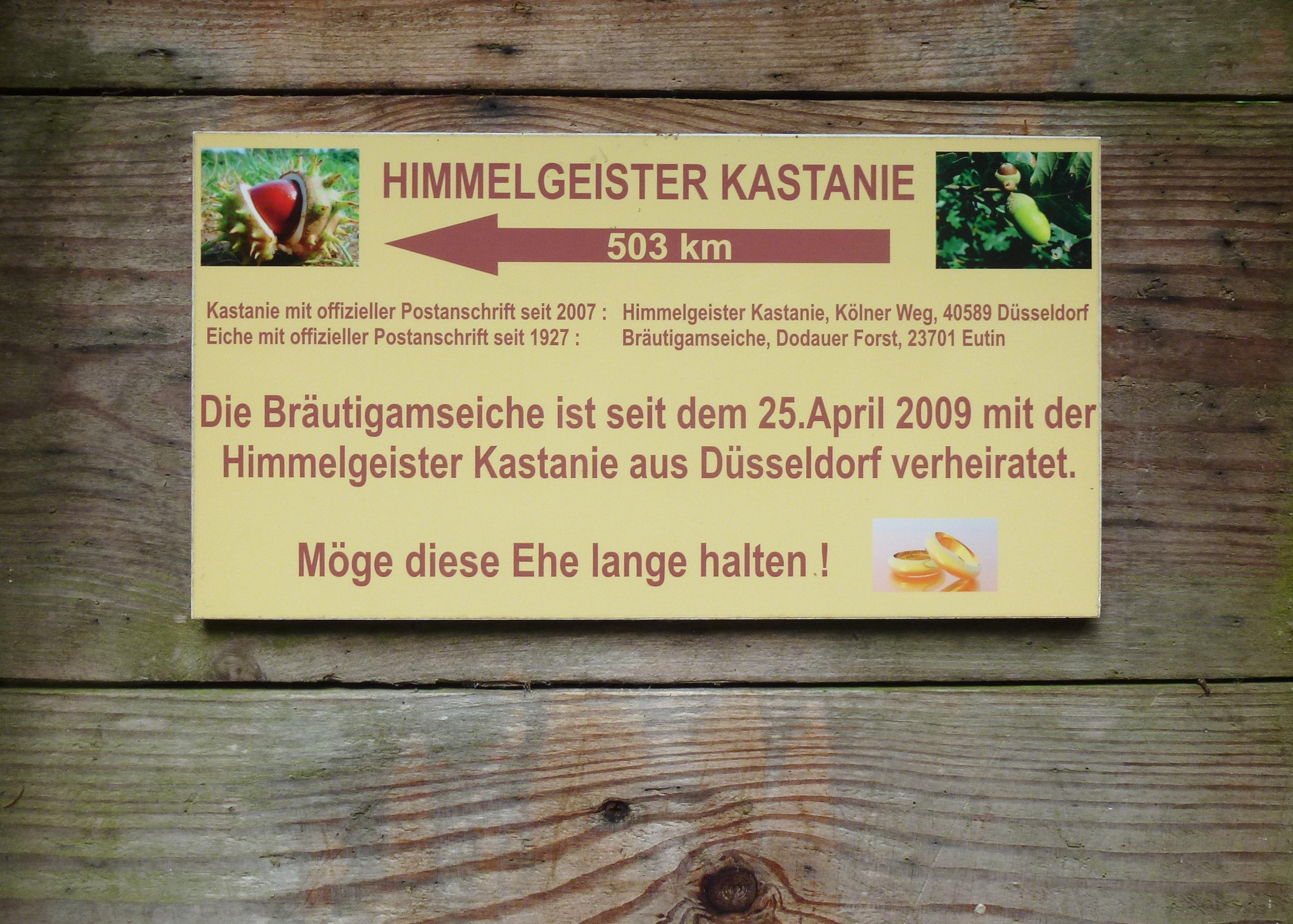
Plaque reporting the marriage of the Bridegroom's Oak

The Bridegroom's Oak (German: Bräutigamseiche) is an oak tree in the Dodauer Forst, a forest near Eutin in Schleswig-Holstein, Germany. It is a registered natural monument, and a hole high in the trunk, reached by a ladder, functions as a dead drop or public letter box for people seeking love partners, and has a postal address.

== Location and description ==
The tree is near a forest road that branches off Bundesstraße 76 shortly after leaving Eutin in the direction of Plön, which is marked with a sign. The address is: Bräutigamseiche, Dodauer Forst, 23701 Eutin, Germany.

The tree is over 500 years old. Its has a trunk circumference of 5 metres (16 ft), a spread of 30 metres (98 ft), and a height of 25 metres (82 ft). The tree is surrounded by a wooden fence except for a path leading to the ladder which gives access to the hole in the trunk; the hole is approximately 3 metres (9.8 ft) off the ground and 30 cm (1 ft) wide. Since the mid-1990s, the crown has been roped to prevent its collapsing. In 2014 a fungal infection (Laetiporus sulphureus) was detected in the trunk and branches; branches have been shortened to reduce wear and the cabling renewed.

== Legends and traditions ==
There is a legend that the tree was planted as a gesture of thanks by the son of a Celtic chieftain after he had been tied to a tree in the forest and was released by a Christian girl. However, this legend is believed by historians to have been invented by Christian missionaries to reinterpret pagan worship of oak trees. A service is still held at the tree on Whit Monday.

Another custom is for a girl to walk around the tree three times under a full moon, thinking of her beloved and without speaking or laughing; she will be married within the year.

== Name and use as a letter drop ==
The name of the tree derives from an incident in the late 19th century. The daughter of the head forester, Ohrt, and the son of a Leipzig chocolate maker, Schütte-Felsche, were in love but her father disapproved of the relationship, so they secretly exchanged letters by leaving them in the hole in the tree's trunk. When Herr Ohrt gave in and granted his permission, they were married under the tree on 2 June 1891.

The history of the oak and word of mouth led to people writing to the tree in the hope of finding a love partner. In 1927 a ladder was set up and later the postal service began to deliver letters to the tree. Letters are deposited six days a week, in the middle of the day. They are from both men and women; a retired postman said in 2006 that he used to deliver four or five a day, from all over the world. It is a public letter box; anyone can open, read, take or answer the letters.

At least five and reportedly more than a hundred marriages have been brought about by the Bridegroom's Oak. One man from North Rhine-Westphalia on a spa holiday in Schleswig-Holstein found a letter from a woman who lived 20 kilometres (12 mi) from him and wound up marrying her. The retired postman knew of two 25-year marriages brought about by the tree, and himself met his wife in the 1990s when she wrote directly to him at the tree after seeing him on a television programme about the oak.

== Marriage ==
On 25 April 2009 the oak itself was symbolically married to the Himmelgeist Chestnut, a horse-chestnut in Düsseldorf, the second tree in Germany to have a postal address. The "marriage" lasted for six years until the chestnut died in 2015 and was reduced to a trunk that was made into a sculpture.

== Media reports ==
The Bridegroom's Oak has been featured on Mongolian radio and on Italian and Japanese television. It is in a German language textbook published by the Goethe Institute. was the focus of a 2018 BBC online article for Valentine's Day, titled "In Germany, the world's most romantic postbox".

On June 19, 2019, the Atlantic published a story entitled The Matchmaking Tree and the Lonely Postman by reporter Jeff Maysh. Maysh chronicled the story of both the tree itself and Karl-Heinz Martens, the tree's postman.

== See also ==
- List of individual trees
