= Pheasant Island (Eutin) =

Island in Germany

Pheasant Island (Fasaneninsel)
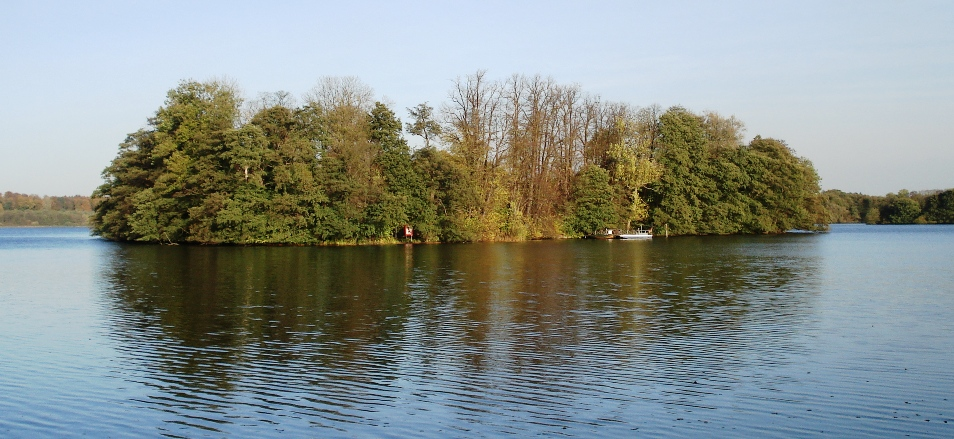
- Pheasant Island in the Großer Eutiner See
- Interactive map of Pheasant Island (Fasaneninsel)

Geography
- Location: Großer Eutiner See
- Coordinates: 54°08′20″N 10°37′34″E
- Length: 0.200 km (0.1243 mi)
- Width: 0.150 km (0.0932 mi)

Administration
- Germany

Pheasant Island (German: Fasaneninsel) is one of the two islands in the south of the lake of Großer Eutiner See, which itself lies in the borough of Eutin in the district of Ostholstein in the German state of Schleswig-Holstein. The island is about 150 m × 200 m (490 ft × 660 ft) across.

From the 9th century, Pheasant Island was the site of a Wendish castle which was given the name Utin and was the centre of the eponymous Gau. The castle was linked to the shore over a bridge.

The castle was destroyed in 1138/39 by the Holsteiners during the conquest of Wagria. The subsequent settlement was built on the shore and developed into the present-day town of Eutin.

Pheasant Island is one of the landmarks of the visual axes of the former Baroque garden of Eutin Castle.

The name "Pheasant Island" is derived from the old pheasantry that used to exist on the island.

Today, the island is privately owned and inhabited.
