= Großer Eutiner See =

Lake in Schleswig-Holstein, Germany

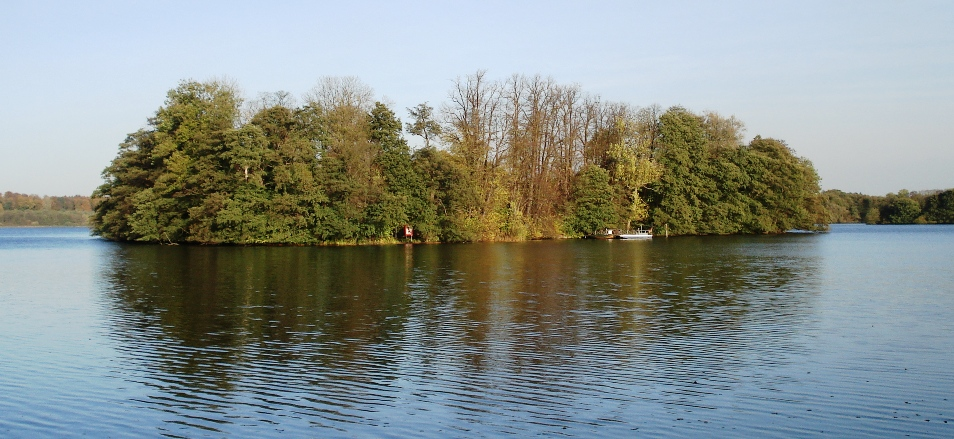
- The Große Eutiner See - Pheasant Island

- Location within Schleswig-Holstein
- Location: Holstein Switzerland
- Coordinates: 54°08′36″N 10°38′14″E
- Primary inflows: Schwentine
- Primary outflows: Schwentine
- Surface area: 2.3 km^{2} (0.89 sq mi)
- Max. depth: 17 m (56 ft)
- Surface elevation: 26.7 m (88 ft)
- Settlements: Eutin

The Großer Eutiner See is a lake in Holstein Switzerland, Schleswig-Holstein, Germany. It lies northeast of the town of Eutin.

It has an area of 230 hectares (570 acres), is up to 17 metres deep and lies at a height of about 26.7 m above sea level (NN). It northern side borders directly on the woods of the Seeschaarwald. In the western part of the lake, separated by the Bebensund Bridge, the Fissauer Bucht, its main inflow, the River Schwentine enters, and then leaves again a little further west. For boating enthusiasts the Schwentine is only navigable upstream as far as the Großer Eutiner See.

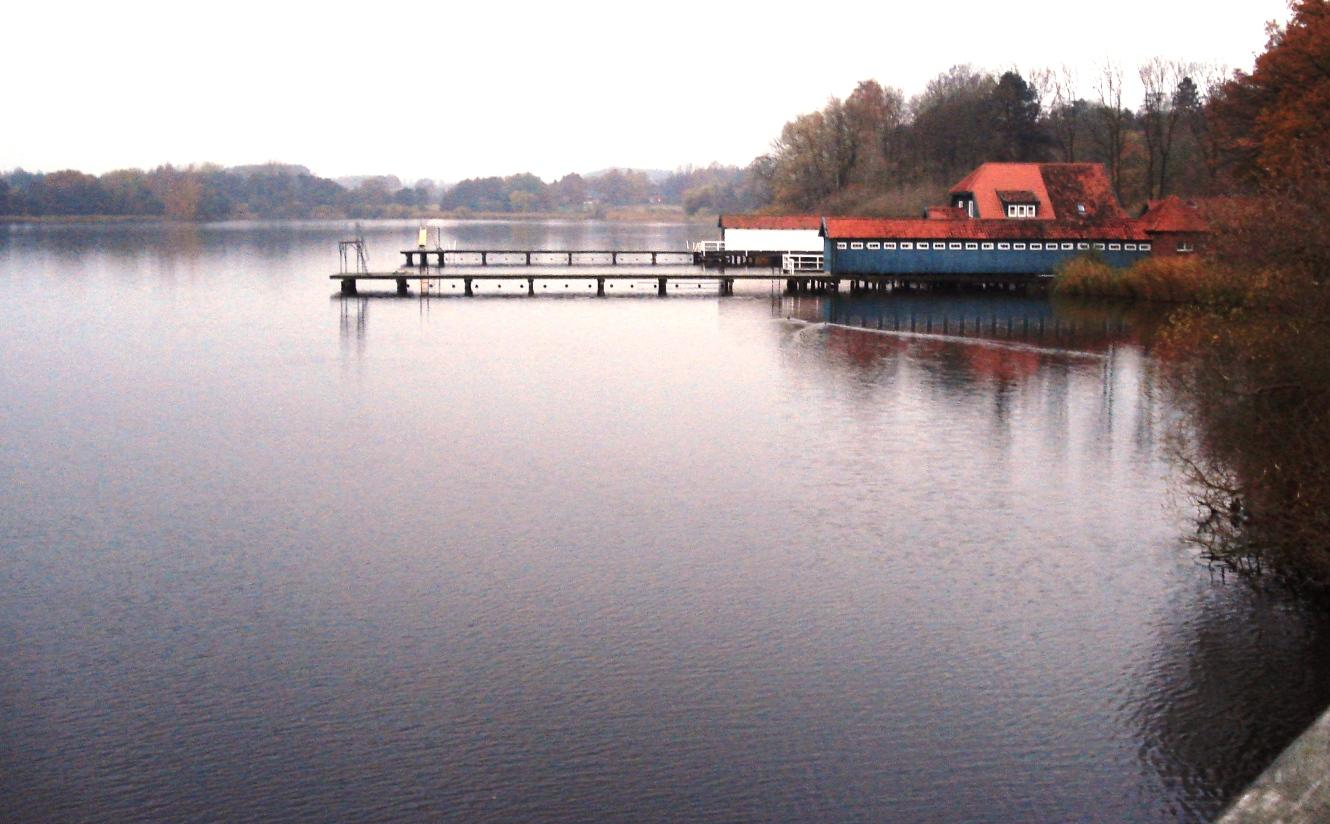
View from the Bebensund Bridge of the eastern part of the Fissauer Bucht with its bathing facilities

There are two islands in the Großer Eutiner See: Pheasant Island (Fasaneninsel) on which the origins of the settlement in that area are located, and which used to be a visual axis point for the former Baroque garden at Eutin Castle and which has been re-occupied today and is in private hands, and the so-called Liebesinsel ("Love Island").

Musicals take place during the summer in the castle garden on the shore of the Großer Eutiner See.

== See also ==
- List of lakes in Schleswig-Holstein
