= Utina =

Utina may refer to:

- Another name for Udine in north Italy
- A Timucua chiefdom in northern Florida during the 16th century, see Agua Dulce people
- Northern Utina, another Timucua tribe, also referred to as the Utina
- USS Utina (ATF-163), a U.S. Navy ship
- Firman Utina (born 1981), Indonesian football player

== See also ==
- Utin (disambiguation)
