= Eutin Castle =

Castle in northern Germany

Coordinates: 54°8′14″N 10°37′13″E

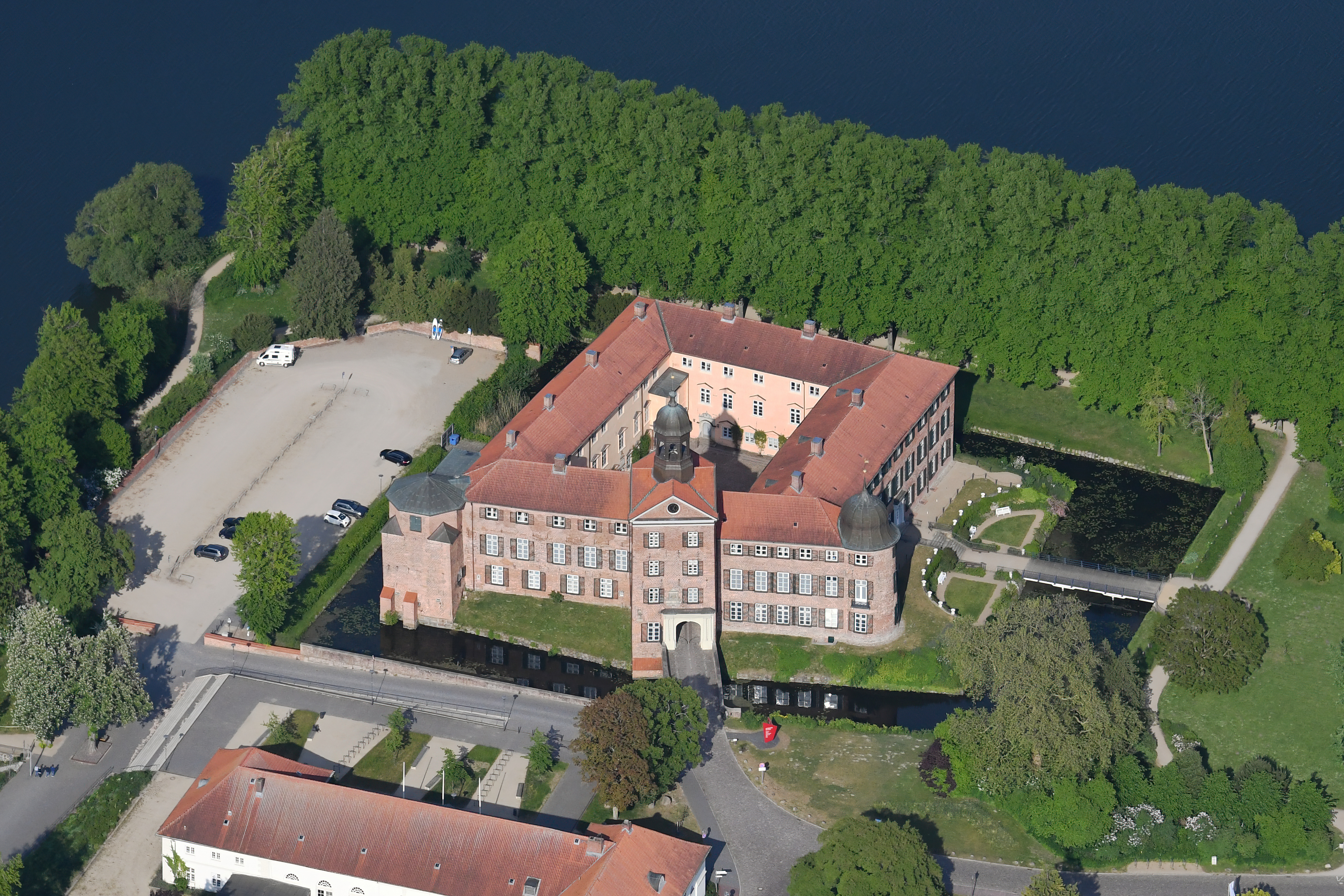
Aerial view of the Eutin Castle

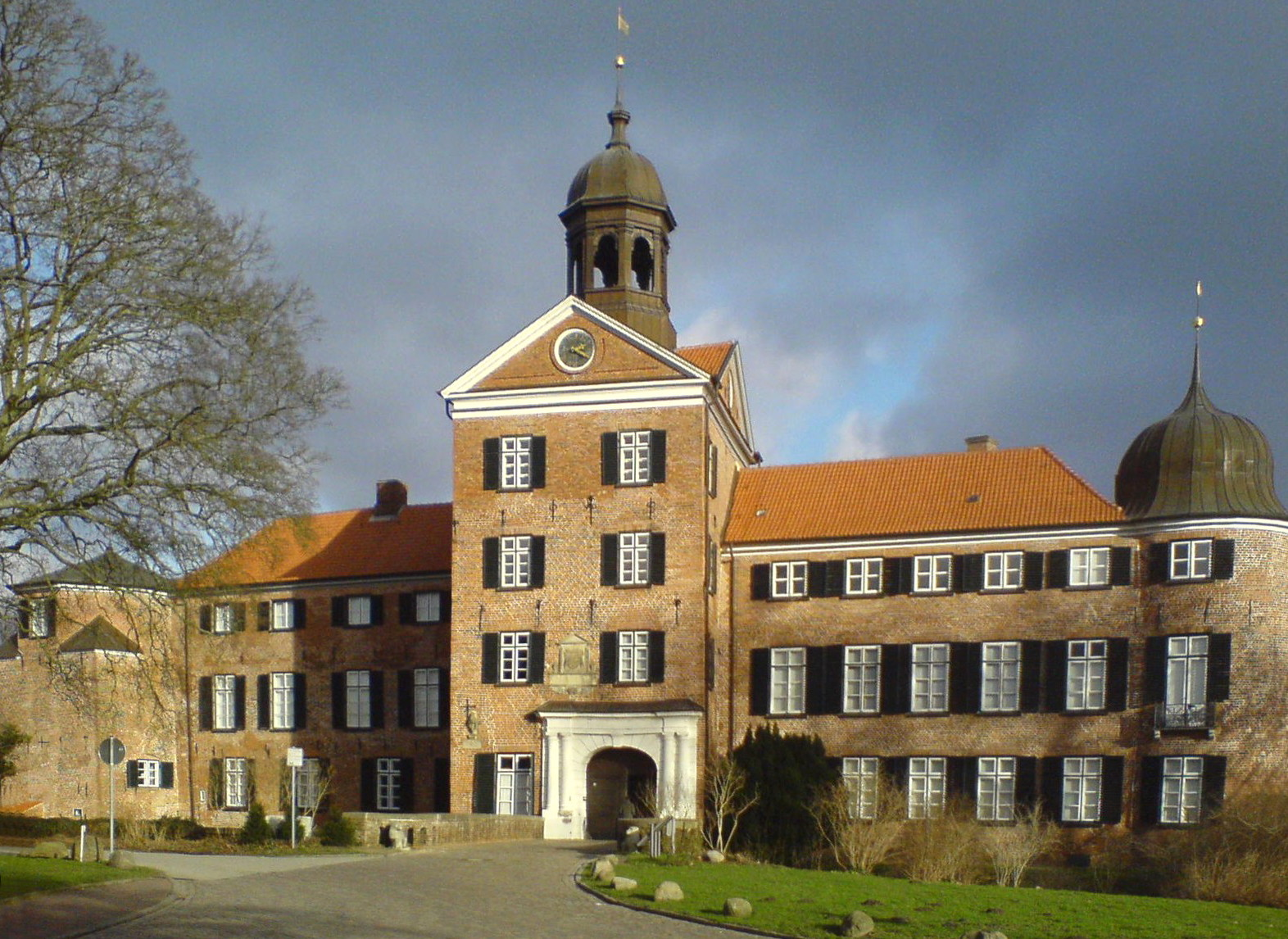
View from the castle square to the main facade with its gate tower

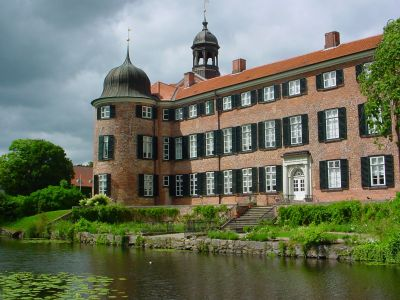
The garden facade of the south wing

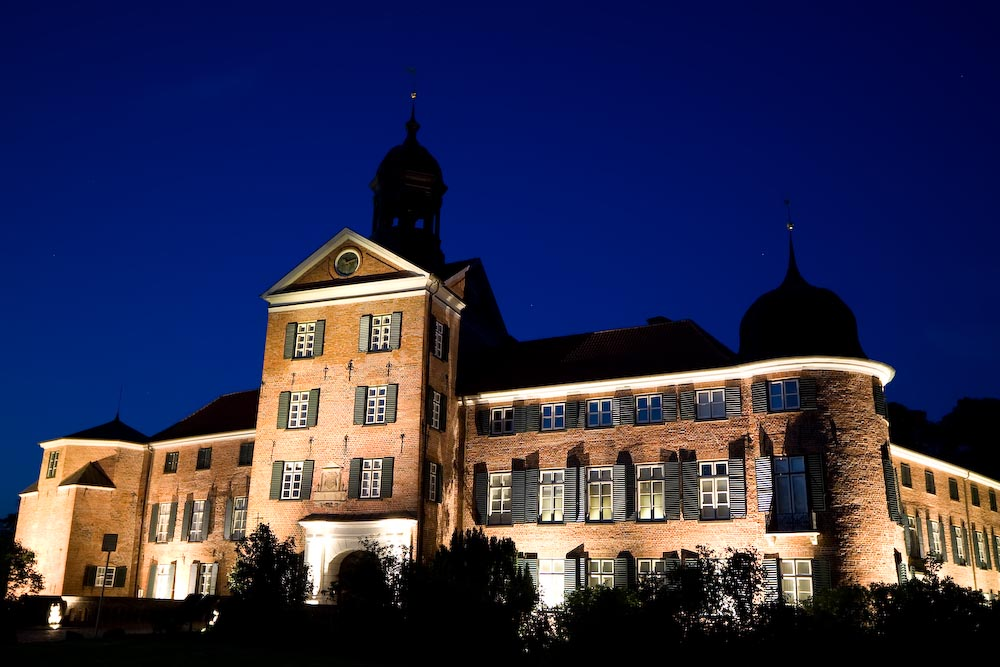
Eutin Castle lit up

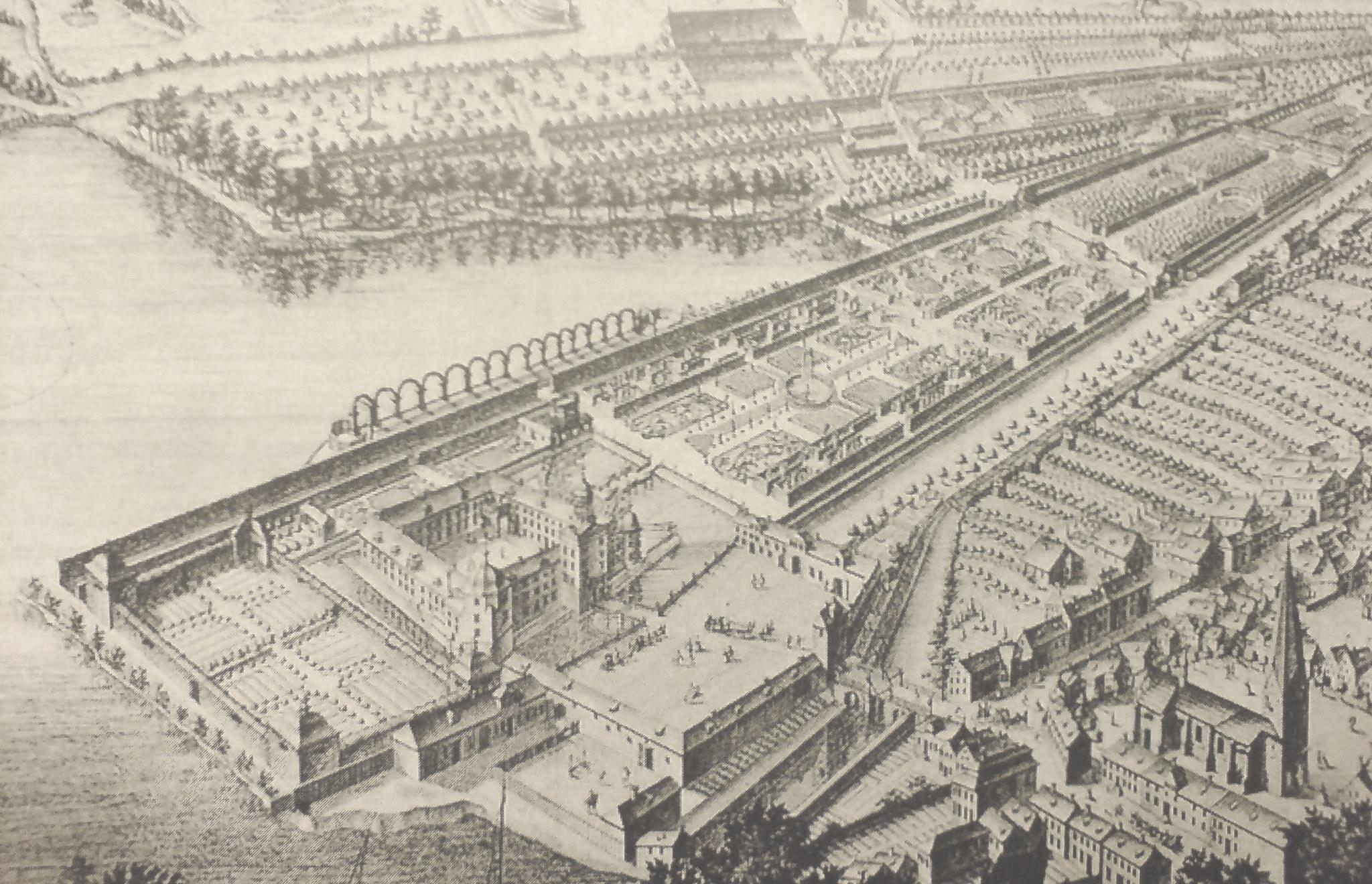
castle complex in the mid of the 18. century, etching after Lewon

Eutin Castle (German: Eutiner Schloss) in Eutin in the north German district of Ostholstein is the cultural centre and nucleus of the town. Taken together, this castle, Gottorf Castle and Glücksburg Castle, form the most important group of courtly secular buildings in the state of Schleswig-Holstein.

== History ==
The four-winged palace originated from a medieval castle and was expanded over several centuries into a Residenz. The castle originally belonged to the Lübeck prince-bishops; later it became the summer residence of the Dukes of Oldenburg. The castle was regularly occupied until the 20th century, and most of the interior has survived to the present day. Today the castle houses a museum and is open to the public in summer. It is now owned by a family foundation of the House of Oldenburg set up by Anton-Günther, Duke of Oldenburg. The former Baroque garden was converted during the 18th and 19th century to a landscaped park: this is the venue for the Eutin festivals.

== Hunting lodge ==
A small, late Baroque hunting lodge on the Ukleisee belongs to Eutin Castle. The lodge was built in 1776 at some distance from the main castle at the behest of Frederick Augustus I of Saxony in order to provide a single-storey pavilion for hunting parties and guests attending special occasions.

== See also ==
- Pheasant Island (Eutin) - a landmark for one of the visual axes of the castle's baroque garden
- Utin Castle

== Literature ==
- Heiko Schulze: Schloss Eutin. Verlag Struve, 1991, ISBN 3-923457-15-4
- I. Bubert: Gutshöfe, Herrenhäuser und Schlösser im östlichen Holstein. Sventana-Verlag, 1995, ISBN 3-927653-06-3
- Hans und Doris Maresch: Schleswig-Holsteins Schlösser, Herrenhäuser und Palais. Husum Verlag, Husum 2006, ISBN 3-89876-278-5
- Dehio: Handbuch der Deutschen Kunstdenkmäler Hamburg, Schleswig-Holstein. Deutscher Kunstverlag, München 1994, ISBN 3-422-03033-6
