= Jonathan Stock =

German journalist and staff writer

Jonathan Stock (born 2 January 1983) is a German journalist and staff writer for Der Spiegel magazine. Stock studied European history at University College London. After graduating, he attended the Henri Nannen School of Journalism. Before joining Der Spiegel in 2012, he contributed as a freelancer for the German television broadcaster ZDF and the weekly newspaper Die Zeit. He covered the Libyan crisis and civil war, the Syrian civil war and the war in Afghanistan. Stock's work has been awarded with several major German prizes in journalism.
