= Pammenes of Marathon =

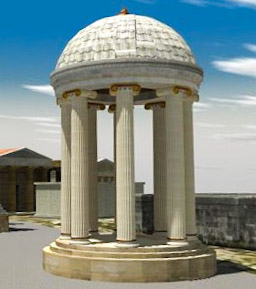
Reconstruction of the Temple of Roma and Augustus on the Acropolis.

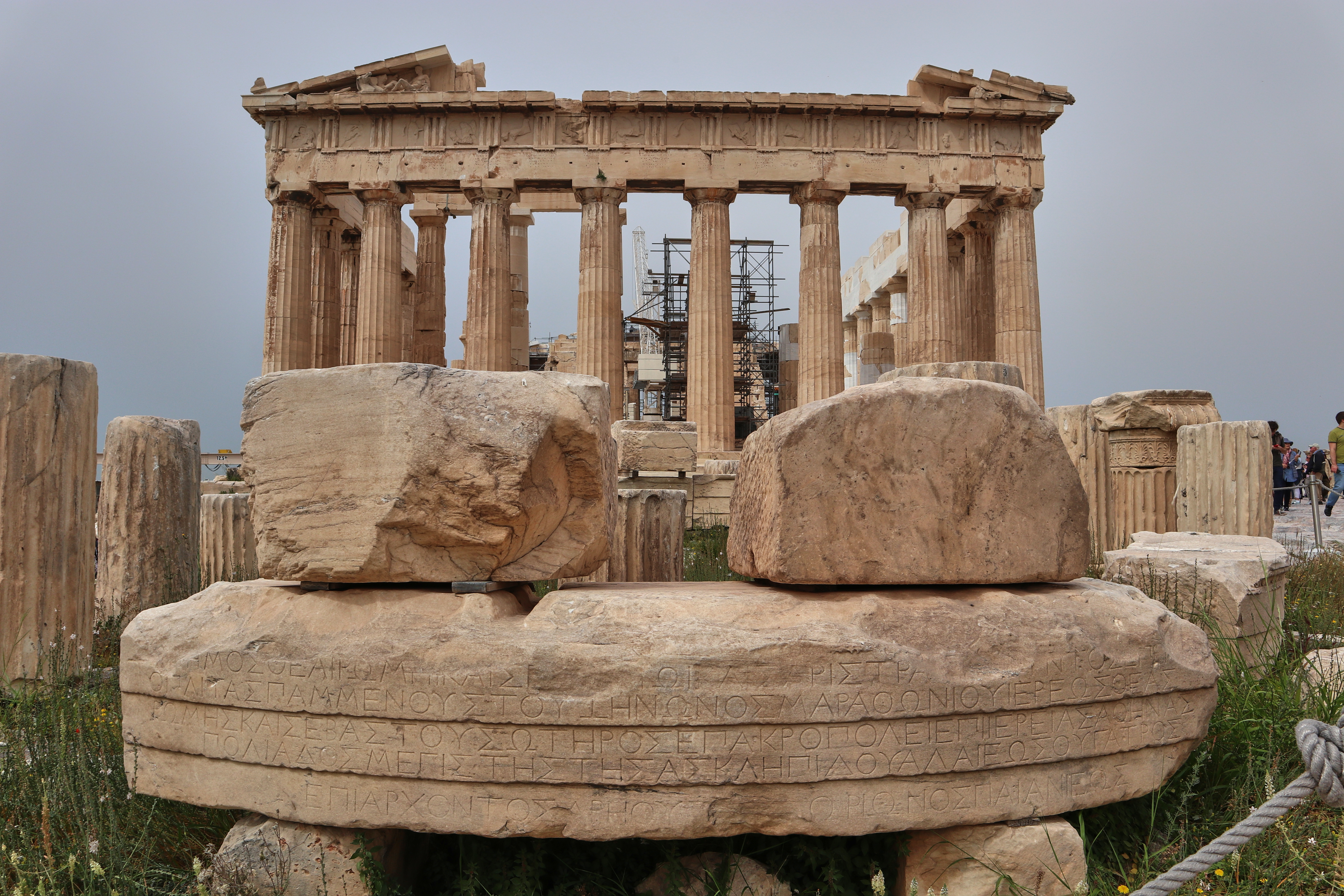
Inscribed remains of the Temple of Roma and Augustus, naming Pammenes as Hoplite General and Priest of Roma and Augustus.

Pammenes of Marathon (Ancient Greek: Παμμένης Ζήνωνος Μαραθώνιος, romanized: Pammenēs Zēnōnos Marathōnios) was a leading Athenian statesman early in the reign of Augustus. He was a key figure in the introduction of the imperial cult at Athens, overseeing the construction of the Temple of Roman and Augustus on the Acropolis and serving as Athens' first priest of Roma and Augustus. He was one of the three leading figures in Athens in the Augustan period, alongside Antipater of Phlya and Eucles of Marathon.

== Life ==
Pammenes belonged to a family that had become prominent on Athenian-controlled Delos in the second century BC and he belonged to two priestly clans, the Gephyraei and the Erysichthonidae. They were "deeply implicated in the restoration of Athenian religion in the late first century BC." His grandfather, also called Pammenes, was archon of Athens in 83/2 BC and his father, Zenon, was epimeletes (essentially governor) of Delos and archon in 54/3 BC. Zenon seems to have been a supporter of Mark Antony in the years leading up to the Battle of Actium. Pammenes' brother, Zenon, was archon in 13/12 BC. In their old age, the city of Athens honoured the two brothers together with a statue group.

In the 30s BC, Pammenes led an embassy from the Gephyraei to Delphi to get sanction for reforms. Shortly after this, he served as agoranomos (market manager) and he was honoured by the merchants with a statue, for his "excellence and justice" in this role (IG II^{2} 3493). He was archon some time between 25/4 BC and 22/1 BC.

He was involved in the establishment of the Imperial cult of Augustus at Athens. At some time between 27 BC and 18/7 BC, while serving as Hoplite General (the chief magistrate of Athens), Pammenes oversaw the construction of the Temple of Goddess Roman and Augustus, directly in front of the Parthenon, on the Acropolis. Its dedicatory inscription (IG II^{3} 4 10) reports that he also became Priest of the Goddess Roma and of Augustus the Saviour on the Acropolis.

Pammenes continued his family's traditional links with Delos, where he served as Priest of Delian Apollo from around 15 BC until at least AD 6. He was also gymnasiarch on the island.

== Descendants ==
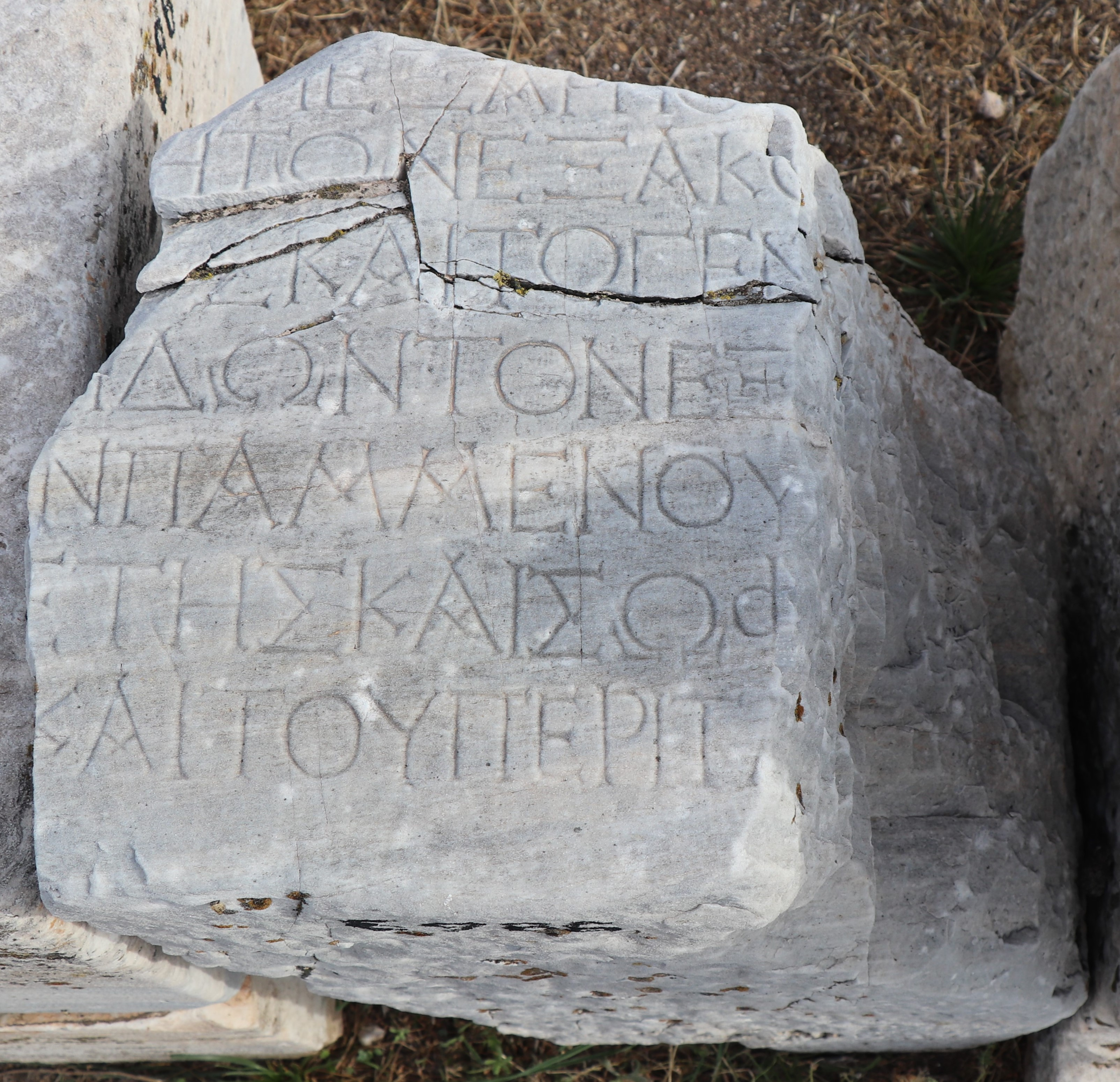
Fragmentary statue base honouring Pammenes' younger son Pammenes, exegetes of the Eleusinian Mysteries.

Pammenes married Phila, daughter of Menneas of Phlya (archon of ca. 30 BC), and they had two sons: Zenon, who was priest of Delian Apollo in the reign of Tiberius, and Pammenes, who became one of the exegetes of the Eleusinian cult and was honoured with a number of statues at Eleusis. They are the last members of the family known to have enjoyed a prominent position in the Athenian polity, although a lead token of the Council from the 150s AD was issued by a descendant.

== Bibliography ==
- Bowersock, Glen W. (2002). "The New Hellenism of Augustan Athens". Annali della Scuola Normale Superiore di Pisa. Classe di Lettere e Filosofia. 7 (1): 1–16. ISSN 0392-095X. JSTOR 24308475.
- Byrne, Sean G. (2003). Roman citizens of Athens. Leuven: Peeters. ISBN 9042913487.
- Follet, Simone (2000). "Les deux archontes Pamménès du Ier siècle a.C. à Athènes". Revue des Études Grecques. 113 (1): 188–192. doi:10.3406/reg.2000.4402.
- Geagan, Daniel J. (1992). "A Family of Marathon and Social Mobility in Athens of the First Century B.C.". Phoenix. 46: 29–44. doi:10.2307/1088772. JSTOR 1088772.
- Geagan, Daniel J. (1997). Hoff, Michael C.; Rotroff, Susan I. (eds.). The Romanization of Athens : proceedings of an international conference held at Lincoln, Nebraska (April 1996). Oxford, England: Oxbow Books. pp. 19–32. ISBN 978-1-900188-51-7.
- Kroll, John H.; Walker, Alan S. (1993). The Athenian Agora XXVI - Greek Coins. American School of Classical Studies at Athens. ISBN 978-0876612262.
- Schmalz, Geoffrey C. R. (2009). Augustan and Julio-Claudian Athens : a new epigraphy and prosopography. Leiden: Brill. ISBN 978-90-04-17009-4.
- Spawforth, Antony (2012). Greece and the Augustan cultural revolution. Cambridge: Cambridge University Press. ISBN 9780511997853.
