= Utin (castle) =

9th century castle in Schleswig-Holstein, Germany

Coordinates: 54°08′20″N 10°37′34″E

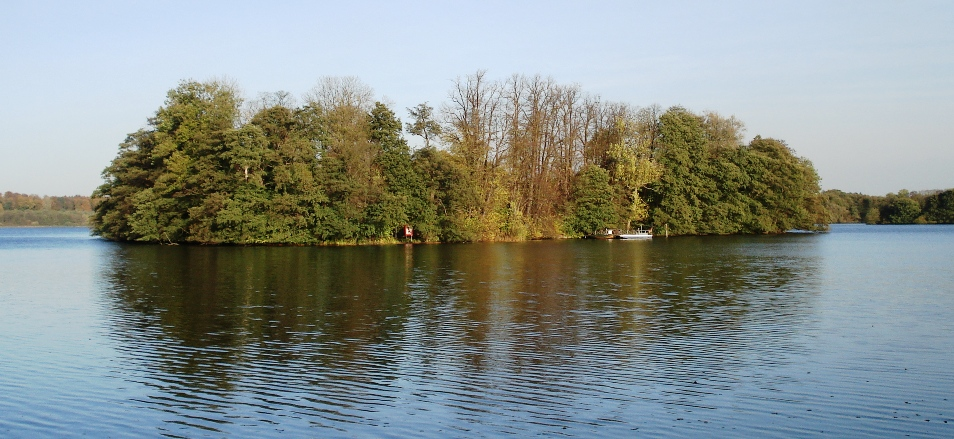
Pheasant Island in the Großer Eutiner See - site of the castle of Utin

Utin (in Latin letters VTIN - also "Uthine") was the name of a Wendish castle that was built in the 9th century on Pheasant Island in the lake known as the Großer Eutiner See in what is now the German state of Schleswig-Holstein. It was the centre of the eponymous Wendish Gau. The castle was linked to the shore via a bridge next to which a settlement, also called Utin, grew up.

The castle was destroyed by the Holcetae tribe when they conquered Wagria in 1138/39.

The site of the settlement - which was the origin of the present-day town of Eutin - on the shore of the Großer Eutiner See, survived and retained the name "Utin" (also e.g. "Uthine") which over the course of time became "Eutin".

The four letters "VTIN" became part of the coat of arms of the town of Eutin.

Coat of arms of Eutin with the letters "VTIN"

== Origin of the name ==
The place name "Utin" is derived from the personal name Uta (or Uto) - embellished by the suffix -in - and means "Uta's settlement".

== Sources ==
- History of Utin Castle
- Utin Castle
- The bridge at Utin Castle
- The bridge at Utin Castle
- The evolution of "Uta" → "Utin"
- Eutin Castle
- Otto Rönnpag. "Die Fasaneninsel, der Ursprung Eutins". Jahrbuch für Heimatkunde, Eutin, 1987 (pages 99-102)
