= Eutin–Neustadt railway =

Former railway line in Germany

Eutin–Neustadt (Holst) railway

Overview
- Line number: 1023
- Locale: Schleswig-Holstein, Germany

Service
- Route number: 146 (1982)

Technical
- Line length: 15.6 km (9.7 mi)

The Eutin–Neustadt railway was a 16-kilometer-long, non-electrified branch line, running from Eutin to Neustadt in Holstein in the German state of Schleswig-Holstein.

== Geography ==
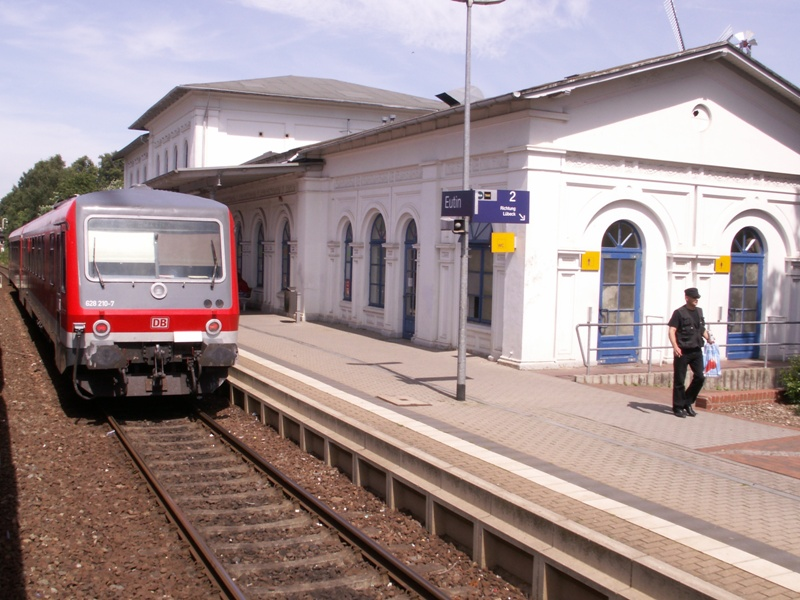
Eutin station

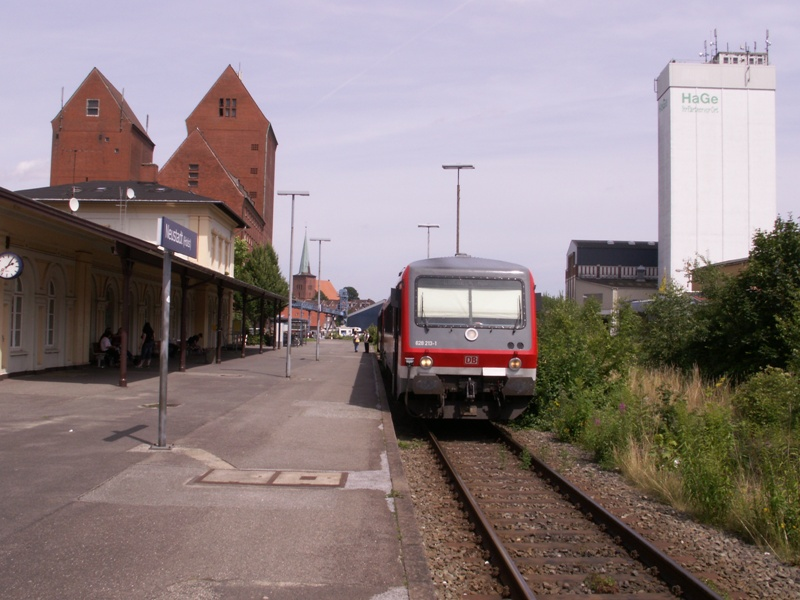
Neustadt in Holstein station

The line ran through the terminal moraine of Ostholstein. It joined the county town of Eutin with the Baltic port of Neustadt.

These were three stations on the line: Röbel, Bujendorf and Oevelgönne. Of these, only Bujendorf had a substantial station building. All three stations were quite far from population centres.

The line was part of an east-west axis, connecting Neustadt, Neumünster and Büsum.

== History ==
The Neumünster–Ascheberg–Eutin–Neustadt line was opened on 31 May 1866. The line was operated by the Altona-Kiel Railway Company (German: Altona-Kieler Eisenbahn-Gesellschaft, AKE), which was nationalised in 1884. In railway timetables, the line was soon shown in three sections. From Eutin to Ascheberg it was considered part of the Kiel–Lübeck railway. The westernmost section from Ascheberg to Neumünster was now managed as a separate line (the Neumünster–Ascheberg railway).

In the 1970s, a single daily pair of services ran between Heide and Neustadt and six pairs of stopping services operated. The express train stopped between Eutin and Neustadt only in Bujendorf. Its travel time was 19 minutes, while the stopping trains took about 22 minutes. Services were operated mainly by class 515 accumulator railcars and class 798 Uerdingen railbuses, but there were also locomotive-hauled trains. Around 1976 there was a pair of express trains on the Kiel–Puttgarden route, which operated in summer. In 1980. “Trans-Europ-Express-Marchandises” international freight trains operated of the Hamburg-Eidelstedt–Neumünster–Eutin–Neustadt–Puttgarden route. Finally in October 1981, long-distance trains on the Lübeck–Puttgarden railway were diverted via the line. On 22 May 1982, passenger services were closed on the line. Freight traffic was closed on 31 December 1982 (according to other sources on 30 December 1983 or 3 June 1984). The tracks were removed in 1984/85. In the town of Eutin there are still tracks to a tank loading facility at the local army barracks, but they have not been used for years.
