= List of gauge conversions =

on

This is a list of notable railway track gauge conversions, railway lines where the distance between the rails is broadened or narrowed. Conversions to broader gauge are generally to accommodate heavier loads or for wider cars, while conversions to narrower gauge tend to be for compatibility with other lines on a rail network. This list also contains instances of lines already prepared for conversion and those which are planned to be converted.

New gauge (mm)	Original (mm)	Date	Flag & Location	Description
1,067 mm (3 ft 6 in)	1,000 mm (3 ft 3 3/8 in)		Angola	Luanda Railway
1,067 mm (3 ft 6 in)	600 mm (1 ft 11 5/8 in)	1950s	Angola	Moçâmedes Railway
1,067 mm (3 ft 6 in)	1,600 mm (5 ft 3 in)	1885	Australia; Tasmania	Rail transport in Tasmania Partially converted to dual gauge as intermediate stage.
1,435 mm (4 ft 8 1/2 in)	1,067 mm (3 ft 6 in)	1970	Australia; South Australia	Transcontinental line: Broken Hill to Port Augusta and Kalgoorlie to Perth as part of the Sydney–Perth rail corridor.
1,435 mm (4 ft 8 1/2 in)	1,067 mm (3 ft 6 in)	1980	Australia; South Australia	Completion of the penultimate link in the Adelaide–Darwin rail corridor, from Tarcoola to Alice Springs. The new line replaced the ancient narrow-gauge Central Australia Railway that was on a different, more floodprone alignment.
1,435 mm (4 ft 8 1/2 in)	1,600 mm (5 ft 3 in)	1990-1995	Australia; South Australia; Victoria	Melbourne–Adelaide rail corridor – 600 km (370 mi) of convertible sleepers installed in 1990 to facilitate quick conversion in 1995.
1,435 mm (4 ft 8 1/2 in)	1,067 mm (3 ft 6 in)	2004	Australia; Northern Territory	Completion of the final link in the Adelaide–Darwin rail corridor, from Alice Springs to Darwin. For about half the distance, the new line replaced the ancient narrow-gauge North Australia Railway that was closed in 1976.
1,435 mm (4 ft 8 1/2 in)	1,600 mm (5 ft 3 in)	ongoing	Australia; Victoria	North East railway line in Victoria. A 200 km (120 mi) section between Seymour and Albury was converted, changing two parallel tracks of different gauges to double track. The Oaklands line that would otherwise have been left as an orphan was converted in 2009. The cost of converting this 126 km (78 mi) line has been estimated as just over A$13,000,000.
1,435 mm (4 ft 8 1/2 in)	1,600 mm (5 ft 3 in)	ongoing	Australia; South Australia	South Australia planned to convert its suburban (broad gauge) network to standard gauge in 2012, in conjunction with proposed electrification works. The Outer Harbor and Belair lines were rebuilt with gauge convertible sleepers and re-sleepering of the Gawler line commenced in 2010. The Seaford line was to commence once the Gawler line was completed. However, both gauge conversion and electrification works were suspended due to funding constraints, with work unlikely to proceed for the foreseeable future.
1,600 mm (5 ft 3 in) (temporary)	1,067 mm (3 ft 6 in)	1950s	Australia; South Australia	The Mount Gambier line in South Australia was fitted with some 3-gauge steel sleepers when it was "temporarily" converted, pending later proposed conversion to 1,435 mm (4 ft 8 1/2 in) (which did not occur, the line being abandoned instead).
1,600 mm (5 ft 3 in)	1,067 mm (3 ft 6 in)	1927	Australia; South Australia	The break of gauge between the broad and narrow gauge lines moved to Hamley Bridge "only" 78 km short of Adelaide and Port Adelaide. The narrow gauge train could reach this break of gauge after travelling 1260 km from Alice Springs.
1,435 mm (4 ft 8 1/2 in)	1,067 mm (3 ft 6 in)	Proposed	Australia; Western Australia	In Western Australia, the narrow-gauge iron ore railways serving Geraldton port and the new port at Oakajee will be designed for ease of conversion to standard gauge.
1,435 mm (4 ft 8 1/2 in)	1,600 mm (5 ft 3 in)	ongoing	Australia; Victoria	In Victoria, several wheat lines amounting to about 1,100 km (680 mi) of track, were (or are to be) converted to standard gauge, including: Maryborough to Mildura, Yelta and Murrayville; Sea Lake and Manangatang. Lines will be converted to dual gauge between Gheringhap to Maryborough. This is part of the Murray Basin Rail Project.
1,435 mm (4 ft 8 1/2 in)	1,067 mm (3 ft 6 in)	ongoing	Australia; Queensland	The Inland Railway line from Melbourne to Brisbane of 1600 km length includes about 300 km of dual gauge that improves the curves and gradients of the original Brisbane to Toowoomba line. This dual gauge replaces the narrow gauge that was chosen to enable cheap 100m radius curves and 2% gradients.
900 mm (2 ft 11 7/16 in)	1,000 mm (3 ft 3 3/8 in)	2008–2009	Austria	Pöstlingbergbahn
1,435 mm (4 ft 8 1/2 in)	760 mm (2 ft 5 15/16 in)	1961	Austria	Tschagguns–Partenen railway
1,435 mm (4 ft 8 1/2 in)	1,600 mm (5 ft 3 in)	1854–1855	Baden	Grand Duchy of Baden State Railway
1,676 mm (5 ft 6 in)	1,000 mm (3 ft 3 3/8 in), 2 ft 6 in (762 mm), 2 ft (610 mm)	ongoing	Bangladesh	Narrow gauge is being converted to broad gauge
762 mm (2 ft 6 in)	1,067 mm (3 ft 6 in)	1898	Barbados	Barbados Railway
1,435 mm (4 ft 8 1/2 in)	1,676 mm (5 ft 6 in)	1880s	Canada	Numerous Provincial Gauge railways in Canada
1,435 mm (4 ft 8 1/2 in)	1,067 mm (3 ft 6 in)	1881	Canada	Toronto, Grey and Bruce Railway
1,435 mm (4 ft 8 1/2 in)	1,067 mm (3 ft 6 in)	1883	Canada	Toronto and Nipissing Railway with third rail stage.
1,435 mm (4 ft 8 1/2 in)	1,524 mm (5 ft)	1938	China	Chinese–Russian-owned line
1,067 mm (3 ft 6 in)	1,524 mm (5 ft)		China	South Manchuria Railway, during the Russo-Japanese War
1,435 mm (4 ft 8 1/2 in)	1,067 mm (3 ft 6 in)		China	South Manchuria Railway, following the Russo-Japanese War
600 mm (1 ft 11 5/8 in)	1,435 mm (4 ft 8 1/2 in)		Czech Republic	Muzeum Průmyslových Železnic
1,067 mm (3 ft 6 in)	1,000 mm (3 ft 3 3/8 in)	1956	Democratic Republic of the Congo	Kindu (Lualaba River port) – Kibombo – Kongolo – Kabalo (Lualaba River port and junction with Katanga line) – Nyunzu – Niemba – Kalemie (the port on Lake Tanganyika): This line was isolated meter gauge until 1955, when the gauge was changed for the connection with the Katanga line in 1956.
1,067 mm (3 ft 6 in)	762 mm (2 ft 6 in)	1932	Democratic Republic of the Congo	Matadi–Kinshasa Railway converted to 1,067 mm (3 ft 6 in) on new alignment.
600 mm (1 ft 11 5/8 in)	610 mm (2 ft)		Democratic Republic of the Congo	Mayumbe line
1,435 mm (4 ft 8 1/2 in)	1,000 mm (3 ft 3 3/8 in)	1924	Denmark	Skagen Line in Denmark
500 mm (19 3/4 in)	600 mm (1 ft 11 5/8 in)		France	Chemin de Fer Touristique du Tarn
1,435 mm (4 ft 8 1/2 in)	1,000 mm (3 ft 3 3/8 in)	ongoing	Greece	Piraeus–Patras railway
1,435 mm (4 ft 8 1/2 in)	1,000 mm (3 ft 3 3/8 in)	2001	Greece	Palaiofarsalos–Kalambaka railway
1,435 mm (4 ft 8 1/2 in)	1,000 mm (3 ft 3 3/8 in)	1960	Greece	Larissa–Volos railway
1,435 mm (4 ft 8 1/2 in)	1,520 mm (4 ft 11 27/32 in)	1941	Nazi Germany	Brest–Minsk
1,435 mm (4 ft 8 1/2 in)	750 mm (2 ft 5 1/2 in)	1964/65	Germany	Zabergäu Railway
600 mm (1 ft 11 5/8 in)	1,435 mm (4 ft 8 1/2 in)	2004	Germany	Malente-Gremsmühlen–Lütjenburg railway
600 mm (1 ft 11 5/8 in)	1,435 mm (4 ft 8 1/2 in)	2006	Germany	Waldheim–Kriebethal railway
1,676 mm (5 ft 6 in)	1,000 mm (3 ft 3 3/8 in),	ongoing	India	Project Unigauge
1,067 mm (3 ft 6 in)	1,435 mm (4 ft 8 1/2 in)	1923	Japan	Iyo Railway
1,435 mm (4 ft 8 1/2 in)	1,372 mm (4 ft 6 in)	1959	Japan	Keisei Electric Railway; converted for through-service into Toei Asakusa Line
1,520 mm (4 ft 11 27/32 in)	750 mm (2 ft 5 1/2 in)	early 1970s	Kazakh Soviet Socialist Republic	Kokchetav network, 305 km (190 mi), operational since 1954, partly regauged to Russian gauge.
1,000 mm (3 ft 3 3/8 in)	600 mm (1 ft 11 5/8 in)		Laos	Don Det–Don Khon narrow-gauge railway
750 mm (2 ft 5 1/2 in)	600 mm (1 ft 11 5/8 in)		Latvia	Liepāja–Rucava line, 52 km military line
750 mm (2 ft 5 1/2 in)	600 mm (1 ft 11 5/8 in)		Lithuania	Further information: Narrow-gauge railways in Lithuania
1,435 mm (4 ft 8 1/2 in)	600 mm (1 ft 11 5/8 in)	1950s	Yugoslavia: North Macedonia	Ohrid line
1,067 mm (3 ft 6 in)	610 mm (2 ft)	1910	Mozambique / Zimbabwe	Beira–Salisbury
1,067 mm (3 ft 6 in)	600 mm (1 ft 11 5/8 in)	1950	Namibia	Moçâmedes Railway
1,067 mm (3 ft 6 in)	600 mm (1 ft 11 5/8 in)	1915–1961	Namibia	Otavi Mining and Railway Company
1,067 mm (3 ft 6 in)	600 mm (1 ft 11 5/8 in)	1910–	Namibia	Swakopmund–Windhoek line
914 mm (3 ft)	610 mm (2 ft)	1920	Nauru	Rail transport in Nauru
1,676 mm (5 ft 6 in)	762 mm (2 ft 6 in)	2018	Nepal	Jaynagar–Janakpur railway was regauged.
1,067 mm (3 ft 6 in)	1,600 mm (5 ft 3 in)		New Zealand	Canterbury Provincial Railways
1,067 mm (3 ft 6 in)	762 mm (2 ft 6 in)	1912–1914	Nigeria	Bauchi Light Railway
			Nigeria	Port Harcourt – Onne, convertible sleepers installed since gauge conversion not imminent.
1,067 mm (3 ft 6 in)	750 mm (2 ft 5 1/2 in)	1915	Norway	Sulitjelma Line converted from 750 mm (2 ft 5 1/2 in) to dual gauge with 1,067 mm (3 ft 6 in) and when later closed was converted to a road.
1,435 mm (4 ft 8 1/2 in)	1,067 mm (3 ft 6 in)	1922	Norway	Skøyen–Filipstad Line
1,435 mm (4 ft 8 1/2 in)	1,067 mm (3 ft 6 in)	1922	Norway	Trondhjem–Støren Line
1,435 mm (4 ft 8 1/2 in)	1,067 mm (3 ft 6 in)	1935	Norway	Arendal Line
1,435 mm (4 ft 8 1/2 in)	1,067 mm (3 ft 6 in)	1944	Norway	Ålgård Line
1,435 mm (4 ft 8 1/2 in)	1,067 mm (3 ft 6 in)	1941	Norway; Nazi Germany	Røros Line in occupied Norway converted by German forces.
1,435 mm (4 ft 8 1/2 in)	1,067 mm (3 ft 6 in)	1949	Norway	Grevskap Line in Norway
1,676 mm (5 ft 6 in)	1,000 mm (3 ft 3 3/8 in), 2 ft 6 in (762 mm), 2 ft (610 mm)	2000	Pakistan	All narrow-gauge tracks in Pakistan were re-gauged or were dismantled.
1,435 mm (4 ft 8 1/2 in)	1,524 mm (5 ft)	2001	Panama	The Panama Canal Railroad, by then in a dilapidated state, was reconstructed and relaid.
1,435 mm (4 ft 8 1/2 in)	914 mm (3 ft)	2009	Peru	Peru from Huancayo to Huancavelica; 147 km (91 mi).
1,435 mm (4 ft 8 1/2 in)	1,067 mm (3 ft 6 in)	2019–ongoing	Philippines	The Philippine National Railways is reconstructing its dilapidated narrow-gauge network to standard gauge.
1,435 mm (4 ft 8 1/2 in)	1,524 mm (5 ft)	after 1918	Poland	In part of Poland under Russian control (Russian Partition), some railways were Russian broad gauge. These were converted to standard gauge after Poland gained independence, to unify the national system.
1,435 mm (4 ft 8 1/2 in)	600 mm (1 ft 11 5/8 in)	1924	Poland	World War I field railway connecting Nasielsk and Sierpc, 88 km long.
750 mm (2 ft 5 1/2 in)	1,000 mm (3 ft 3 3/8 in)	1932	Poland	World War I field railway from Dūkštas to Druya. After the occupation of the Vilnius Region by Poland, the PKP regauged the line. After World War II the majority of the line ended up in Belorussian SSR and closed in the 1970s.
1,668 mm (5 ft 5 21/32 in)	1,664 mm (5 ft 5 1/2 in)	19th century	Portugal	
1,668 mm (5 ft 5 21/32 in)	1,000 mm (3 ft 3 3/8 in)	2004	Portugal	The Guimarães line in Portugal was electrified and converted from metre gauge to Iberian broad gauge in 2004.
1,520 mm (4 ft 11 27/32 in)	1,067 mm (3 ft 6 in)	2003-2019	Russia	The railways of Sakhalin Island were converted in sections, first laying the third (outer) rail, making rail lines usable by both Japanese- and Russian-gauge trains. Once the railways throughout the island have been converted to the Russian gauge (by 2012), the inner rail was removed.
		–1918	Russian Empire; German Empire	World War I as fronts and borders changed
		–1945	Soviet Union; Nazi Germany	World War II as fronts and borders changed
1,524 mm (5 ft)	1,829 mm (6 ft)	1897	Russian Empire	The first railway in Russia connecting Saint Petersburg to Tsarskoye Selo
1,435 mm (4 ft 8 1/2 in)	1,067 mm (3 ft 6 in)	(proposed)	Sierra Leone	Port Pepel iron ore line, derelict
1,067 mm (3 ft 6 in)	610 mm (2 ft)		South Africa	Further information: Two-foot-gauge railways in South Africa
1,668 mm (5 ft 5 21/32 in)	1,672 mm (5 ft 5 13/16 in)	19th century	Spain	
1,000 mm (3 ft 3 3/8 in)	1,067 mm (3 ft 6 in)	1976	Spain	The line from Cartagena to Los Blancos was converted at the same time it was extended to Los Nietos.
1,435 mm (4 ft 8 1/2 in)	1,668 mm (5 ft 5 21/32 in)	2000s	Spain	Spain is building its high-speed lines to standard gauge, even though the existing system is Iberian; new cutoff lines are being built with gauge-convertible sleepers.
1,676 mm (5 ft 6 in)	762 mm (2 ft 6 in)	1996	Sri Lanka	The only narrow-gauge lines in Sri Lanka: Kelani Valley line was regauged while the 762 mm (2 ft 6 in) Uda Pussellawa railway was dismantled.
600 mm (1 ft 11 5/8 in)	1,435 mm (4 ft 8 1/2 in)	1960s	Sweden	The Östra Södermanlands Järnväg railway in Mariefred mostly runs on tracks which were converted from standard gauge when it was remade into a heritage railway in the 1960s.
891 mm (2 ft 11 3/32 in)	1,435 mm (4 ft 8 1/2 in)	1934	Sweden	The short and isolated standard gauge tram line Långängsbanan built in 1911 in the northern Stockholm suburb of Stocksund, was converted to the narrow 891 mm (2 ft 11 3/32 in) Swedish three foot of the adjacent Roslag Railway in 1934. Långängsbanan was closed in 1966.
1,435 mm (4 ft 8 1/2 in)	891 mm (2 ft 11 3/32 in)	1973-1978	Sweden	The railway between Kalmar and Berga was converted during the 1970s.
1,435 mm (4 ft 8 1/2 in)	891 mm (2 ft 11 3/32 in)	1972	Sweden	The railway between Sandbäckshult and Mönsterås was converted between 1970 and 1972. In Sandbäckshult, the line connects to the Kalmar-Berga line. Both were converted to facilitate standard gauge transport to the pulp mill in Mönsterås.
1,435 mm (4 ft 8 1/2 in)	891 mm (2 ft 11 3/32 in)	1953-1962	Sweden	Kinnekulle Line
1,435 mm (4 ft 8 1/2 in)	1,600 mm (5 ft 3 in)	1854	Switzerland	Swiss Northern Railway
1,000 mm (3 ft 3 3/8 in)	750 mm (2 ft 5 1/2 in)	2022	Switzerland	Waldenburg Railway Being converted as part of a modernisation of the line.
1,000 mm (3 ft 3 3/8 in)	1,435 mm (4 ft 8 1/2 in)	2010	Switzerland	Swiss National Railway The former Nationalbahn line from Aarau to Suhr was converted to metre gauge to allow replacement of a street running section on the Menziken–Aarau–Schöftland railway line
1,435 mm (4 ft 8 1/2 in)	1,050 mm (3 ft 5 11/32 in)	(proposed)	Syria	Hejaz Railway
			Tanzania	Tanzania in 2008 is proposed 1,000 mm (3 ft 3 3/8 in)/1,067 mm (3 ft 6 in) steel sleepers and 1,000 mm (3 ft 3 3/8 in)/1,435 mm (4 ft 8 1/2 in) concrete sleepers to suit gauge conversion.
1,000 mm (3 ft 3 3/8 in)	1,435 mm (4 ft 8 1/2 in)	1920 onward	Thailand	From 1920, the standard gauge part of the Siam railway amounting to 1,000 km (620 mi) was converted first to third rail, and then to 1,000 mm (3 ft 3 3/8 in) (metre gauge) making the whole system metre gauge.
1,435 mm (4 ft 8 1/2 in)	1,000 mm (3 ft 3 3/8 in)	(proposed)	Tunisia	Tunis - Sfax Line
1,435 mm (4 ft 8 1/2 in)	1,520 mm (4 ft 11 27/32 in)	1920s	Turkey	Kars–Gyumri–Tbilisi railway
750 mm (2 ft 5 1/2 in)	760 mm (2 ft 5 15/16 in)	1948–1949	Ukrainian Soviet Socialist Republic	Beregovo region network, around 200 km (120 mi); initially built during the Hungarian Empire and regauged when Ukraine became part of the Soviet Union.
750 mm (2 ft 5 1/2 in)	760 mm (2 ft 5 15/16 in)		Ukrainian Soviet Socialist Republic	Uzhhorod region, 35 km (22 mi).
750 mm (2 ft 5 1/2 in)	600 mm (1 ft 11 5/8 in)		Ukrainian Soviet Socialist Republic	Vapniarka railways, 140 km (87 mi).
1,435 mm (4 ft 8 1/2 in)	1,524 mm (5 ft)	1844	United Kingdom: England	The Eastern Counties Railway, constructed in 1839 and the connecting Northern and Eastern Railway, constructed in 1840.
610 mm (2 ft)	1,435 mm (4 ft 8 1/2 in)		United Kingdom: Wales	Eigiau Reservoir Tramway
381 mm (15 in)	610 mm (2 ft)	1916	United Kingdom: Wales	Fairbourne Railway
311 mm (12 1/4 in)	381 mm (15 in)	1986	United Kingdom: Wales	Fairbourne Railway
610 mm (2 ft)	914 mm (3 ft)	1986	United Kingdom: Wales	Gorseddau Junction and Portmadoc Railway
1,435 mm (4 ft 8 1/2 in)	2,140 mm (7 ft 1/4 in)	1892	United Kingdom: England / Wales	Great Western Railway
600 mm (1 ft 11 5/8 in)	597 mm (1 ft 11 1/2 in)		United Kingdom: England	Lynton and Barnstaple Railway
1,067 mm (3 ft 6 in)	597 mm (1 ft 11 1/2 in)	2002	United Kingdom: England	Southport Pier Tramway
597 mm (1 ft 11 1/2 in)	1,067 mm (3 ft 6 in)	1950	United Kingdom: England	Southport Pier Tramway
1,435 mm (4 ft 8 1/2 in)	2,140 mm (7 ft 1/4 in)	1872	United Kingdom: Wales	Teifi Valley Railway
603 mm (1 ft 11 3/4 in)	597 mm (1 ft 11 1/2 in)	1901–1902	United Kingdom: Wales	Vale of Rheidol Railway
825 mm (2 ft 8 1/2 in)	610 mm (2 ft)	1884	United Kingdom: England	Volk's Electric Railway
1,435 mm (4 ft 8 1/2 in)	1,524 mm (5 ft)	1865	United States; California	Sacramento Valley Railroad
1,435 mm (4 ft 8 1/2 in)	1,473 mm (4 ft 10 in)	1866	United States; New Jersey	Morris and Essex converted in 12 days
1,435 mm (4 ft 8 1/2 in) / 4 ft 9 in (1,448 mm)		1870s	United States	17 companies acquired by the Pennsylvania Railroad
1,524 mm (5 ft)	1,067 mm (3 ft 6 in)	1877	United States; California	Sutter Street Railway
1,435 mm (4 ft 8 1/2 in)	914 mm (3 ft)	1879	United States; California	Monterey Branch Line
1,435 mm (4 ft 8 1/2 in)	965 mm (3 ft 2 in)	1879	United States; California	Monterey and Pacific Grove Railway
1,435 mm (4 ft 8 1/2 in)	914 mm (3 ft)	1881	United States; Colorado	Denver to Pueblo on Denver & Rio Grande Railroad. This began a progressive and gradual conversion to standard gauge across Colorado, wherever the traffic justified the conversion
914 mm (3 ft)	1,524 mm (5 ft)	1881–1882	United States; Georgia	Cherokee Railroad
914 mm (3 ft)	1,067 mm (3 ft 6 in)	1883	United States; Arkansas	Arkansas Midland Railroad
1,435 mm (4 ft 8 1/2 in)	1,067 mm (3 ft 6 in)	1884	United States; New Jersey	Philadelphia and Atlantic City Railway
1,435 mm (4 ft 8 1/2 in)	1,524 mm (5 ft)	1886	United States	AN ACT to establish the gauge of the Pacific railroad and its branches. set the standard for the First transcontinental railroad and encouraged previously laid lines to regauge. Southern railroads were not converted until 1886 when they were regauged to 1448 mm (4 ft 9 in). This was functionally compatible with standard gauge, final conversions taking place as track was maintained. Main article: Track gauge in the United States § Towards standardization
1,435 mm (4 ft 8 1/2 in)	914 mm (3 ft)	1887	United States; Arkansas	Arkansas Midland Railroad
1,435 mm (4 ft 8 1/2 in)	914 mm (3 ft)	1890	United States; Alabama	Anniston and Atlantic Railroad
1,435 mm (4 ft 8 1/2 in)	914 mm (3 ft)	c. 1890	United States; Texas	Austin and Northwestern Railroad
1,435 mm (4 ft 8 1/2 in)	914 mm (3 ft)	1897	United States; California	San Joaquin and Sierra Nevada Railroad
1,435 mm (4 ft 8 1/2 in)	1,067 mm (3 ft 6 in)	1898	United States; California	San Diego Electric Railway
4 ft (1,219 mm)	1,435 mm (4 ft 8 1/2 in)	c. 1901	United States; Texas	Streetcars in San Antonio, Texas
1,435 mm (4 ft 8 1/2 in)	914 mm (3 ft)	1902	United States; Iowa	Burlington and Northwestern Railway
1,435 mm (4 ft 8 1/2 in)	914 mm (3 ft)	1905	United States; Nevada	Carson and Colorado Railway between Churchill and Mina
1,435 mm (4 ft 8 1/2 in)	4 ft 10 in (1,473 mm)	1905	United States; Illinois	East St. Louis and Suburban Railway Belleville Line, Edwardsville Line, and the Edgemont and Collinsville Line
1,435 mm (4 ft 8 1/2 in)	1,067 mm (3 ft 6 in)	1906	United States; California	Venice Short Line when sold from the Los Angeles Pacific Railroad to the Pacific Electric
1,435 mm (4 ft 8 1/2 in)	1,524 mm (5 ft)	1906	United States; California	Market Street Railway Polk cable car rebuilt as standard gauge electric trolley following the 1906 San Francisco earthquake
1,435 mm (4 ft 8 1/2 in)	3 ft 8 in (1,118 mm)	1907	United States; California	Oakland, San Leandro and Haywards Electric Railway
1,435 mm (4 ft 8 1/2 in)	1,067 mm (3 ft 6 in)	1908	United States; Oregon	some Portland Railway, Light and Power Company streetcar lines
1,435 mm (4 ft 8 1/2 in)	914 mm (3 ft)	1909	United States; California	South Pacific Coast Railway
1,435 mm (4 ft 8 1/2 in)	1,067 mm (3 ft 6 in)	1909	United States; California	Hollywood Line, with five miles (8.0 km) of streetcar tracks converted in one night on September 15, 1909.
1,435 mm (4 ft 8 1/2 in)	4 ft 9 in (1,448 mm)	c. 1910s	United States; California	Pennsylvania Railroad, though tracks had variously been built to standard gauge for some time prior.
1,435 mm (4 ft 8 1/2 in)	1,676 mm (5 ft 6 in)	1911	United States; Maine	Maine Central Railroad Company
1,435 mm (4 ft 8 1/2 in)	914 mm (3 ft)	1911	United States; Pennsylvania	Altoona and Beech Creek Railroad
1,435 mm (4 ft 8 1/2 in)	914 mm (3 ft)	1928	United States; California	Nevada–California–Oregon Railway north of Wendel by the Southern Pacific Railroad and south of Reno Junction by the Western Pacific Railroad
1,435 mm (4 ft 8 1/2 in)	3 ft 9 1/2 in (1,156 mm)	c. 1940s	United States; California	Arcata and Mad River Railroad
1,588 mm (5 ft 2 1/2 in)	1,435 mm (4 ft 8 1/2 in)	1997	United States; Louisiana	The Riverfront Streetcar Line of the New Orleans streetcar system was converted to conform with the rest of the historic streetcar system.
1,435 mm (4 ft 8 1/2 in)	1,520 mm (4 ft 11 27/32 in)		Central Asia	While China and Europe are connected by rail, and while both are mainly 1,435 mm (4 ft 8 1/2 in), the intervening Central Asia Railways are 1,520 mm (4 ft 11 27/32 in) gauge. There are discussions about facilitating an eventual linkage of the Chinese and European standard gauge system. Further information: Eurasian Land Bridge

== See also ==
- Break-of-gauge
