= Kiel–Lübeck railway =

Railway line in Germany

Kiel–Lübeck
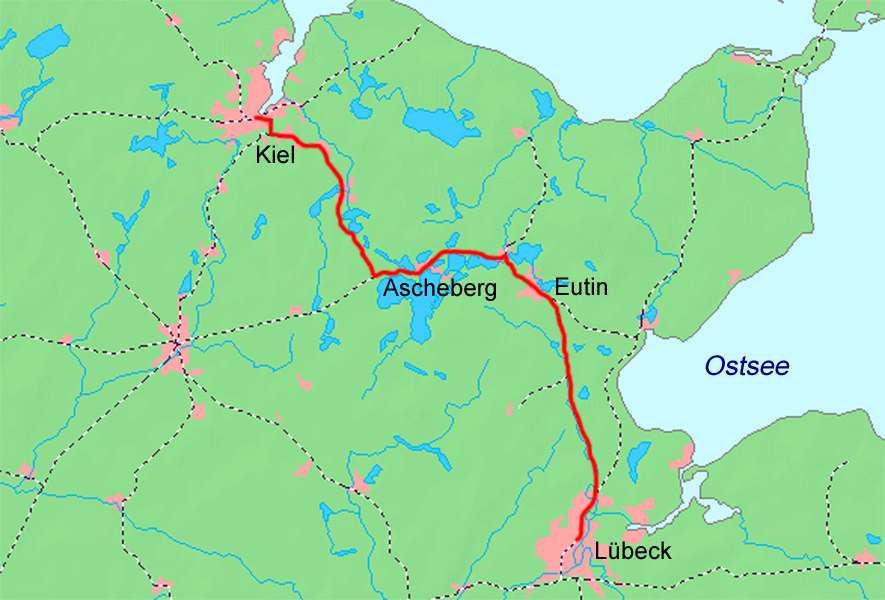

Overview
- Line number: 1023/1110/1100

Service
- Route number: 145, ex 114 e

Technical
- Line length: 80.7 km (50.1 mi) (Double-track railway: Kiel Hbf–Abzw. Kiel Hbf. (SS); Bad Malente-Gremsmühlen–Eutin; Bad Schwartau–Lübeck Hauptbahnhof)
- Track gauge: 1,435 mm (4 ft 8 1/2 in)

The Kiel–Lübeck railway is a non-electrified, mostly single-track railway line in eastern Schleswig-Holstein in north Germany. It links Kiel and Lübeck, the only two large cities (with more than 100,000 inhabitants) in the state. In 2010, passenger services on the 81-kilometre (50 mi) route were operated by DB Regio.

== Geography ==
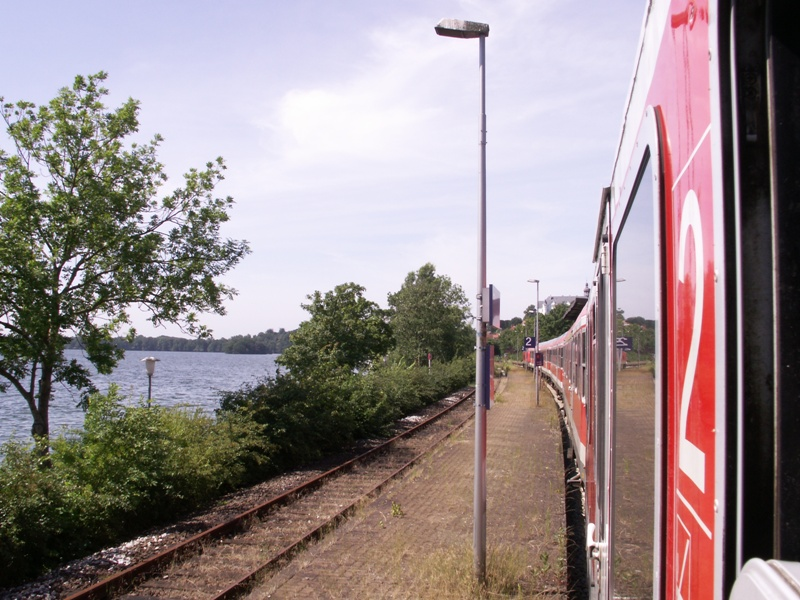
View of the Großer Plöner See immediately next to Plön station.

The route runs from Kiel via the towns of Preetz, Plön and Eutin to Lübeck through the Schleswig-Holstein Uplands and, on the Ascheberg–Eutin section, through Holstein Switzerland. This region is characterized by lakes, forests and terminal moraines and is thus an important recreational area.

== History ==
The Kiel–Ascheberg section was opened on 31 May 1866 together with the Neumünster–Neustadt in Holstein line (see Neumünster–Ascheberg and Eutin–Neustadt railways). The operator of both routes was the Altona-Kiel Railway Company (LFS). Thus Kiel and Neumünster were connected by rail with the Baltic port of Neustadt, but not yet with the important seaport of Lübeck. The reason for this was that, at that time, Lübeck, as a Free Imperial City, was not part of Schleswig-Holstein and the King of Denmark, who ruled it in personal union, did not wish to fund the industrial expansion of Lübeck.

It was not until 10 April 1873 that the railway from Eutin via Bad Schwartau to Lübeck was added. This line was built by the Eutin-Lübeck Railway Company (ELE). The AKE was nationalized in 1884, the profitable ELE not until 1941.

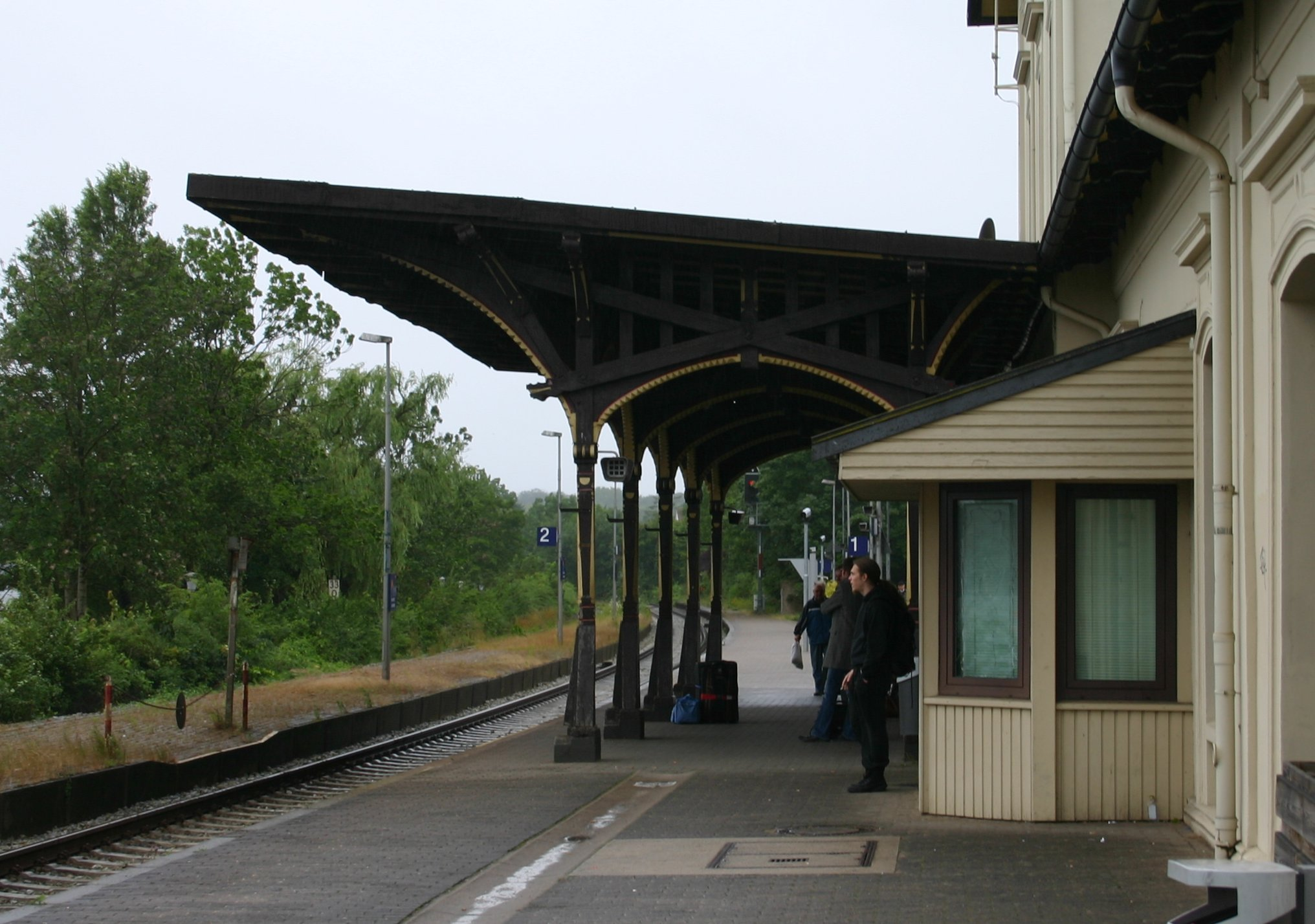
The roof of the Princes' Station in Plön today.

The platform canopy on the station in Plön today was built in 1890 at Holsteinische Schweiz station, then dismantled in 1896 and rebuilt at Plön's Princes' Station (officially: Plön-Park station). In 1910 it was moved again to Plön station.

Despite the different railway companies, passenger trains were soon working the Kiel-Lübeck route, while the other two branches - Neumünster–Ascheberg and Eutin–Neustadt - become less important. In 1929 there was a D-Zug express pair that ran between Kiel, Lübeck and Berlin. The D-Zug took about 95 minutes to work the Kiel-Lübeck line. Other through passenger trains required about 150 minutes. The Neumünster–Ascheberg line was then integrated into the timetable of the route.

Later, the line grew in importance. In the mid-1970s, the D-Zug pair known as the Black Forest Express (Schwarzwald-Express, Kiel-Seebrugg) and several Heckeneilzüge worked the line, including a pair of trains on the Kiel-Bad Harzburg route. The track was then designated as route number 145: Flensburg-Lüneburg. Several Eilzug semi-fast trains also ran through services between these two towns. Many of these trains were hauled by power cars of Class 613.

Between 1980 and 1985 several stations on the line were closed to passenger traffic. This affected Bockholt and Kühren in 1980, Elmschenhagen, Kroog (both districts of Kiel) and Wahlstorf in 1981 and Gleschendorf Ottendorf, Timmdorf and Pansdorf in 1985. The latter was reopened in 2000.

The first stage of construction of the expansion project on the Kiel-Lübeck route had been achieved by June 2010. It included the construction of the railway station in Kiel-Elmschenhagen with a crossing loop, the expansion of Plön station for system crossings (including an extensive renovation of the station building and platforms) and the expansion of the Preetz–Ascheberg section to handle speeds of up to 140 km/h (87 mph). The new measures are designed to enable something approximating to a half-hourly service between Kiel and Lübeck.

=== Current operations ===
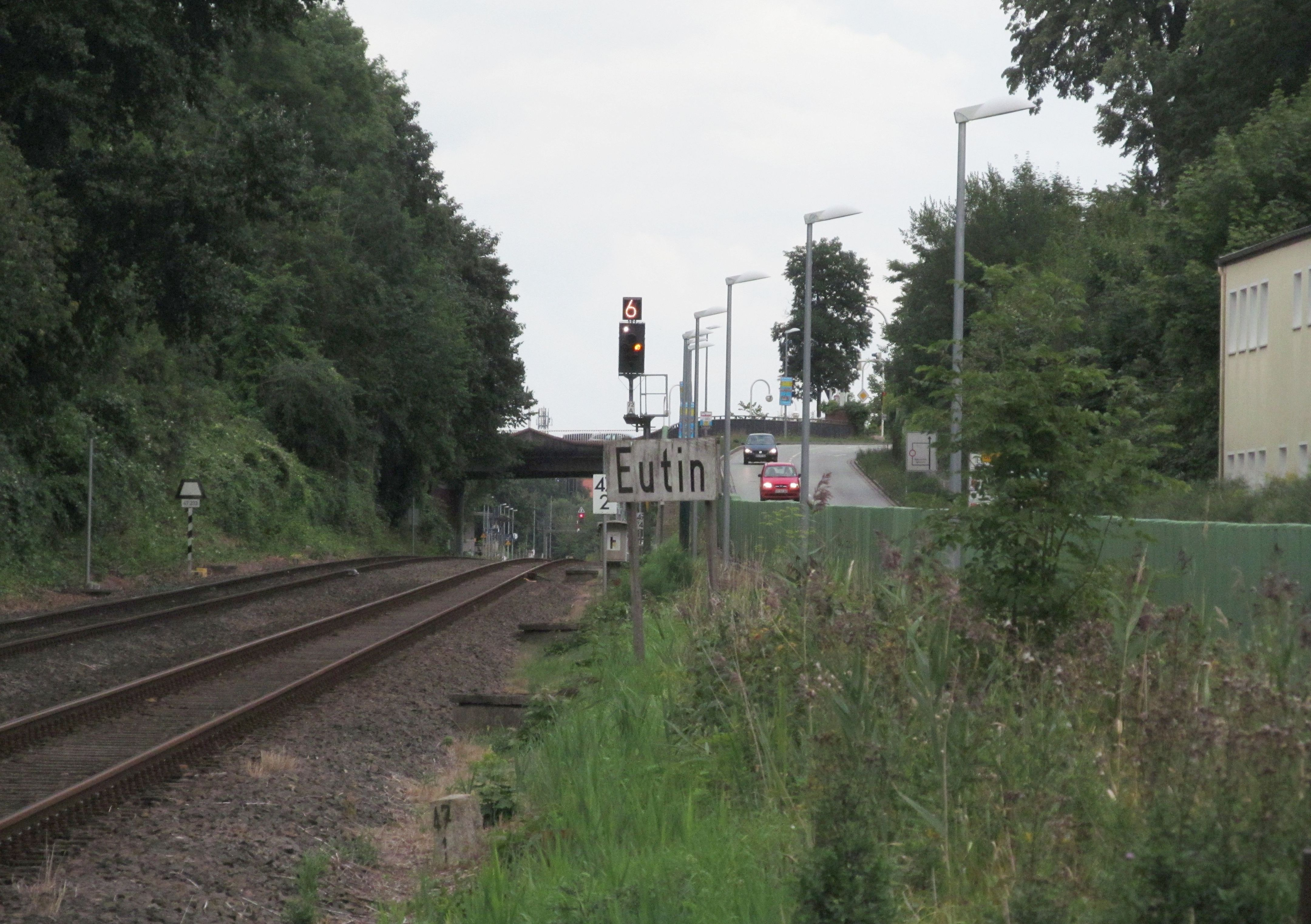
Approaching the Eutin station.

Today the line is worked by Regional-Express trains running every hour. The Class 648 multiple units used since 2009 are sometimes supplemented by locomotive-hauled trains in peak periods for reasons of capacity. These trains are usually headed by DB Class 218s and comprise five to seven modernised Silberlings and double-decker coaches. The average journey time between the two cities is 69 minutes.

In addition, since June 2010 Regionalbahn services using multiple units have also worked the entire route, so that there is approximately a half-hourly service. Since December 2009, new vehicles of type LINT 41 have been used.

There are no longer any regular goods trains.

=== Future ===
The 81-kilometre-long (50 mi) railway has (As of 2022) a travel time of 71 minutes, averaging 63 km/h (39 mph). As it goes between two cities of above 200,000 inhabitants each, there is large potential. There is a plan to shorten the time to below one hour. In 2024 the Kiel–Preetz section will be partly rerouted and upgraded to 140 km/h (87 mph).

=== Connections ===
The former through trains from Flensburg via Kiel to Lübeck – sometimes even as far as Lüneburg–Uelzen–Brunswick – are separated operationally in Kiel, resulting in the following services as of 2025:

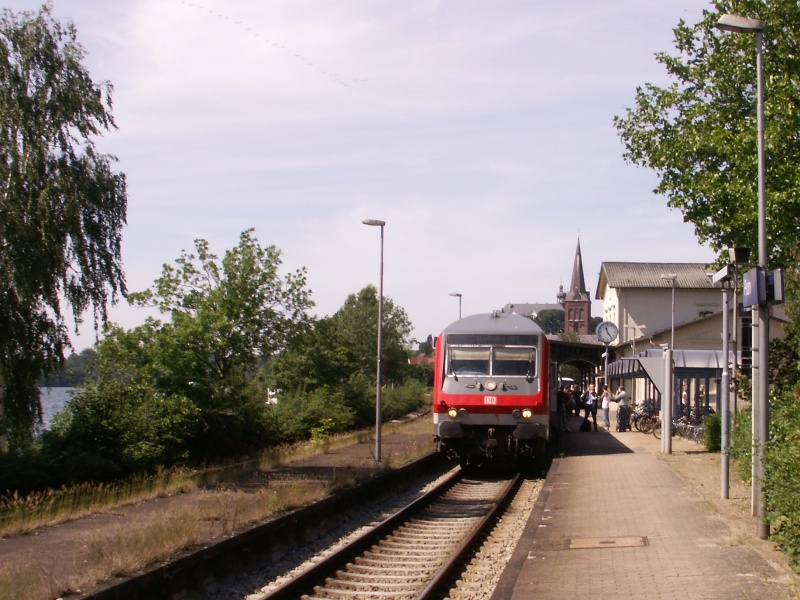
RE Kiel–Lübeck–Hamburg at Plön station

| Type | Service | Route |
|---|---|---|
| RE83 | Regional-Express | Kiel – Eutin – Lübeck – Lüneburg |
| RB84 | Regionalbahn | Kiel – Preetz – Eutin – Lübeck |
