= Malente-Gremsmühlen–Lütjenburg railway =

Railway line in Germany

Malente-Gremsmühlen–Lütjenburg
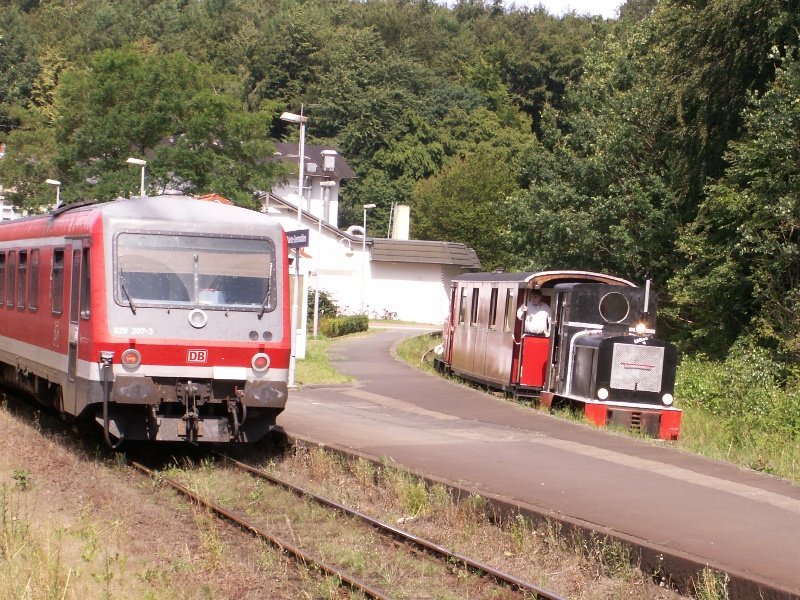
- Bad Malente-Gremsmühlen station: Standard gauge track meets narrow gauge track

Overview
- Line number: 1112

Service
- Route number: 147 (1976)

Technical
- Line length: 17.26 km (10.72 mi)
- Track gauge: 600 mm (1 ft 11 5/8 in)
- Old gauge: 1,435 mm (4 ft 8 1/2 in)

The Malente–Lütjenburg railway was a standard gauge, branch line in the north German state of Schleswig-Holstein. It was built by the businessman, Janus, who ran the Holsteinische Schweiz hotel, that gave its name to the local station on the line. It is currently closed.

The line was planned to use a 600 mm (1 ft 11 5/8 in) narrow gauge railway for tourist traffic prior to the railway's closure. The future of the railway is uncertain.

== Route ==
The route has a length of about 17 kilometres (11 mi) and links the resort of Bad Malente-Gremsmühlen with Lütjenburg in Holstein Switzerland (Holsteinischen Schweiz).

=== List of stations and halts ===
Its stations and halts are:

- Gremskamp (Flohmarkthalle) (former Malente-Güterbahnhof - goods station)
- 0.00 Bad Malente-Gremsmühlen; formerly a "wedge station" (Keilbahnhof) between the Kiel–Lübeck railway and this line; from 31 May 1866
- Malentino (Kleinbahn halt); since 5 December 2006
- Malente Markt (Kleinbahn halt); since 2007
- Malente-Neversfelde; since 19 July 2008
- 2.01 Malente-Nord (since 13 September 2008 Eggersdorf); from summer 1954
- 3.89 Holsteinische Schweiz; from 25 May 1890
- 5.49 Bruhnskoppel; from 1890
- 6.72 Malkwitz; from summer 1954
- 8.32 Benz; from 1890
- 9.60 Flehm; from summer 1955
- 11.15 Kletkamp; from 8 December 1890
- 13.00 Blekendorf; from summer 1954
- 15.20 Friederikenthal; from summer 1954
- Schmiedendorf; from 1 June 1891 to 14 October 1892
- 17.26 Lütjenburg

== History ==
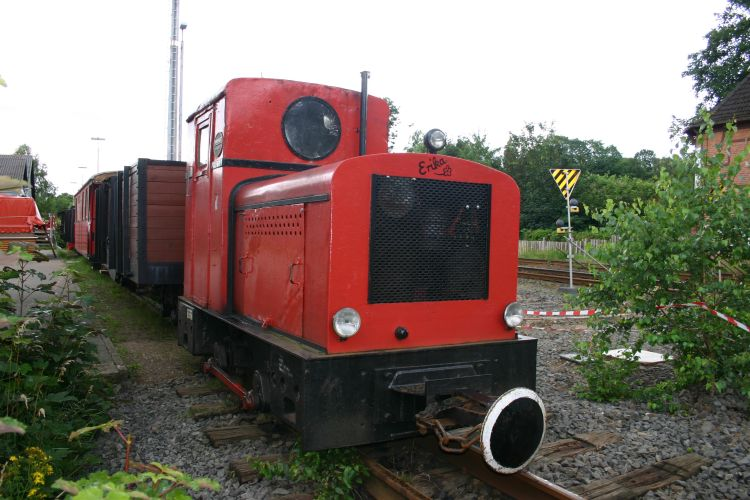
Erika, Deutz 16373, is one of the two diesel engines on the Kleinbahn

The contract for the construction of the line was signed on 15 May 1888. The railway was opened in several stages.

== Sources ==
- Hamelau, Olaf (2008). Hein Lüttenborg. Die Nebenbahn Malente-Gremsmühlen–Lütjenburg. Sutton-Verlag, Erfurt 2008, ISBN 978-3-86680-337-4
- Hamelau, Olaf (2010). Die Eisenbahn in Ostholstein. Sutton-Verlag, Erfurt 2010, ISBN 978-3-86680-589-7
