= Woltersteich =

Lake in Schleswig-Holstein, Germany

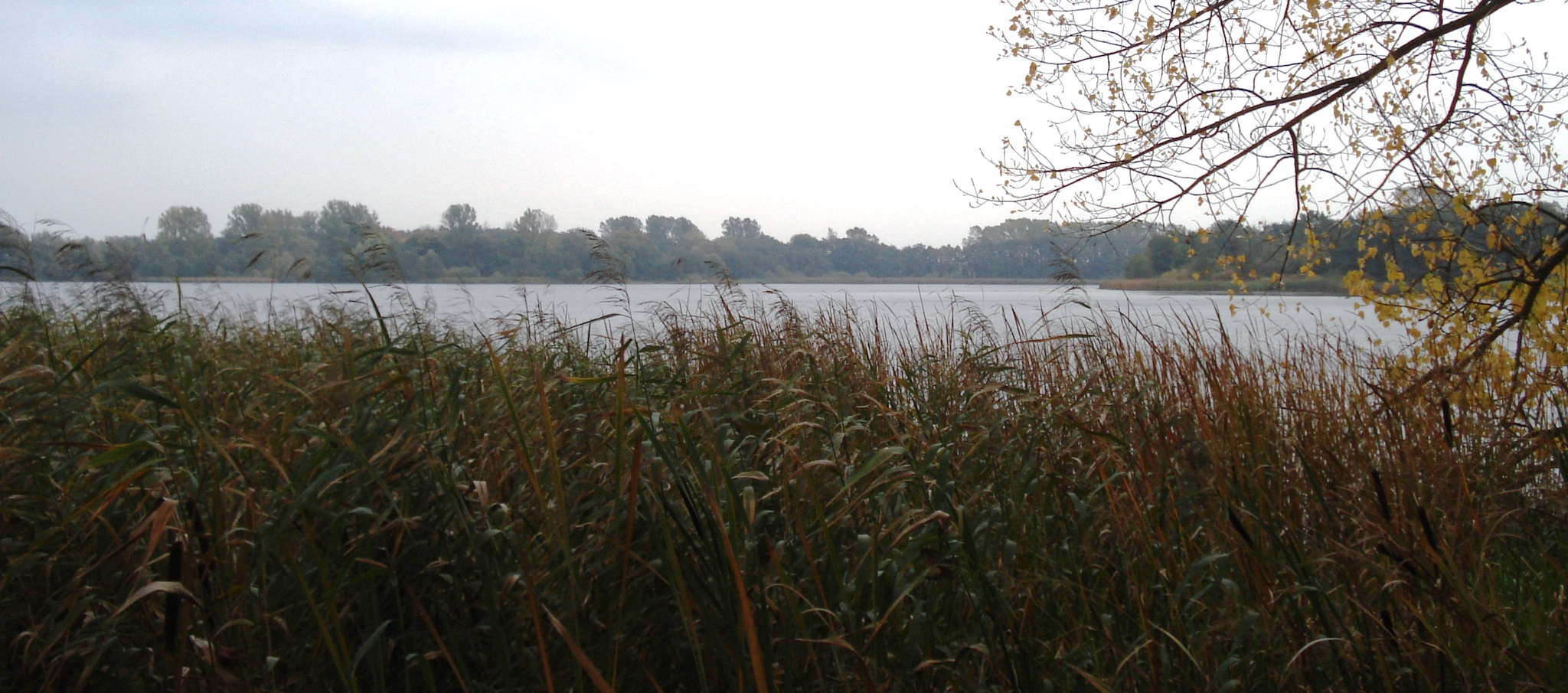

- Location within Schleswig-Holstein
- Location: Süsel, Holsteinische Schweiz, Schleswig-Holstein
- Coordinates: 54.06°N 10.675°E
- Basin countries: Germany
- Max. length: 0.6 km (0.37 mi)
- Max. width: 0.6 km (0.37 mi)
- Surface area: 0.36 km^{2} (0.14 sq mi)

Woltersteich is a lake in Süsel, Holsteinische Schweiz, Schleswig-Holstein, Germany. Its surface area is 0.36 km^{2}.
