= Barkauer See =

Lake in Süsel, Schleswig-Holstein, Germany

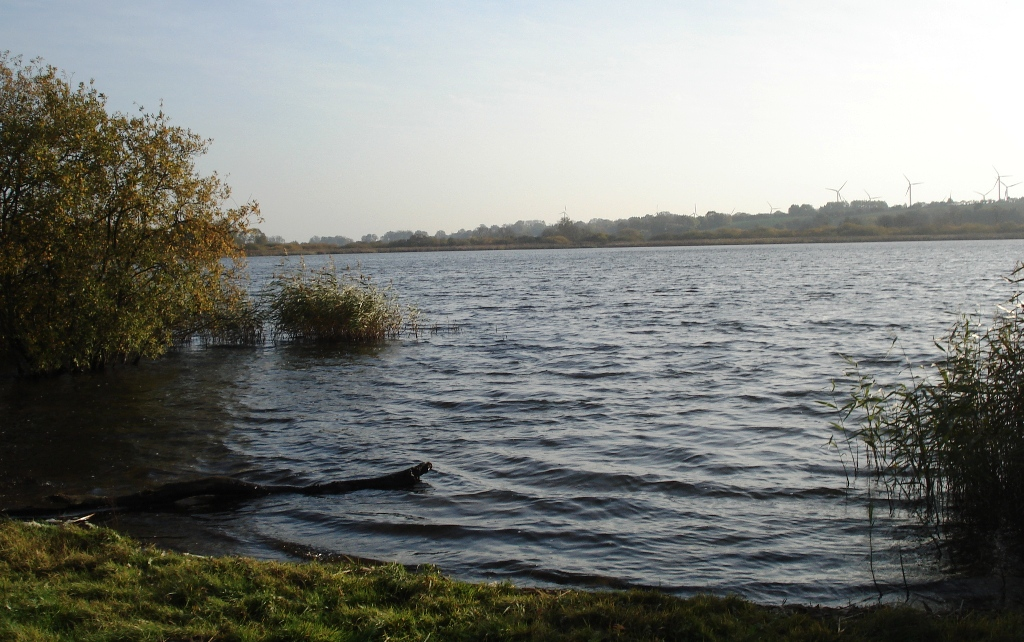

- Location within Schleswig-Holstein
- Location: Süsel, Kreis Ostholstein, Schleswig-Holstein
- Coordinates: 54.082052°N 10.642233°E
- Primary outflows: Schwartau
- Basin countries: Germany
- Max. length: 1 km (0.62 mi)
- Surface area: 5 km^{2} (1.9 sq mi)
- Max. depth: 1.6 m (5 ft 3 in)

Barkauer See is a lake in Süsel, Kreis Ostholstein, Schleswig-Holstein, Germany. Its surface area is 5km².
