= Neumünster–Ascheberg railway =

Railway line in Germany

Neumünster–Ascheberg (Holst) railway
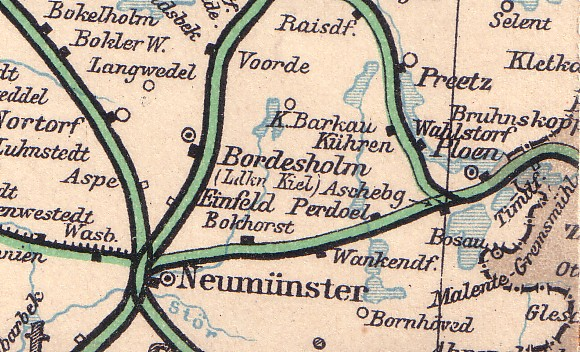
- Map of the Neumünster–Ascheberg line (about 1908)

Overview
- Line number: 1041
- Locale: Schleswig-Holstein

Service
- Route number: 148 (1985)

Technical
- Line length: 26 km (16 mi)
- Track gauge: 1,435 mm (4 ft 8 1/2 in) standard gauge

The Neumünster–Ascheberg railway runs from the mid Holstein city of Neumünster east to Ascheberg (Holstein) near Plön in the German state of Schleswig-Holstein. The 26 kilometre line is currently closed, although there is a campaign to reopen it.

== Geography ==
The line runs in the west through the flat, mostly agricultural landscape known as geest. In the east it reaches Holstein Switzerland, which is dominated by lakes and terminal moraines.

== History ==
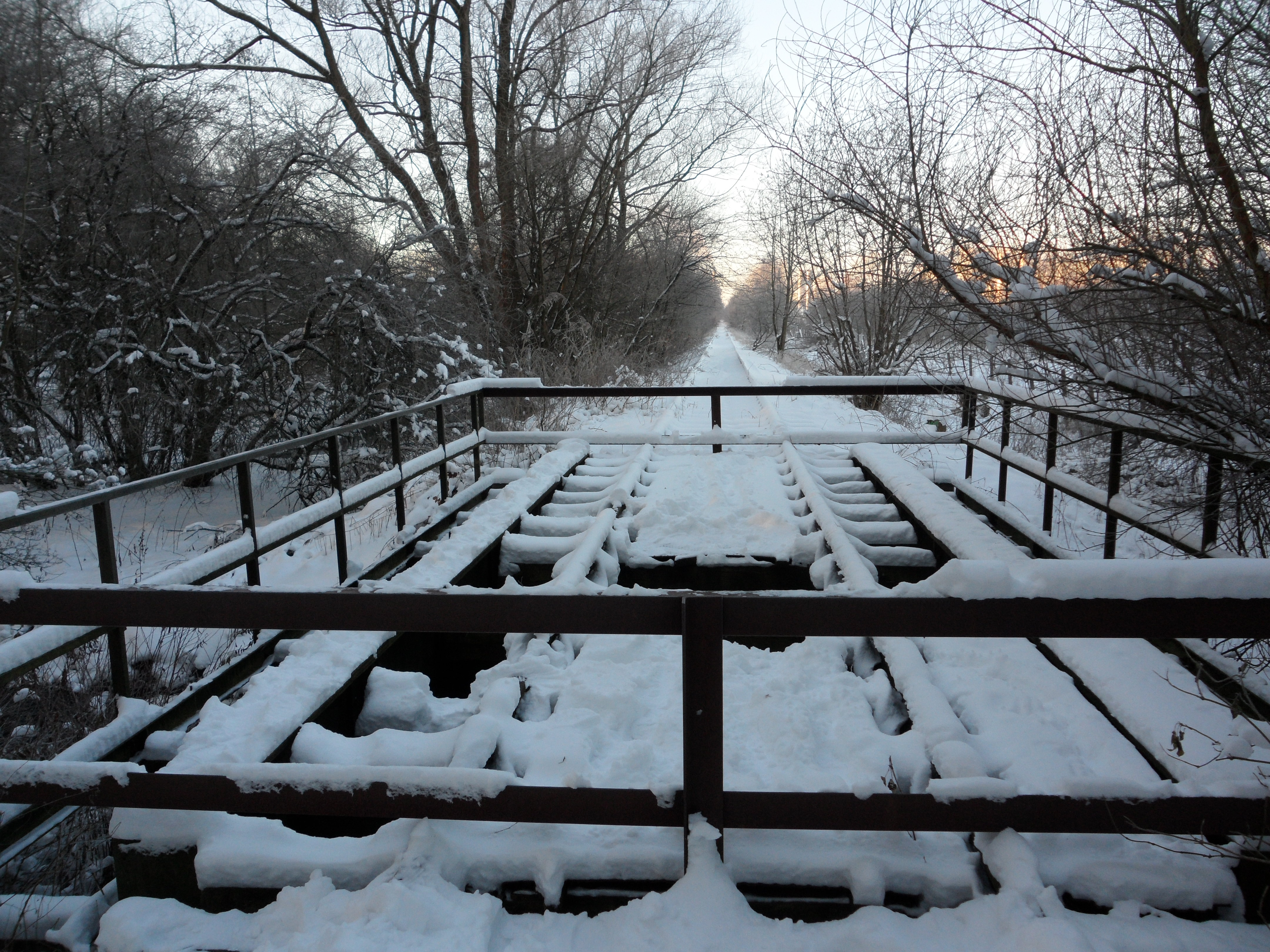
Closed bridge over the Dosenbek in Neumünster, looking towards the city (2010)

The Neumünster–Ascheberg–Eutin–Neustadt line was opened on 31 May 1866. The line was operated by the Altona-Kiel Railway Company (German: Altona-Kieler Eisenbahn-Gesellschaft, AKE), which was nationalised in 1884. In railway timetables, the line was soon shown in three sections. From Ascheberg (Holst) to Eutin it was considered part of the Kiel–Lübeck railway. The easternmost section from Eutin to Neustadt was now managed as a separate line (the Eutin–Neustadt railway).

From 1912 to 1961 the line was crossed on a bridge by the Kiel-Segeberg Light Railway (Kleinbahn Kiel–Segeberg) in Wankendorf. The lines were not connected.

The line was operated almost continuously with both passenger and freight traffic. The longest passenger services operated from the 1950s to the 1970s as a single daily pair of services between Büsum and Eutin and later between Heide and Neustadt. Both routes crossed almost the full width of Schleswig-Holstein. In the 1970s, these fast passenger trains were operated mostly with class 515 accumulator railcars. They stopped between Neumünster and Ascheberg (Holst) only in Wankendorf and recorded a travel time of 20 minutes on this section, while the local trains took about 28 minutes. These trains mostly ran as railcars, but some were locomotive-hauled. Some passenger trains were bound for places off the main route.

On 29 September 1985 passenger rail transport were abandoned between Neumünster and Ascheberg (Holst). Thus, to this time (2010), the line was the second last in Schleswig-Holstein to be closed for passengers (in 1988, passenger services on the Wilster-Brunsbüttel branch line of the Marsh Railway were closed). Freight traffic was abandoned on 1 November 1995. However, the route has not been closed, but was protected until 2007 under a Schleswig-Holstein-wide agreement. However, in 1996, a railway bridge near Ascheberg (Holst) station was demolished and the connecting points were altered. The connection from the tracks towards Neumünster have been partly built over. In October 2006, the barriers at the Christianstraße crossing in Neumünster have been dismantled and on both sides of the road a fence has been built over the tracks. The bridge over the Dosenbek river in the Brachenfelder Gehölz is blocked by a railing. Also the bridge close to Ascheberg (Holst) station has been demolished.

Draisine rides operate between Bokhorst and Wankendorf.

Bus line 360 of the Verkehrsbetriebe Kreis Plön runs from Plön to Neumünster, connecting the towns formerly served by the line.

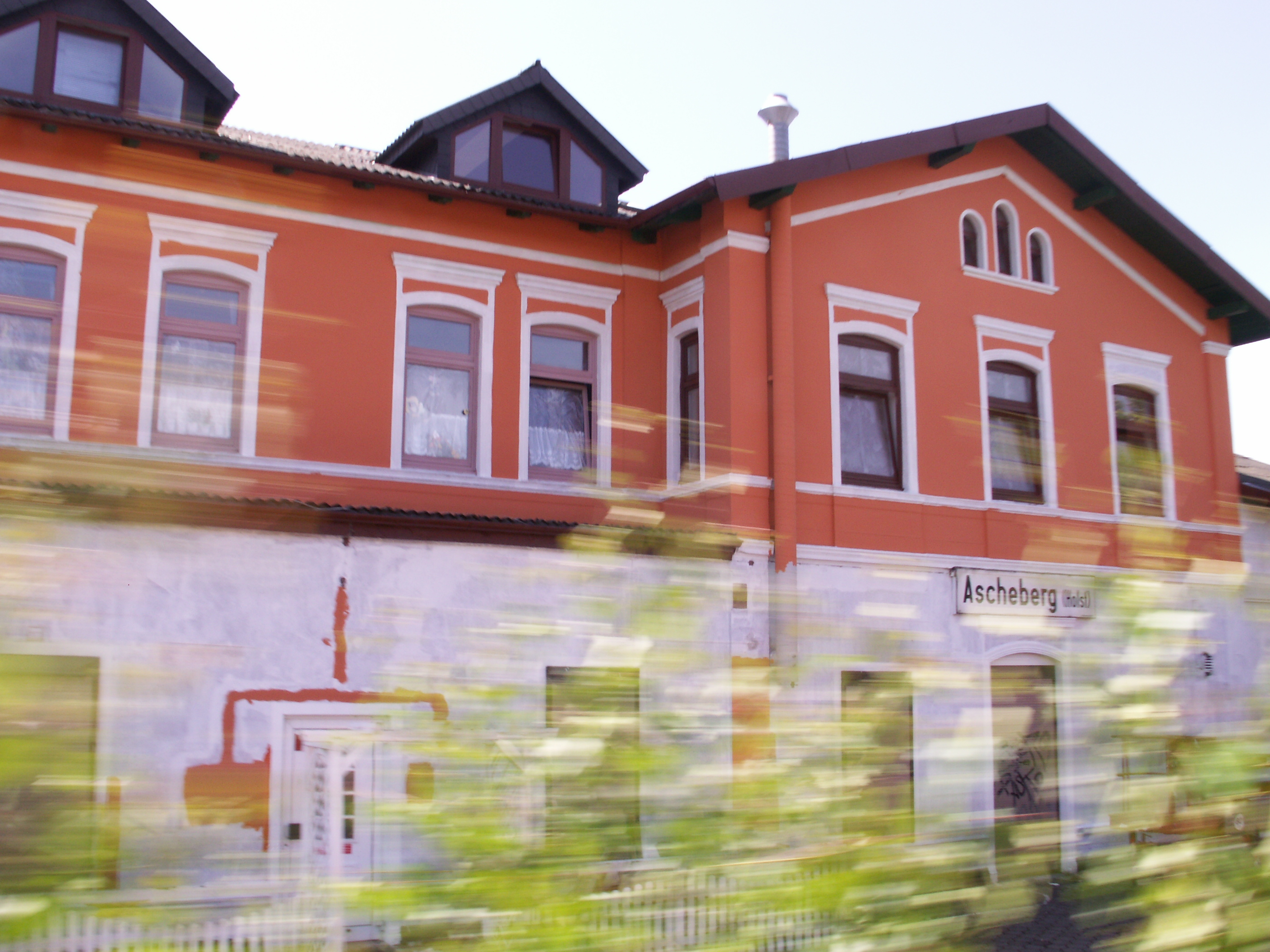
Ascheberg (Holst) station
