= Altona-Kiel Railway Company =

Railway company

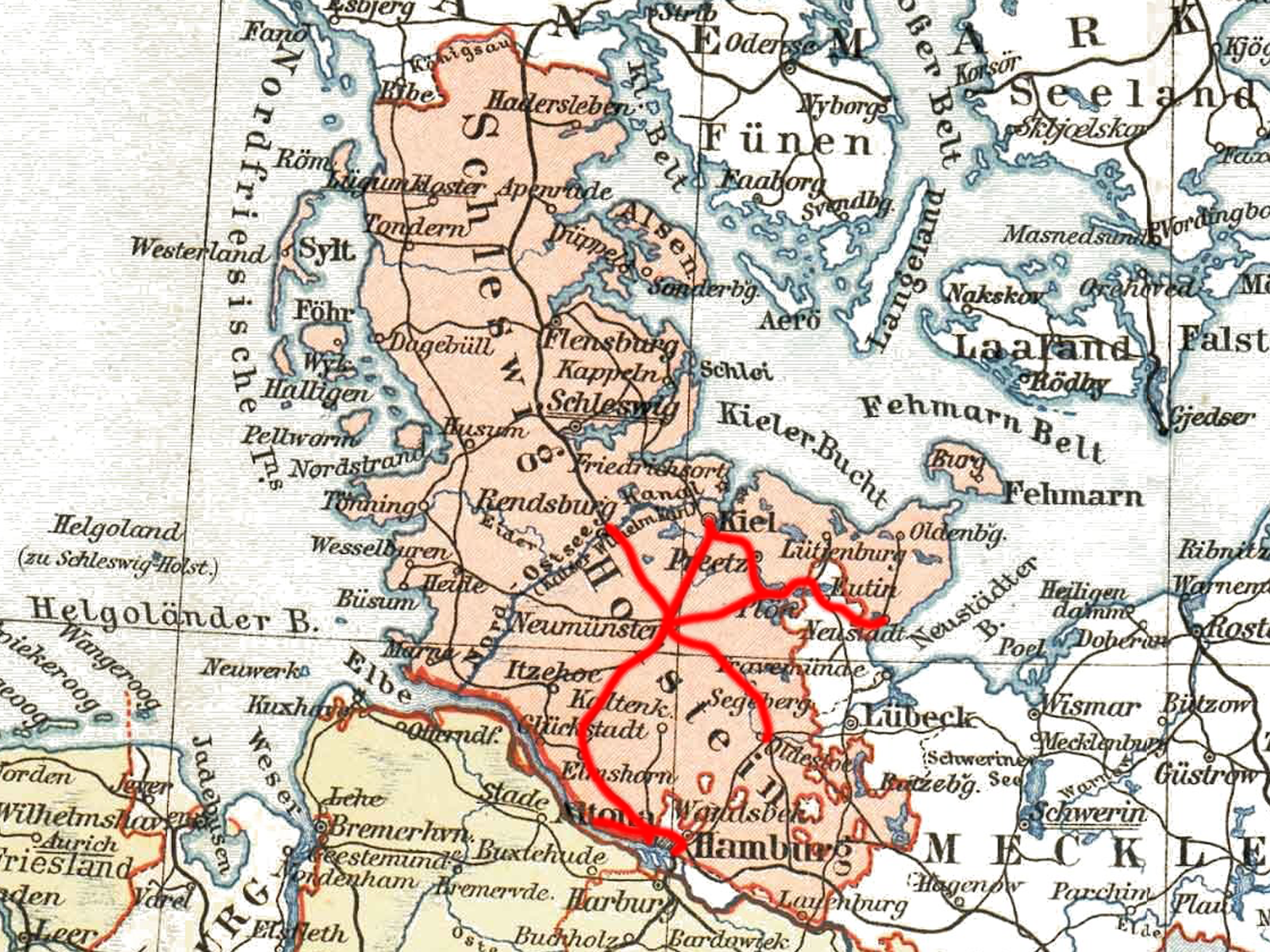
AKE network in 1884

The Altona-Kiel Railway Company (German: Altona-Kieler Eisenbahn-Gesellschaft, AKE) was a joint-stock company, established under the law of Denmark in personal union with the Duchy of Holstein, that built and operated an 105 km railway line between Altona and the Baltic Sea port city of Kiel. Altona was at that time the second largest city under Danish rule and the railway line was the first built in Danish-controlled territory.

== Formation ==
=== Background ===
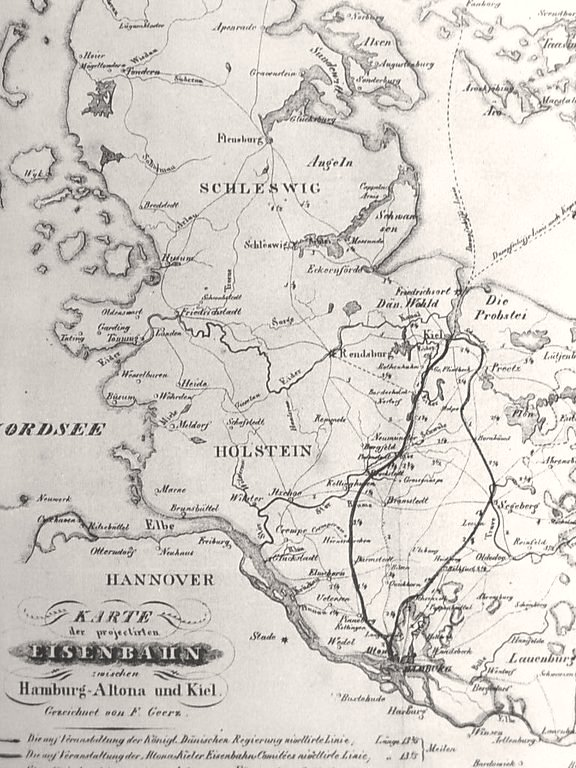
Route choice: via Segeberg or Neumünster

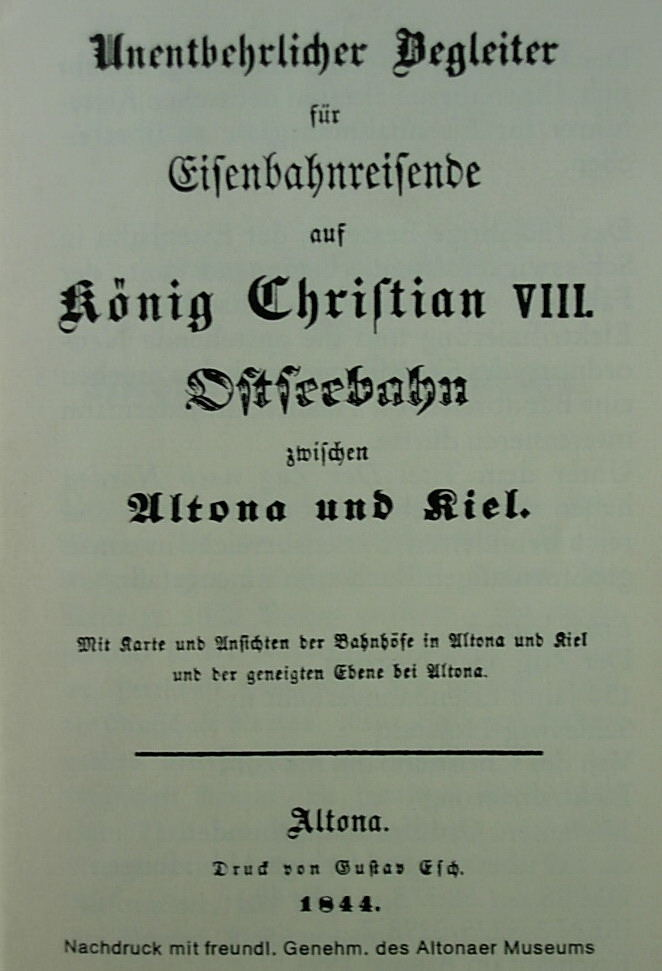
Cover of "Essential companion for travelers on the King Christian VIII Baltic Railway between Altona and Kiel", published 1844

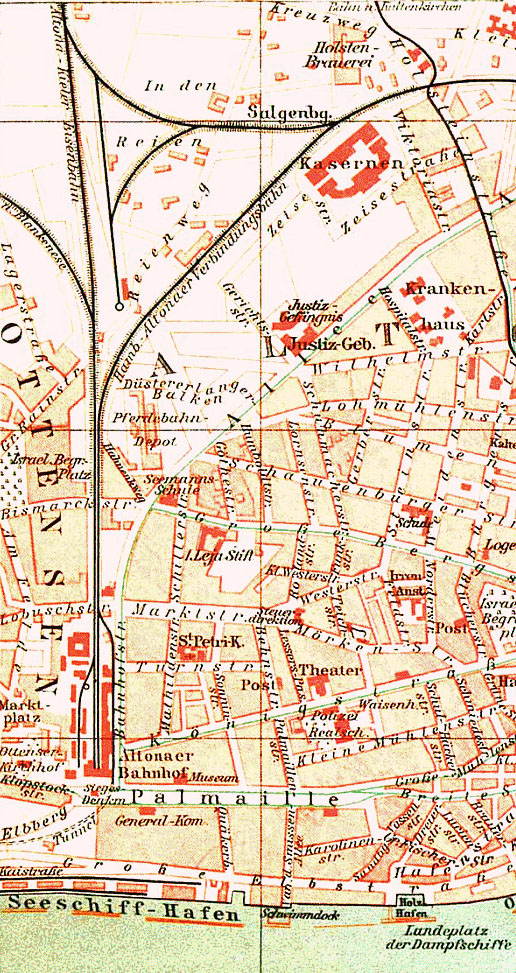
Map of Altona station with the link line in 1890

The company was founded in December 1840 on the initiative of merchants from Altona and Kiel. Among the initiators in Kiel were Georg Hanssen and Johann Christian Kruse. The participants sought to improve the transport of their goods to markets by connecting the North and Baltic Seas and they agreed to promote this objective as members of the Altona-Kiel railway committee.

In 1833, the economist Friedrich List had proposed a network of railways in Germany, including a rail link between the Hanseatic cities of Hamburg and Lübeck. In 1835, this proposal was rejected by the Royal Railway Commission, established by the King of Denmark, Frederick VI, as the heir to the throne, later Christian VIII, would only agree to a rail link between the Elbe and the Baltic Sea on Danish-only territory, for fiscal reasons.

=== Financing ===
Finance was raised as follows in 1844:

- 27.0%: Danish government
- 21.6%: Altona
- 19.2%: private investors
- 16.2 %: Kiel
- 13.1%: shares held by the Company
- 1.1 %: Neumünster
- 1.1%: Altona Support Institute
- 0.4 %: Elmshorn
- 0.3 %: Pinneberg

=== Route selection ===
The English engineer George W. Buck was commissioned to plan the route. He came to the conclusion that in order to avoid hills the line should not pass through Segeberg but should instead run via Barmstedt and Neumünster. As a result of the influence of Klaus Panje, Elmshorn offered to increase its shares in the enterprise if the line took a more westerly course, which a general meeting of the company agreed to in May 1842. Christian VIII issued the company a license for the line on 28 June 1842. The line’s termini would be built close to the respective ports. In the plan of 1844, other stations would be built in Pinneberg, Tornesch, Elmshorn, Wrist, Neumünster and Bordesholm; and there would be halts in Stellingen, Eidelstedt, Halstenbek, Priesdorf, Horst, Dauenhof, Siebenecksknöll, Brockstedt, Pahdenstedt, Fohrde and Meimersdorf.

=== Construction and opening ===
Construction of the 105 km long line started in March 1843, originally as single-track except in Kiel, Neumünster and Altona to let two trains in opposite directions pass. The chief engineer (in 1845 promoted to executive director of the company) was Edward Dietz, who had previously worked for the Leipzig–Dresden Railway Company. It was opened under the name of the Christian VIII Baltic Railway (German: Christian VIII. Ostseebahn, Danish: Christian VIII's Østersøbane) on 18 September 1844, the birthday of the king, with a ceremony in the train hall of the not yet completed Altona station and the first rail service to Kiel (travel time: three hours). This was the first railway line in the Danish state. It was originally equipped with ten locomotives, eight tenders, 37 carriages and 50 freight wagons. The speed limit was 45 km/h during the day and 30 km/h by darkness.

The rolling stock was ordered after an international tender. Five steam locomotives with an 1A1 wheel arrangement were built by the companies of Kitson, Thompson & Hewitson of Leeds and R and W Hawthorn of Newcastle. Tenders were built by Wöhlert in Berlin. Carriages were supplied by Röhe & Wienbarg of Altona. Parcel and freight wagons were supplied by Meyer of Uetersen, Knupper of Altona and Schweffel & Howaldt of Kiel.

== Schedule and time ==
The end points of the lines in Altona and Kiel were found have a time difference in exact astronomical time of about 40 seconds due to their location. Depending on what time was adopted a train between Altona and Kiel could be considered to have arrived nearly a minute too early or too late, even if it was really on time. To address this problem, the railway, in collaboration with the Altona Observatory and its director Heinrich Christian Schumacher, developed an artificial medium time for its timetable, reducing the maximum variation from true geographic time to 20 seconds, which was considerably less noticeable.

This issue appeared with all railways as travel distances and speeds increased, finally leading to the convening of the International Meridian Conference in October 1884 in Washington, D. C., which agreed to adopt a universal day for astronomical purposes, eventually leading to the world being split into time zones, independent of precise astronomical time, including Germany’s adoption of Central European Time in 1893.

== Expansion of the railway network ==
Immediately after the completion of the main line, the construction started on a link between the low-lying banks of the Elbe and Altona station, which passed through the Altona Harbour Tunnel, known as the Schellfischtunnel (Haddock Tunnel). This line, which was opened in 1845, involved the haulage of wagons by cable up a 210-metre-long steep slope to overcome a height difference of 30 metres. The port railway in Kiel was opened to traffic on 1 September 1844.

Also in 1845, the company expanded its network as it took over management of operations of the 34 km-long line of the Rendsburg-Neumünster Railway Company (Rendsburg-Neumünstersche Eisenbahn). While trying to purchase the lines of the English railway entrepreneur, Sir Samuel Morton Peto (the Flensburg–Husum–Tönning Railway Company), the AKE managed to purchase from him the valuable Rendsburg–Neumünster line on 1 January 1864. After that, Peto progressively reduced his business in Schleswig-Holstein and the AKE became its most important railway company.

The company, together with the government of Hamburg, built the Hamburg-Altona link line and the former Klosterthor station, connecting the AKE’s line to the Berlin–Hamburg line near the former Berlin station and to the Lübeck-Büchen Railway’s Lübeck–Hamburg line near the former Lübeck station. Freight trains ran over the line from 30 September 1865 and passenger trains ran over it from 16 July 1866.

On 31 May 1866, the almost 90 km-long Neumünster–Ascheberg–Eutin–Neustadt line (see Neumünster–Ascheberg, Kiel–Lübeck and Eutin–Neustadt railways) was opened in east Holstein, including a local port railway and the connection from Ascheberg to Kiel via Preetz. On 10 December 1875, the 45 km-long Neumünster–Segeberg–Oldesloe line was added.

The Altona–Blankenese line was opened on 19 May 1867 and its 18 km-long extension to Wedel on 2 December 1883. In 1907, this line became part of the Hamburg-Altona City and Suburban Railway and in 1934, part of the Hamburg S-Bahn.

=== Share holdings ===
On 31 December 1862, the AKE took over operations of the Elmshorn–Glückstadt line, opened on 20 July 1845, from the Glückstadt-Elmshorn Railway Company (Glückstadt-Elmshorner Eisenbahn-Gesellschaft), founded in 1844. On 15 October 1857, the line had been extended to Itzehoe.

From 1870 to 1884 the AKE managed the operations of the Schleswig Railway Company, which it did not own.

The AKE was also significantly involved in the Oldenburg District Railways. It managed the operations, from the opening of the first line from Neustadt in Holstein to Oldenburg on 30 September 1881.

The AKE also owned shares in the West Holstein Railway Company (Westholsteinische Eisenbahn-Gesellschaft) and later acquired the Wesselburen–Heide Railway Company (Wesselburen-Heider Eisenbahn-Gesellschaft).

== Nationalisation ==
As a result of the Second Schleswig War, Holstein became part of Prussia in 1867. In 1883 the Prussian government began to negotiate for the purchase of the Altona-Kiel Railway. Prussia took over administration and management on 1 March 1884 as the Royal Altona railway division (Königliche Eisenbahndirektion Altona), which moved into temporary premises in Altona. The company was purchase for 70.65 million marks by the Prussian State Railways on 1 January 1887 and the corporation was dissolved. Today the Hamburg-Altona-Kiel line is owned by Deutsche Bahn AG.
