= Project Unigauge =

Ongoing nationwide standardisation of railway track gauge in India

Comparison of different gauges in India with standard gauge

Project Unigauge, started on 1 April 1992, is an ongoing effort by Indian Railways to convert and unify almost all rail gauges in India to 1,676 mm (5 ft 6 in) broad gauge.

== Progress ==
| Year | Gauge | | | | | | |
| Year | Broad gauge (BG) (1,676 mm (5 ft 6 in)) | | Metre gauge (MG) (1,000 mm (3 ft 3 3/8 in)) | | Narrow gauges (NG) (762 mm (2 ft 6 in) and 610 mm (2 ft)) | | All gauges |
| Year | Route km | Route share | Route km | Route share | Route km | Route share | Route km |
|---|---|---|---|---|---|---|---|
| 1947 | 25,170 | 46.14% | 24,153 | 44.28% | 5,225 | 9.58% | 54,548 |
| 1971 (Mar) | 29,449 | 49.25% | 25,865 | 43.26% | 4,476 | 7.49% | 59,790 |
| 1972 (Mar) | 30,041 | 50.01% | 25,550 | 42.54% | 4,476 | 7.45% | 60,067 |
| 1973 (Mar) | 30,126 | 50.09% | 25,547 | 42.47% | 4,476 | 7.44% | 60,149 |
| 1974 (Mar) | 30,210 | 50.15% | 25,548 | 42.41% | 4,476 | 7.43% | 60,234 |
| 1975 (Mar) | 30,274 | 50.20% | 25,551 | 42.37% | 4,476 | 7.42% | 60,301 |
| 1976 (Mar) | 30,497 | 50.65% | 25,427 | 42.23% | 4,292 | 7.13% | 60,216 |
| 1977 (Mar) | 30,873 | 50.89% | 25,512 | 42.05% | 4,281 | 7.06% | 60,666 |
| 1978 (Mar) | 30,909 | 50.93% | 25,503 | 42.02% | 4,281 | 7.05% | 60,693 |
| 1979 (Mar) | 31,130 | 51.22% | 25,366 | 41.74% | 4,281 | 7.04% | 60,777 |
| 1980 (Mar) | 31,228 | 51.25% | 25,424 | 41.72% | 4,281 | 7.03% | 60,933 |
| 1981 (Mar) | 31,827 | 51.97% | 25,167 | 41.10% | 4,246 | 6.93% | 61,240 |
| 1982 (Mar) | 32,290 | 52.74% | 24,694 | 40.33% | 4,246 | 6.93% | 61,230 |
| 1983 (Mar) | 32,624 | 53.15% | 24,515 | 39.94% | 4,246 | 6.92% | 61,385 |
| 1984 (Mar) | 32,700 | 53.21% | 24,514 | 39.89% | 4,246 | 6.91% | 61,460 |
| 1985 (Mar) | 33,553 | 54.25% | 24,051 | 38.89% | 4,246 | 6.86% | 61,850 |
| 1986 (Mar) | 33,669 | 54.45% | 23,921 | 38.68% | 4,246 | 6.87% | 61,836 |
| 1987 (Mar) | 33,665 | 54.46% | 23,901 | 38.67% | 4,247 | 6.87% | 61,813 |
| 1988 (Mar) | 33,832 | 54.59% | 23,898 | 38.56% | 4,246 | 6.85% | 61,976 |
| 1989 (Mar) | 34,108 | 55.03% | 23,631 | 38.12% | 4,246 | 6.85% | 61,985 |
| 1990 (Mar) | 34,544 | 55.53% | 23,599 | 37.93% | 4,068 | 6.54% | 62,211 |
| 1991 (Mar) | 34,880 | 55.93% | 23,419 | 37.55% | 4,068 | 6.52% | 62,367 |
| 1992 (Mar) | 35,109 | 56.21% | 23,283 | 37.28% | 4,066 | 6.51% | 62,458 |
| 1993 (Mar) | 36,504 | 58.42% | 21,997 | 35.20% | 3,985 | 6.38% | 62,486 |
| 1994 (Mar) | 37,824 | 60.56% | 20,653 | 33.06% | 3,985 | 6.38% | 62,462 |
| 1995 (Mar) | 39,612 | 63.22% | 19,210 | 30.66% | 3,838 | 6.13% | 62,660 |
| 1996 (Mar) | 40,620 | 64.56% | 18,501 | 29.41% | 3,794 | 6.03% | 62,915 |
| 1997 (Mar) | 41,971 | 66.91% | 17,044 | 27.17% | 3,710 | 5.91% | 62,725 |
| 1998 (Mar) | 43,083 | 68.94% | 15,804 | 25.29% | 3,608 | 5.77% | 62,495 |
| 1999 (Mar) | 44,216 | 70.40% | 15,178 | 24.17% | 3,415 | 5.44% | 62,809 |
| 2000 (Mar) | 44,383 | 70.72% | 15,013 | 23.92% | 3,363 | 5.36% | 62,759 |
| 2001 (Mar) | 44,776 | 71.04% | 14,987 | 23.78% | 3,265 | 5.18% | 63,028 |
| 2002 (Mar) | 45,099 | 71.43% | 14,776 | 23.40% | 3,265 | 5.17% | 63,140 |
| 2003 (Mar) | 45,622 | 72.28% | 14,364 | 22.76% | 3,136 | 4.97% | 63,122 |
| 2004 (Mar) | 46,807 | 74.04% | 13,290 | 21.02% | 3,124 | 4.94% | 63,221 |
| 2005 (Mar) | 47,749 | 75.24% | 12,662 | 19.95% | 2,924 | 4.81% | 63,465 |
| 2006 (Mar) | 48,574 | 76.70% | 11,834 | 18.69% | 2,924 | 4.62% | 63,332 |
| 2007 (Mar) | 49,820 | 78.67% | 10,621 | 16.77% | 2,886 | 4.56% | 63,327 |
| 2008 (Mar) | 51,082 | 80.73% | 9,442 | 14.92% | 2,749 | 4.34% | 63,273 |
| 2009 (Mar) | 52,808 | 82.49% | 8,473 | 13.24% | 2,734 | 4.27% | 64,015 |
| 2010 (Mar) | 54,257 | 84.81% | 7,180 | 11.22% | 2,537 | 3.97% | 63,974 |
| 2011 (Mar) | 55,188 | 85.62% | 6,809 | 10.56% | 2,463 | 3.82% | 64,460 |
| 2012 (Mar) | 55,956 | 86.62% | 6,347 | 9.83% | 2,297 | 3.56% | 64,600 |
| 2013 (Mar) | 57,140 | 87.32% | 5,999 | 9.17% | 2,297 | 3.51% | 65,436 |
| 2014 (Mar) | 58,177 | 88.40% | 5,334 | 8.11% | 2,297 | 3.49% | 65,808 |
| 2015 (Mar) | 58,825 | 89.09% | 4,908 | 7.43% | 2,297 | 3.48% | 66,030 |
| 2016 (Mar) | 60,510 | 90.74% | 3,880 | 5.82% | 2,297 | 3.44% | 66,687 |
| 2017 (Mar) | 61,680 | 91.56% | 3,479 | 5.16% | 2,209 | 3.28% | 67,368 |
| 2018 (Mar) | 62,049 | 92.70% | 3,201 | 4.78% | 1,685 | 2.52% | 66,935 |
| 2019 (Mar) | 62,891 | 93.29% | 2,839 | 4.21% | 1,685 | 2.50% | 67,415 |
| 2020 (Mar) | 63,950 | 94.10% | 2,402 | 3.54% | 1,604 | 2.36% | 67,956 |
| 2021 (Mar) | 64,403 | 94.57% | 2,112 | 3.10% | 1,588 | 2.33% | 68,103 |
| 2022 (Mar) | 65,093 | 95.67% | 1,655 | 2.43% | 1,294 | 1.90% | 68,043 |
| 2023 (Mar) | 65,977 | 96.20% | 1,345 | 1.96% | 1,262 | 1.84% | 68,584 |
| 2024 (Mar) | 66,820 | 96.59% | 1,159 | 1.68% | 1,202 | 1.74% | 69,181 |
| 2025 (Mar) | 67,372 | 97.02% | 894 | 1.29% | 1,173 | 1.69% | 69,439 |

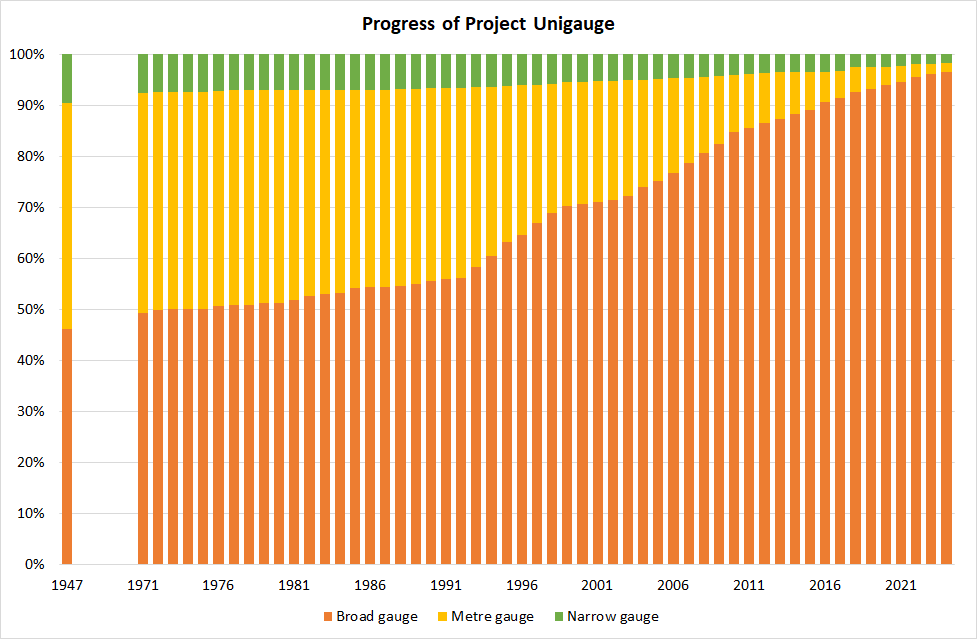

== Heritage railway lines excluded from conversion ==
These lines have their original gauge preserved as these are identified as heritage railways. Some of these are also among the UNESCO World Heritage Sites in India.

1. Nilgiri Mountain Railway 46 kilometres (29 mi) (Metre gauge – 1000 mm)
2. Patalpani–Kalakund section 15 kilometres (9.3 mi) (Metre gauge – 1000 mm)
3. Mailani Junction–Nanpara section 171 kilometres (106 mi) (Metre gauge – 1000 mm)
4. Kalka–Shimla Railway 96.6 kilometres (60.0 mi) (Narrow gauge – 762 mm)
5. Kangra Valley Railway 164 kilometres (102 mi) (Narrow gauge – 762 mm)
6. Bilimora–Waghai section 63 kilometres (39 mi) (Narrow gauge – 762 mm)
7. Darjeeling Himalayan Railway 88 kilometres (55 mi) (Narrow gauge – 610 mm)
8. Matheran Hill Railway 21 kilometres (13 mi) (Narrow gauge – 610 mm)

== See also ==
- Future of rail transport in India
- List of gauge conversions
