= Holsteinische Schweiz station =

Railway station in Malente, Germany

Coordinates: 54°11′10.3524″N 10°35′26.49″E

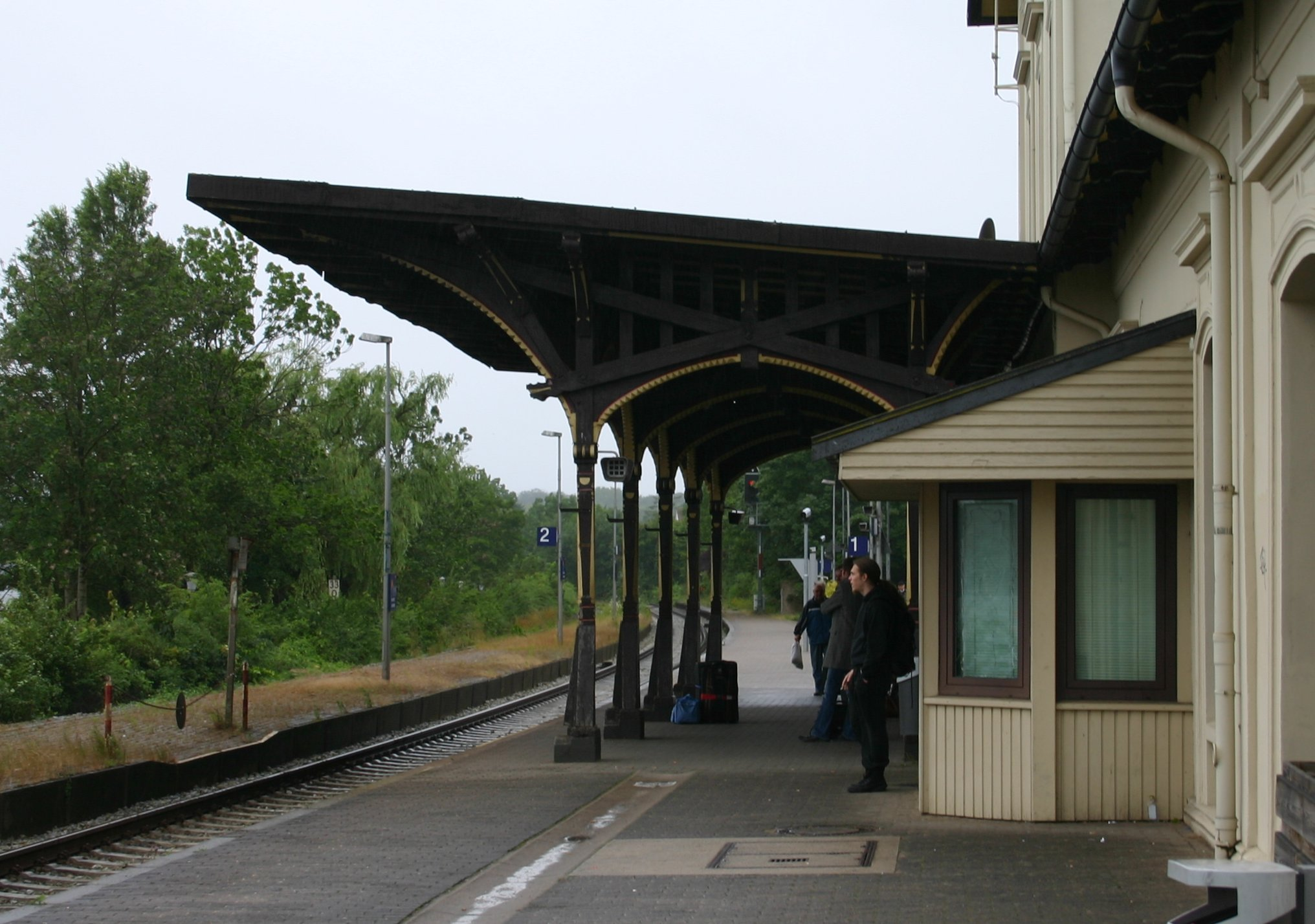
The old station platform roof, now at Plön station

Holsteinische Schweiz station (German: Bahnhof Holsteinische Schweiz) is a railway station by the Kellersee lake on the Malente-Gremsmühlen–Lütjenburg railway in Schleswig-Holstein. It was opened on 25 May 1890. The entire route was built due to the efforts of businessman Johannes Janus, who ran the Hotel Holsteinische Schweiz ("Holstein Switzerland") after which the station was named.

Platform 1 had a roof which was dismantled again in 1896 in order to be re-erected at Plön's prince's station (strictly Plön-Parkstation). Since 1910 this roof has graced the home platform at Plön station.

Regular passenger and goods services on the Malente-Gremsmühlen-Lütjenburg line, and therefore at Holsteinische Schweiz station were closed in 2000. Currently part of the line has been converted to 600 mm gauge and is back in service as a heritage railway. From Easter 2009 regular services have returned to Holsteinische Schweiz station. The station is serviced by the 600 mm narrow-gauge line called the Hein Schüttelborg.
