= Süsel =

- Municipality
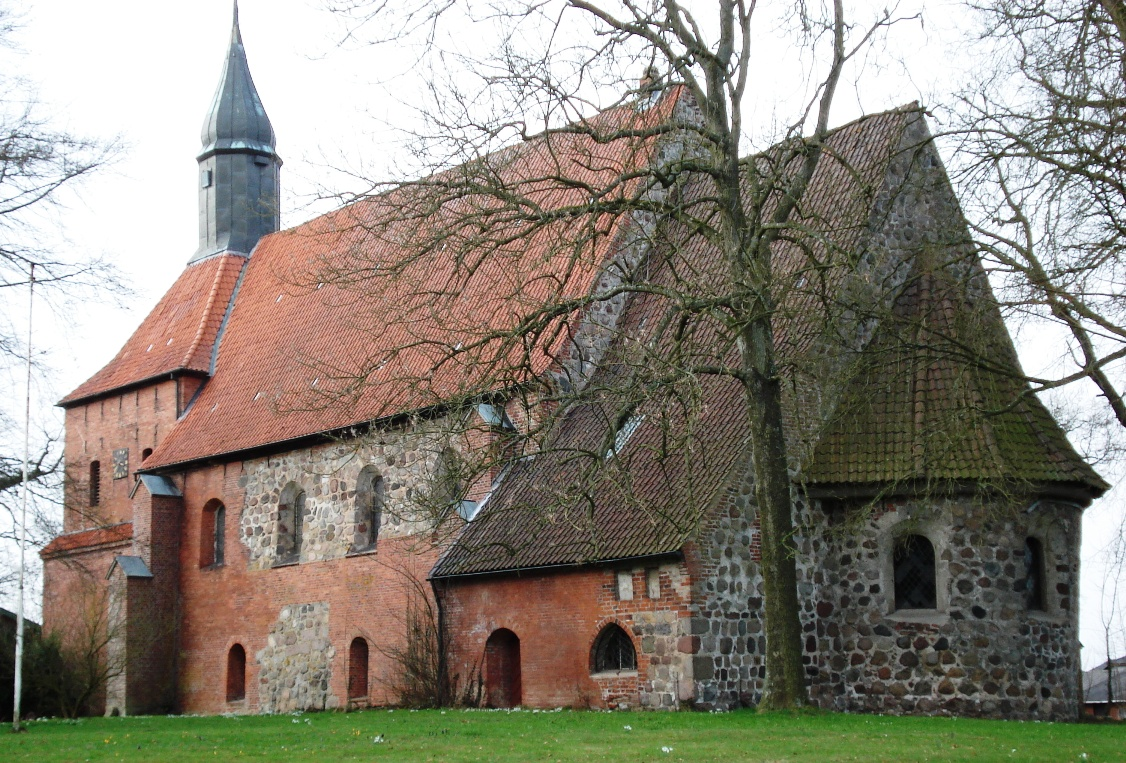
- Medieval church in Süsel

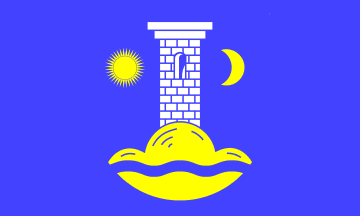
- Flag Coat of arms

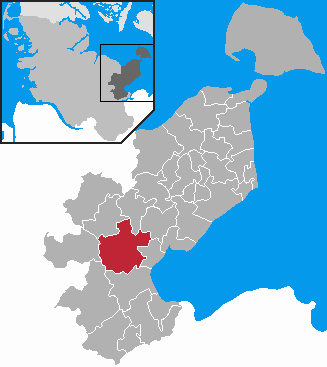
- Location of Süsel within Ostholstein district
- Interactive map of Süsel
- Location within Germany Location within Schleswig-Holstein
- Coordinates: 54°04′40″N 10°43′05″E
- Country: Germany
- State: Schleswig-Holstein
- District: Ostholstein
- Subdivisions: 15

Government
  - Mayor: Adrianus Boonekamp (CDU)

Area
  - Total: 75.31 km^{2} (29.08 sq mi)
- Elevation: 40 m (130 ft)

Population (2025-12-31)
  - Total: 4,971
  - Density: 66.01/km^{2} (171.0/sq mi)
- Time zone: UTC+01:00 (CET)
  - Summer (DST): UTC+02:00 (CEST)
- Postal codes: 23701
- Dialling codes: 04524, 04521, 04529
- Vehicle registration: OH
- Website: www.suesel.de

Süsel is a municipality in the district of Ostholstein, in Schleswig-Holstein, Germany. It is situated approximately 23 km north of Lübeck, and 10 km southeast of Eutin. The small lakes Barkauer See and Woltersteich are located here.
